= Bodegraven-Reeuwijk =

- Municipality
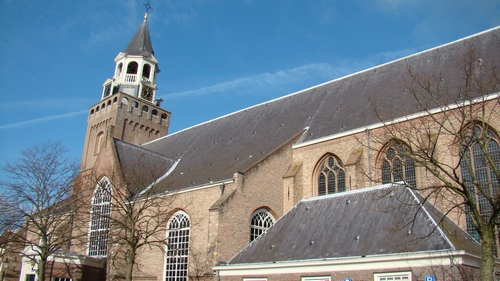
- Church in Bodegraven

- Flag Coat of arms

- Location in South Holland
- Coordinates: 52°5′N 4°45′E
- Country: Netherlands
- Province: South Holland
- Established: 1 January 2011

Government
  - Body: Municipal council
  - Mayor: Michiel Grauss (Christian Union)

Area
  - Total: 88.64 km^{2} (34.22 sq mi)
  - Land: 75.38 km^{2} (29.10 sq mi)
  - Water: 13.26 km^{2} (5.12 sq mi)
- Elevation: 0 m (0 ft)

Population (January 2021)
  - Total: 35,278
  - Density: 468/km^{2} (1,210/sq mi)
- Time zone: UTC+1 (CET)
  - Summer (DST): UTC+2 (CEST)
- Postcode: 2410–2415, 2810–2811, 3465–3466
- Area code: 0182, 0348
- Website: www.bodegraven-reeuwijk.nl

Bodegraven-Reeuwijk (Dutch pronunciation: [ˈboːdəɣraːvə(n) ˈreːuʋɛik]) is a municipality in the western Netherlands, in the province of South Holland with a population of 35,278 in 2021. It was established by a merger of Bodegraven and Reeuwijk on 1 January 2011. The municipality covers 88.64 km^{2} (34.22 sq mi) of which 13.26 km^{2} (5.12 sq mi) is water.

== Population centres ==
The new merger also includes the historic municipalities of Waarder, Middelburg, Oukoop, Sluipwijk, Wiltenburg, Vrijhoef en Kalverbroek, parts of Zwammerdam, Lange Ruige Weide, Hekendorp, Land van Stein, Rietveld and Barwoutswaarder, as well as the communities of Driebruggen, Hogebrug, Langeweide, Meije, Nieuwerbrug, Oud-Reeuwijk, Platteweg, Randenburg, Reeuwijk-Brug, Reeuwijk-Dorp, Tempel, Oud-Bodegraven (Vrijenes), Weijpoort and Reeuwijk-Westeinde.

=== Topography ===
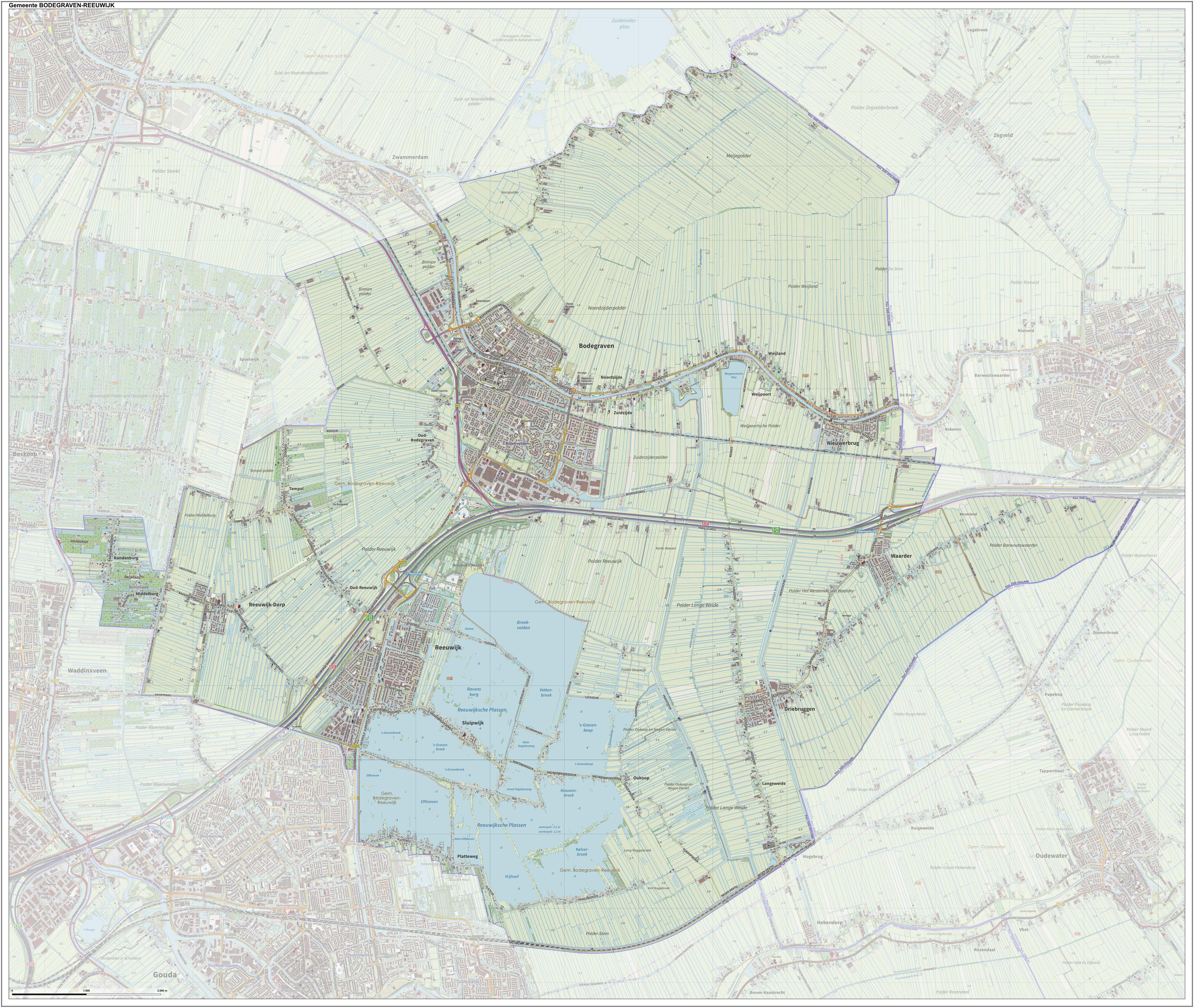
Topographic map of the municipality of Bodegraven-Reeuwijk, June 2015

== Paedophilia rumours ==
In 2020, false allegations were circulated online, that in the 1980s the town had been the site of the sexual abuse and murder of a number of children. In 2022, this led the town's authorities to take legal action to have the allegations removed from Twitter. The council lost the case.

== Notable people ==
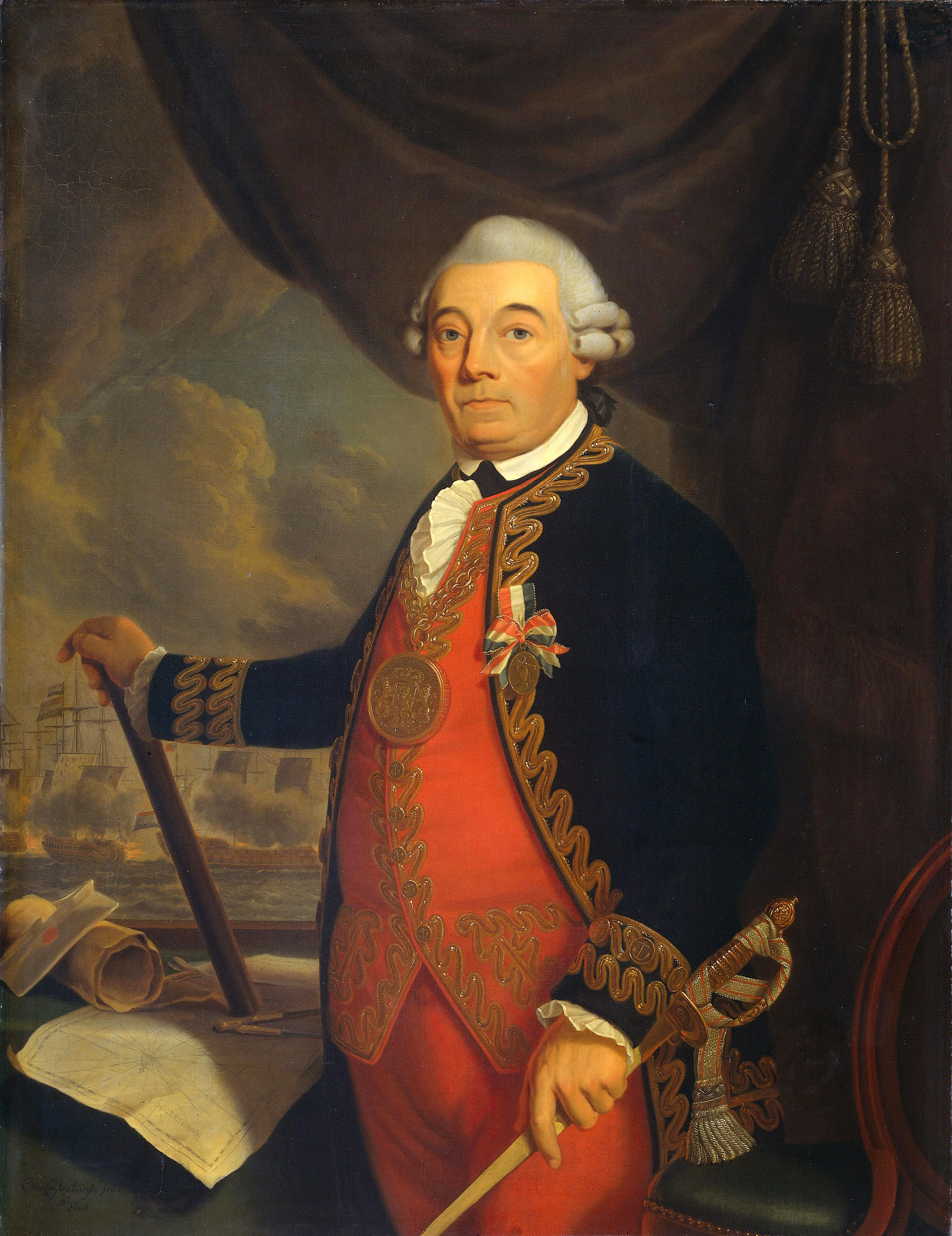
Johan Arnold Zoutman, 1801

- Pieter Verhoek (1633 in Bodegraven – 1702) a Dutch Golden Age poet and painter.
- Dominicus van Tol (ca.1635 in Bodegraven – 1676) a Dutch Golden Age painter
- Gijsbert Verhoek (1644 in Bodegraven – 1690) a Dutch Golden Age painter.
- Johan Zoutman (1724 in Reeuwijk – 1793) a Rear Admiral
- Jan Ceton (1875 in Bodegraven – 1943) a left-wing politician
- Maarten de Niet Gerritzoon (1904 in Bodegraven – 1979) a politician
- Jacob Korevaar (1923 in Lange Ruige Weide – 2025) a mathematician and academic
- Arnold Merkies (born 1968 in Bodegraven) a politician

=== Sport ===
- Jaap Beije (1927 in Bodegraven – 2013) a rower, competed at the 1952 Summer Olympics
- Ria van Velsen (born 1939 in Bodegraven) a retired artistic gymnast who participated in the 1960 Summer Olympics
- Marjorie van de Bunt (born 1968 in Reeuwijk) a Paralympian athlete competing in Biathlon and Cross-country skiing

== Gallery ==
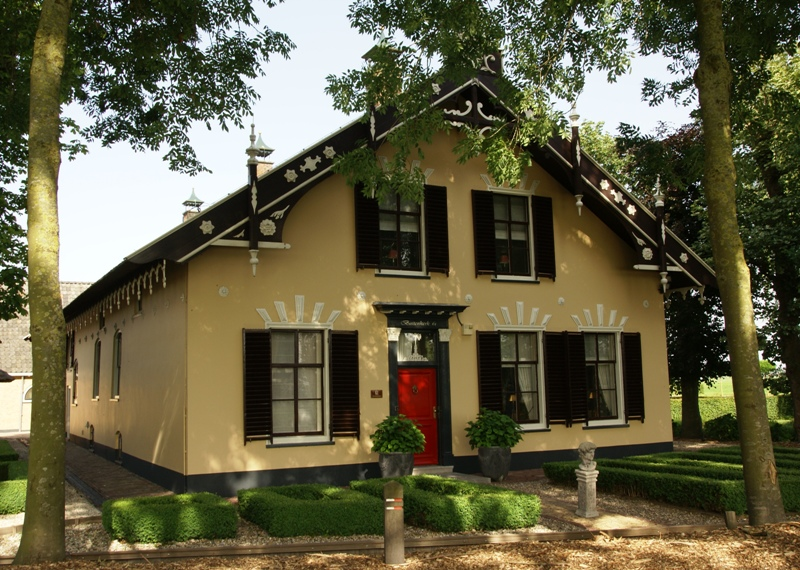
Bodegraven, Buitenkerk

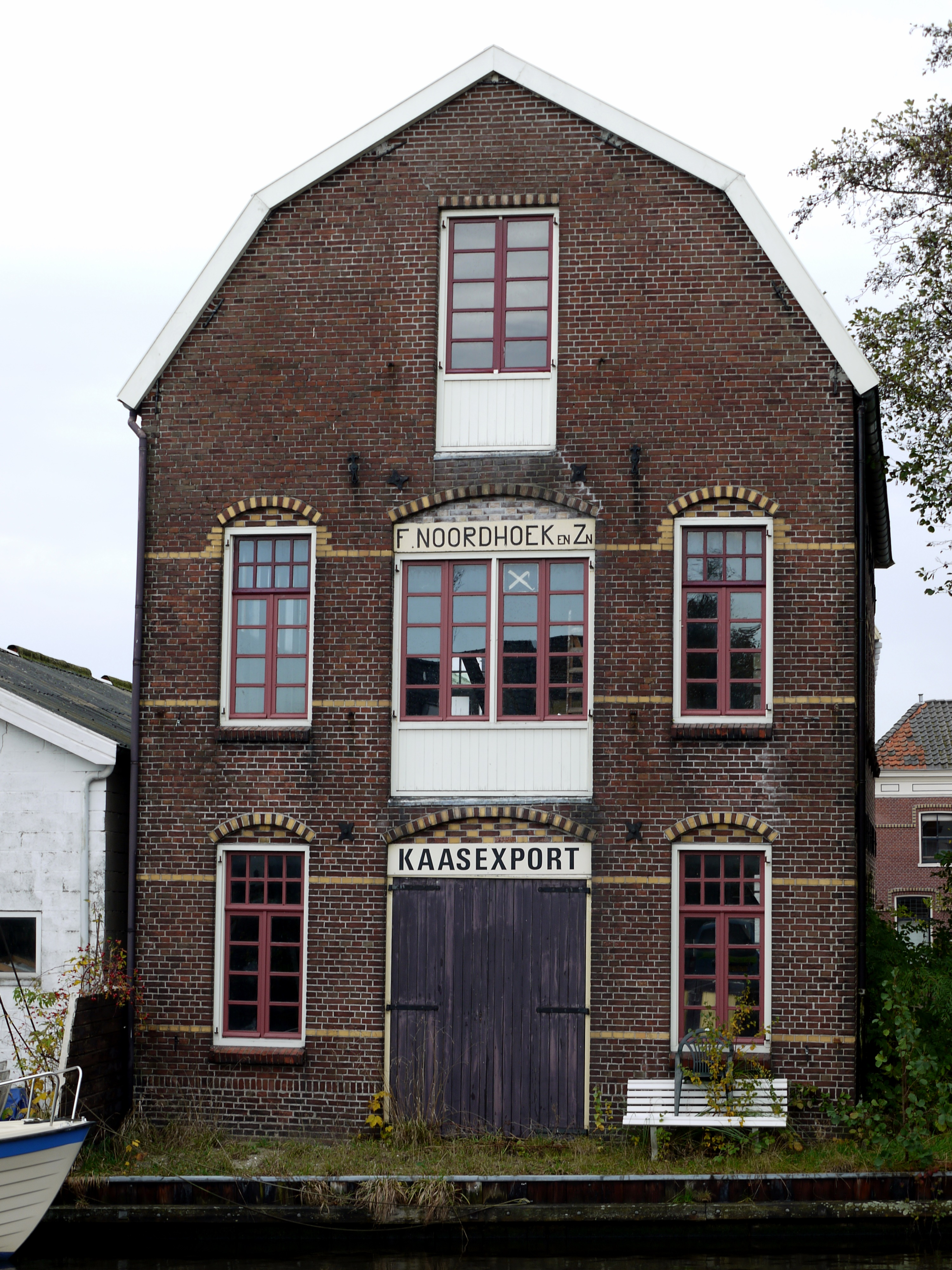
Kaaspakhuis Noordhoek. Bodegraven (old cheese warehouse)

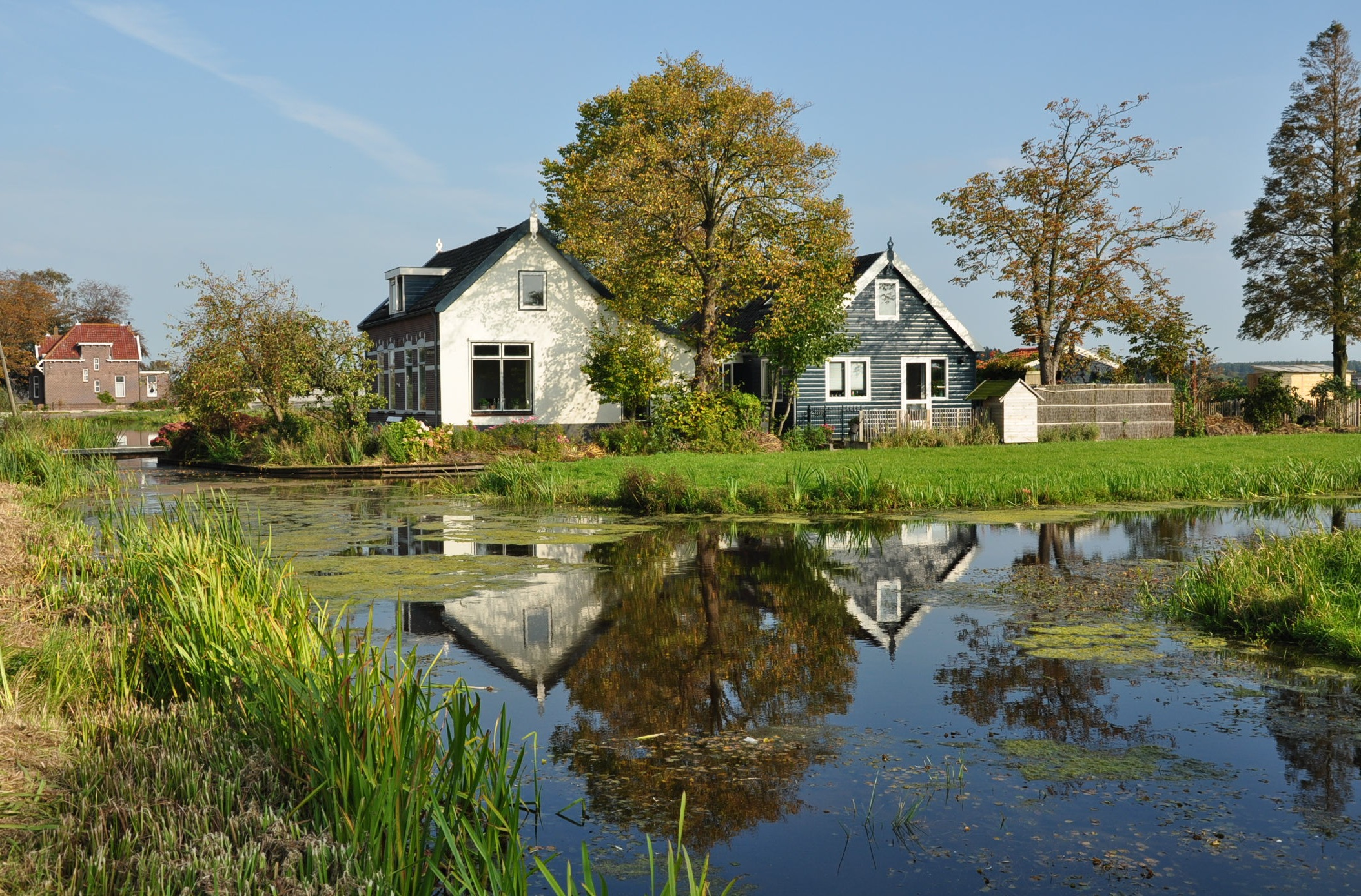
Netherlands, Bodegraven-Reeuwijk, Tempel

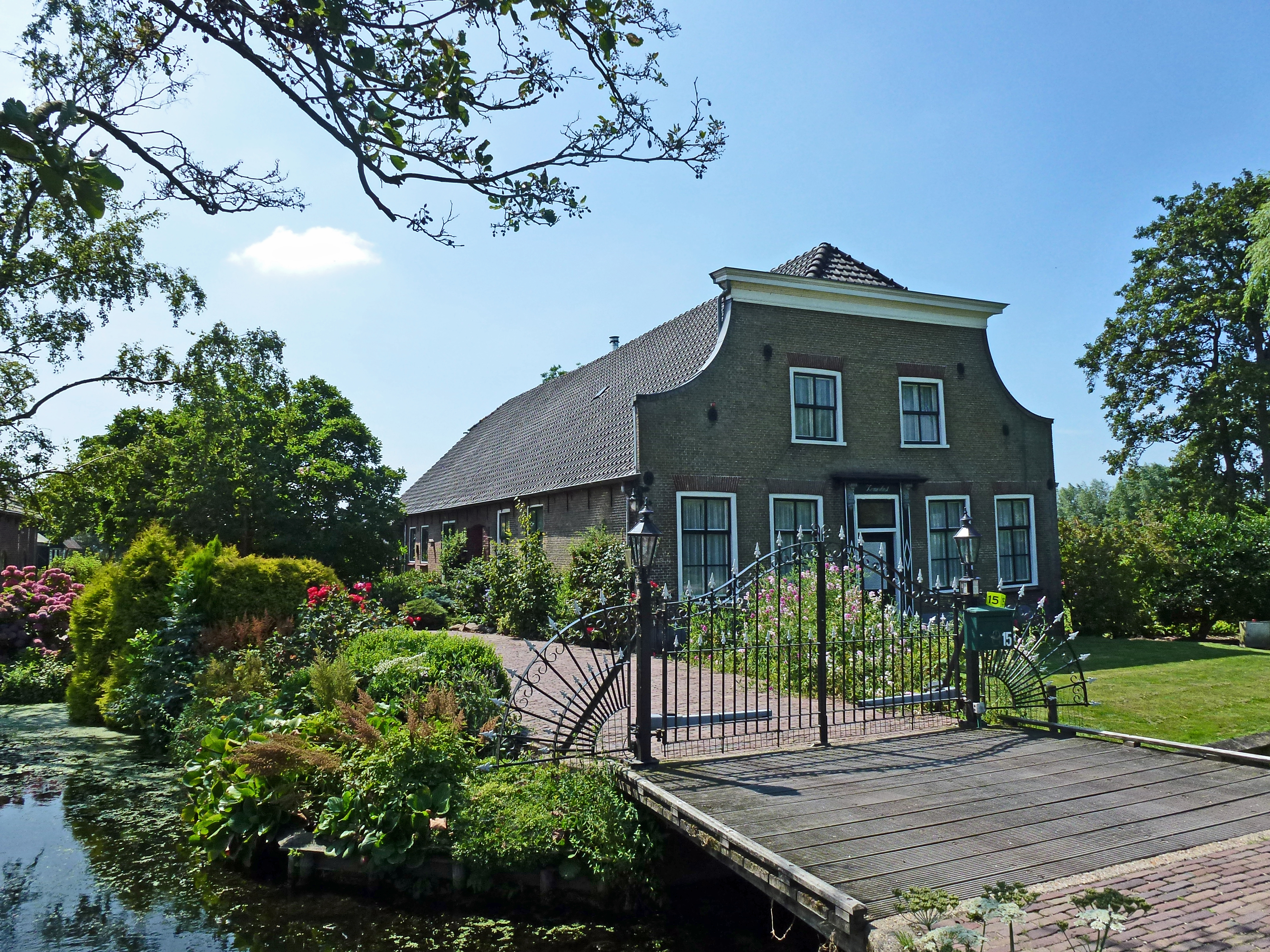
Oud Reeuwijkseweg, Reeuwijk
