= Wiltenburg =

Wiltenburg is a historic municipality and former free manor (vrije heerlijkheid) in the Dutch province of South Holland, on the southeastern edge of the Reeuwijkse Plassen. It historically consists of one estate, surrounded by 7 hectares of swampy farmland.

== History ==
When the municipal system was introduced in the early 19th century, Wiltenburg was not formally administered by any province. An old provincial boundary stone was located in nearby Oukoop, marking the border between Holland and Utrecht. Until 1820 Wiltenburg was (provisionally) administered by Sluipwijk, after that the lord resident of the estate claimed his rights to a municipality. For one year Wiltenburg was a separate municipality, however the original declaration of the establishment of the free manor went missing. Being unable to produce the document, the lord resident was deprived of his municipal rights and in 1821 Wiltenburg became part of Sluipwijk again. Neighboring Oukoop was merged with Hekendorp in 1855, while Sluipwijk merged with Reeuwijk in 1870. Eventually the whole region became part of the current municipality of Bodegraven-Reeuwijk in 2011. Currently, with additional houses constructed in later days, Wiltenburg has about 10 inhabitants.

== Miscellaneous ==
Wiltenburg, with just 0.07 square kilometers, has the second smallest area of any historic municipality in the Netherlands (after Eembrugge). The coat of arms of the free manor can be seen on the front gate and shows a shield azure, charged with a fleur-de-lis or and held by two lions rampant guardant or. A flag was designed based on the arms, being vertically divided into a white and a blue part, the white half charged with a red lion rampant guardant and the blue half charged with a yellow lily.
