= Lange Ruige Weide =

Coordinates: 52.043728°N 4.798365°E

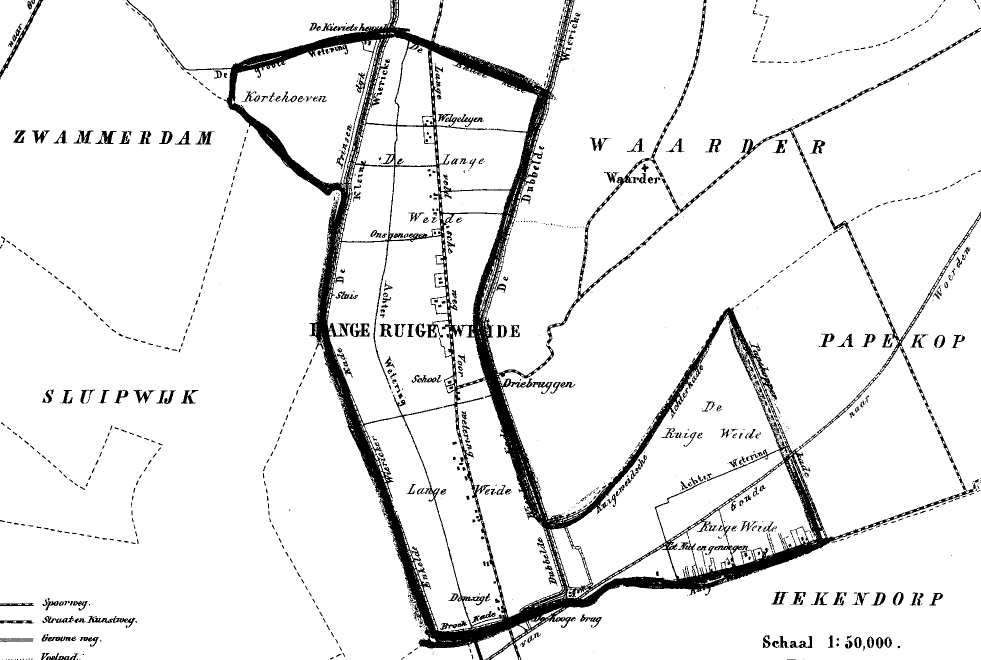
Lange Ruige Weide map

Lange Ruige Weide is a former municipality in the Dutch province of South Holland. It was located west of the city of Oudewater, and covered the hamlets of Langeweide and Ruigeweide.

Lange Ruige Weide was a separate municipality from 1818 to 1964, when it became part of Driebruggen.
