= Driebruggen =

- Village
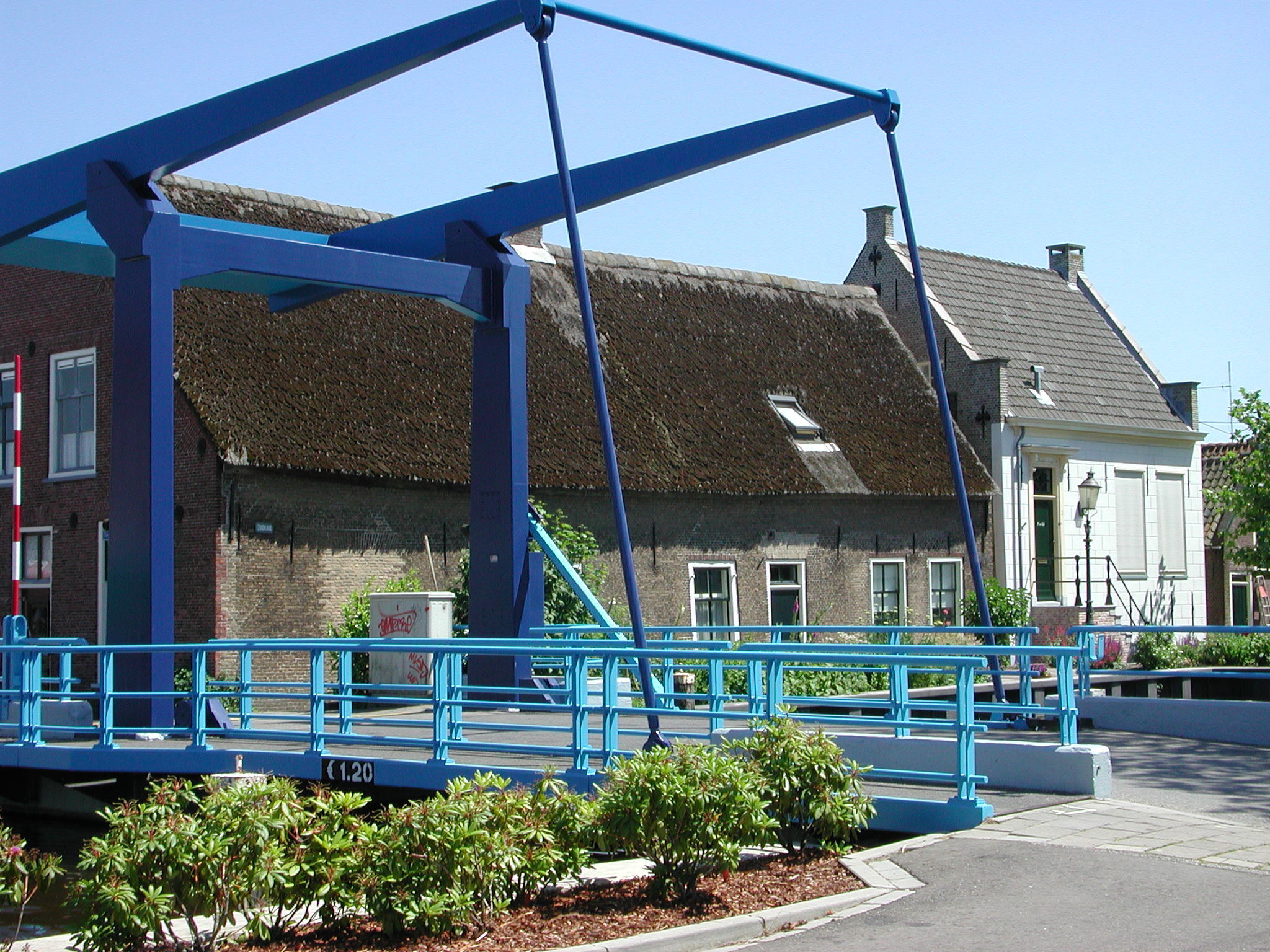
- Bridge over the Dubbele Wiericke in Driebruggen

- Location in the province of South Holland in the Netherlands Location in the Netherlands
- Coordinates: 52°2′36″N 4°47′55″E
- Country: Netherlands
- Province: South Holland
- Municipality: Bodegraven-Reeuwijk

Area
  - Total: 6.38 km^{2} (2.46 sq mi)
- Elevation: −1.7 m (−5.6 ft)

Population (2021)
  - Total: 2,005
  - Density: 314/km^{2} (814/sq mi)
- Time zone: UTC+1 (CET)
  - Summer (DST): UTC+2 (CEST)
- Postal code: 3465
- Dialing code: 0348

Driebruggen is a village in the Dutch province of South Holland. It is a part of the former municipality of Reeuwijk, and lies about 6 km east of Gouda.

According to the 1615 map of Rijnland, there were indeed three bridge in Driebruggen. Driebruggen is a road village without a church which developed in the 17th century near the bridge over the Dubbele Wiericke.

Driebruggen was a separate municipality between 1964 and 1989. The name from this village means 3 bridges. It was created in a merger of Hekendorp, Lange Ruige Weide, Papekop, and Waarder.

== Gallery ==
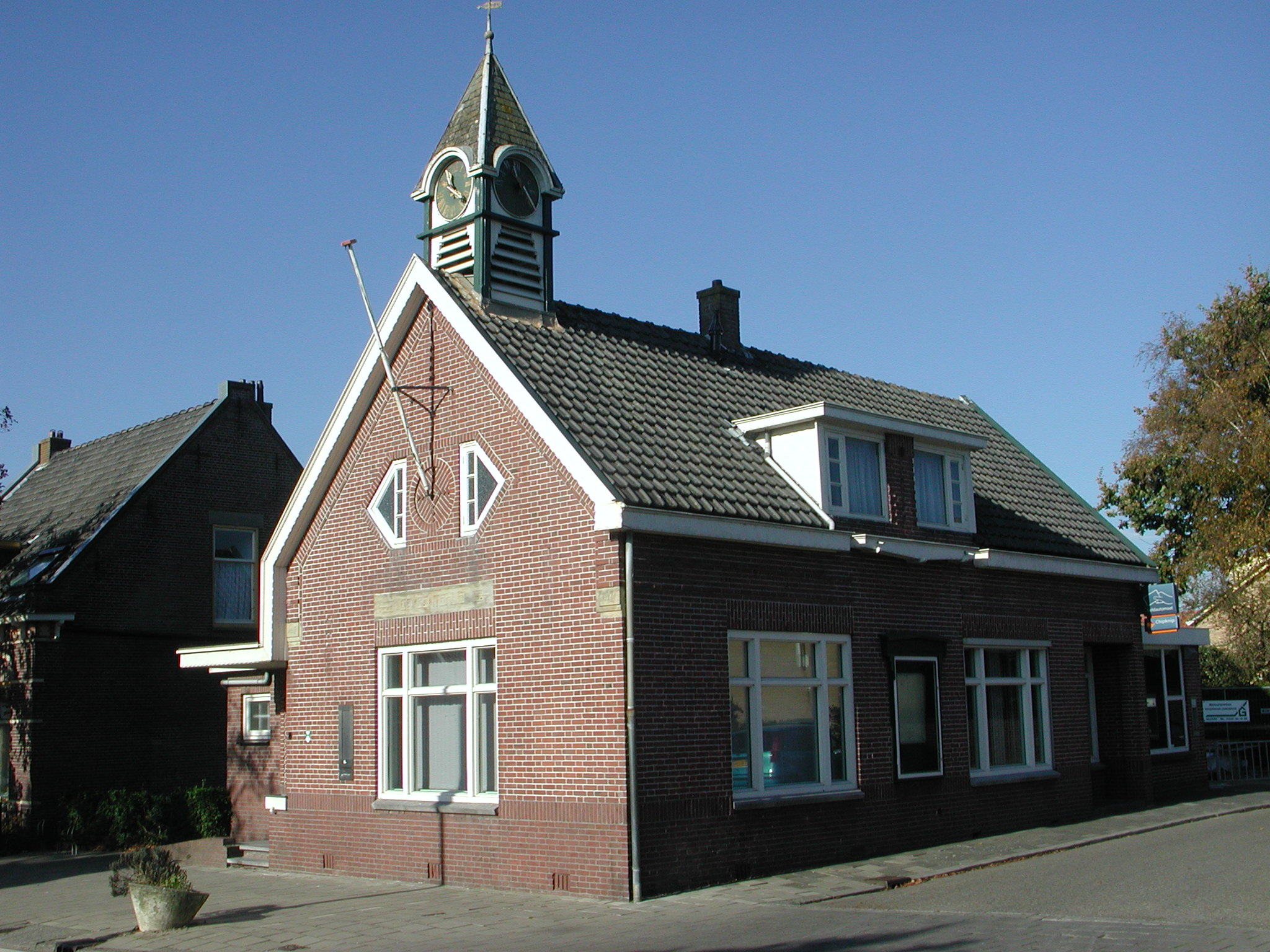
Former town hall

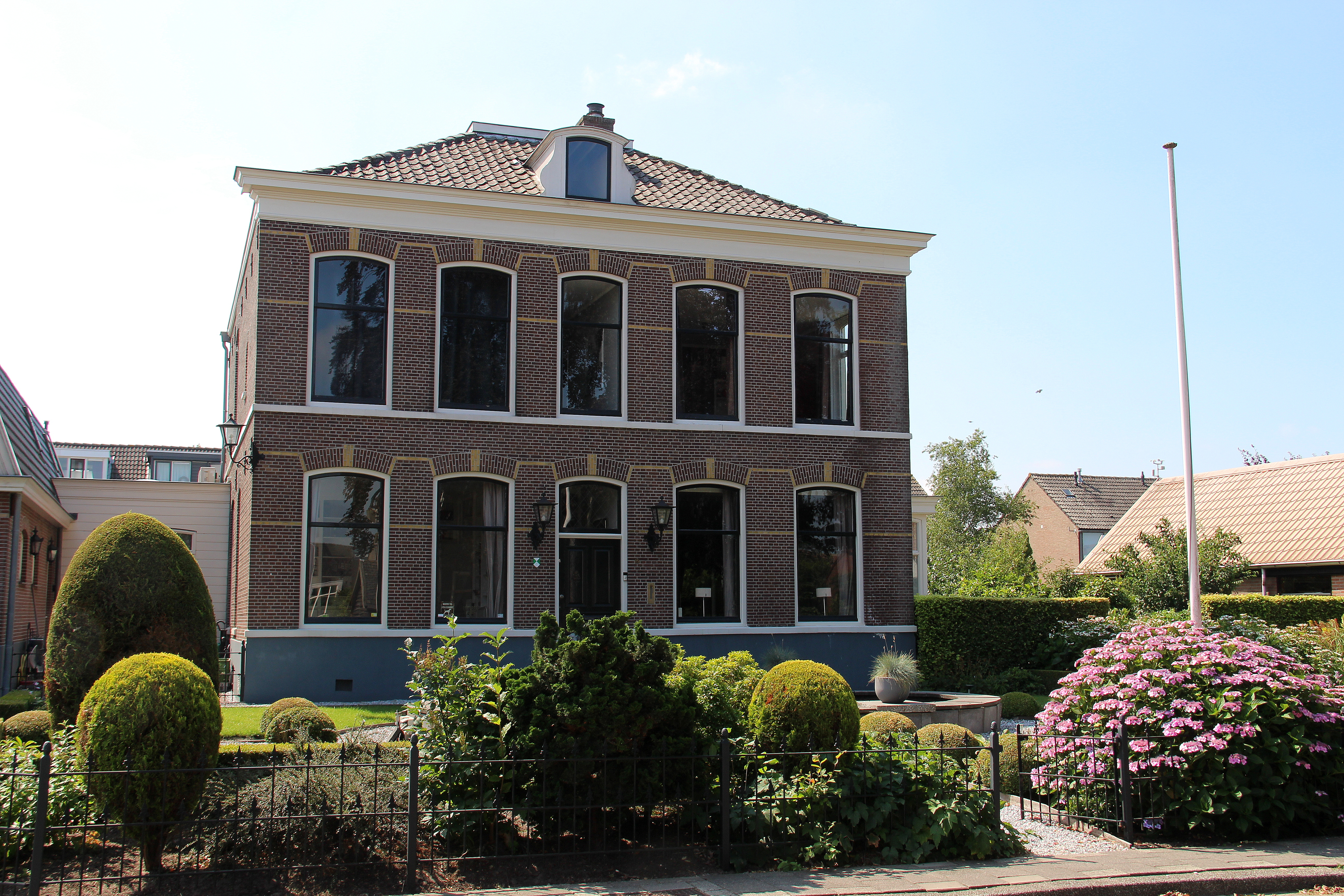
Villa in Driebruggen

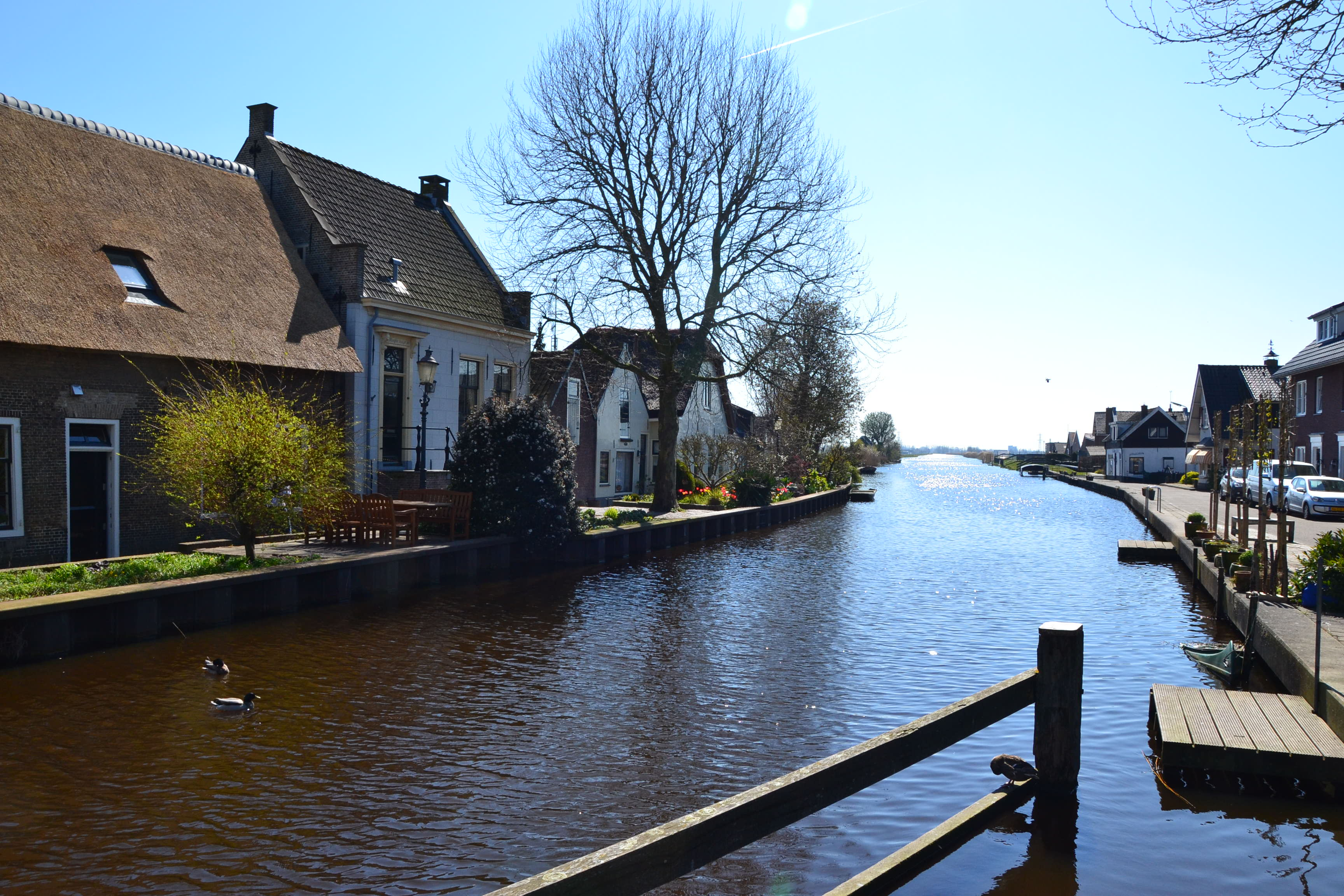
View on the canal
