= Ruigeweide =

- Hamlet
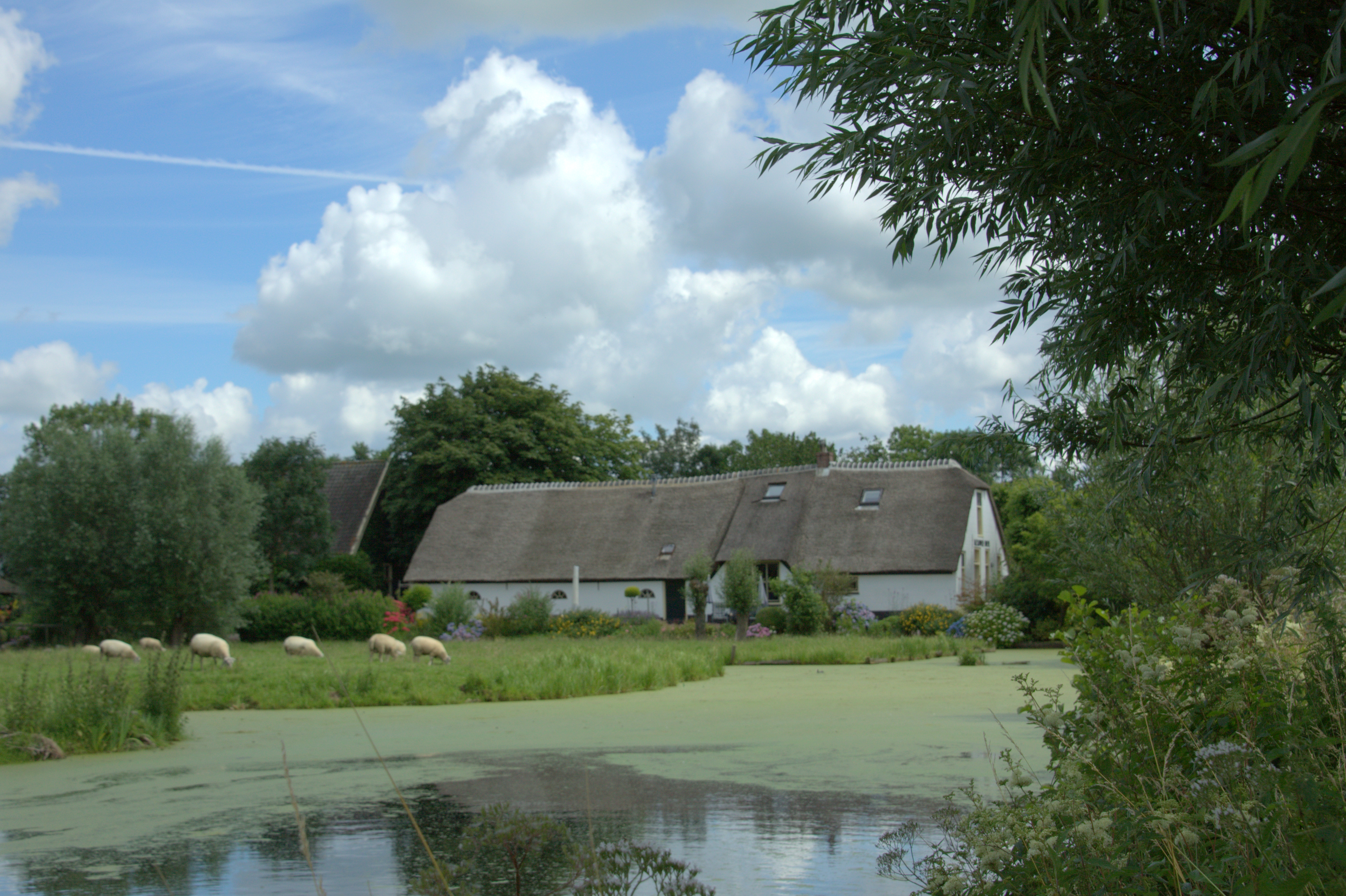
- Farm in Ruigeweide

- Location in the Netherlands Ruigeweide (Netherlands)
- Coordinates: 52°01′47″N 4°49′50″E
- Country: Netherlands
- Province: Utrecht
- Municipality: Oudewater

Area
  - Total: 4.78 km^{2} (1.85 sq mi)

Population (2021)
  - Total: 105
  - Density: 22.0/km^{2} (56.9/sq mi)
- Time zone: UTC+1 (CET)
  - Summer (DST): UTC+2 (CEST)
- Postal code: 3421
- Dialing code: 0348

Ruigeweide is a hamlet in the Dutch province of Utrecht. It is a part of the municipality of Oudewater, and lies about 2 km northwest of the city of Oudewater.

It was first mentioned in 1371 as "in de ruwer weyde, ende op ter langher weyde", and means meadow with rough vegetation. Also to distinguish it from Langeweide. The postal authorities have placed it under Oudewater. The hamlet has no place name signs. In 1840, Ruigeweide was home to 84 people.
