= Weijpoort =

Nieuwerbrug
- Hamlet
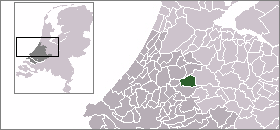

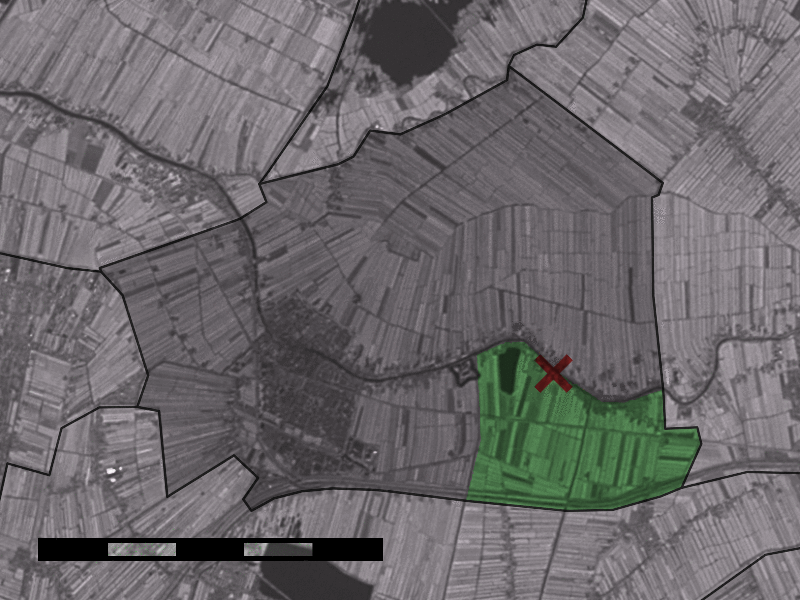
- The village (dark red) and the statistical district (light green) of Nieuwerbrug in the former municipality of Bodegraven.
- Coordinates: 52°04′54″N 4°47′59″E
- Country: Netherlands
- Province: South Holland
- Municipality: Bodegraven-Reeuwijk

Population (2008)
  - Total: 1,370
- Time zone: UTC+1 (CET)
  - Summer (DST): UTC+2 (CEST)

Nieuwerbrug is a village in the Dutch province of South Holland. It is a part of the municipality of Bodegraven-Reeuwijk, and lies about 5 km west of Woerden.

The statistical area "Nieuwerbrug", which also can include the surrounding countryside, has a population of around 1270.
