= Hogebrug =

- Village
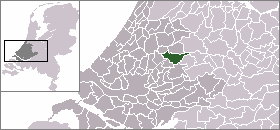

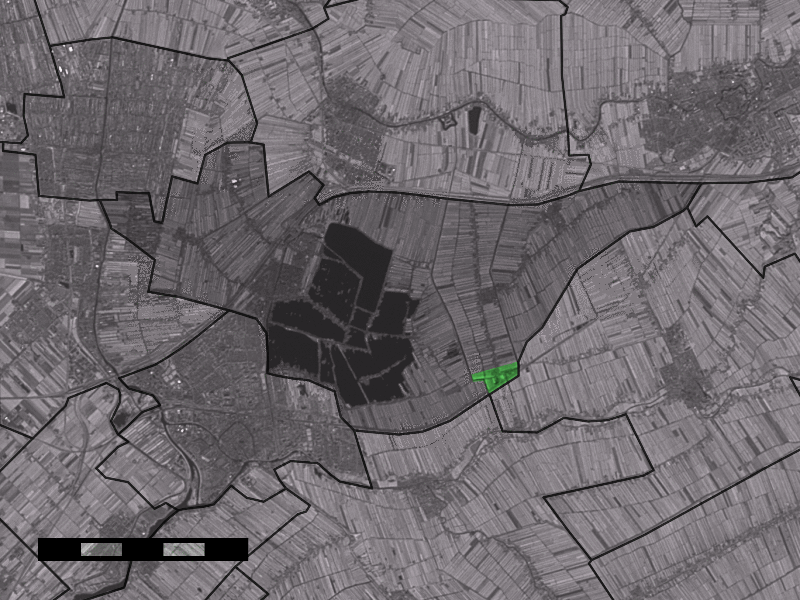
- Hogebrug in the municipality of Reeuwijk.
- Coordinates: 52°1′32″N 4°48′10″E
- Country: Netherlands
- Province: South Holland
- Municipality: Bodegraven-Reeuwijk

Population (1 January 2005)
  - Total: 120
- Time zone: UTC+1 (CET)
  - Summer (DST): UTC+2 (CEST)

Hogebrug is a village in the Dutch province of South Holland. It is a part of the former municipality of Reeuwijk, and lies about 6 km east of Gouda.

The statistical area "Hogebrug", which also can include the surrounding countryside, has a population of around 120.
