= Reeuwijk-Dorp =

- Village
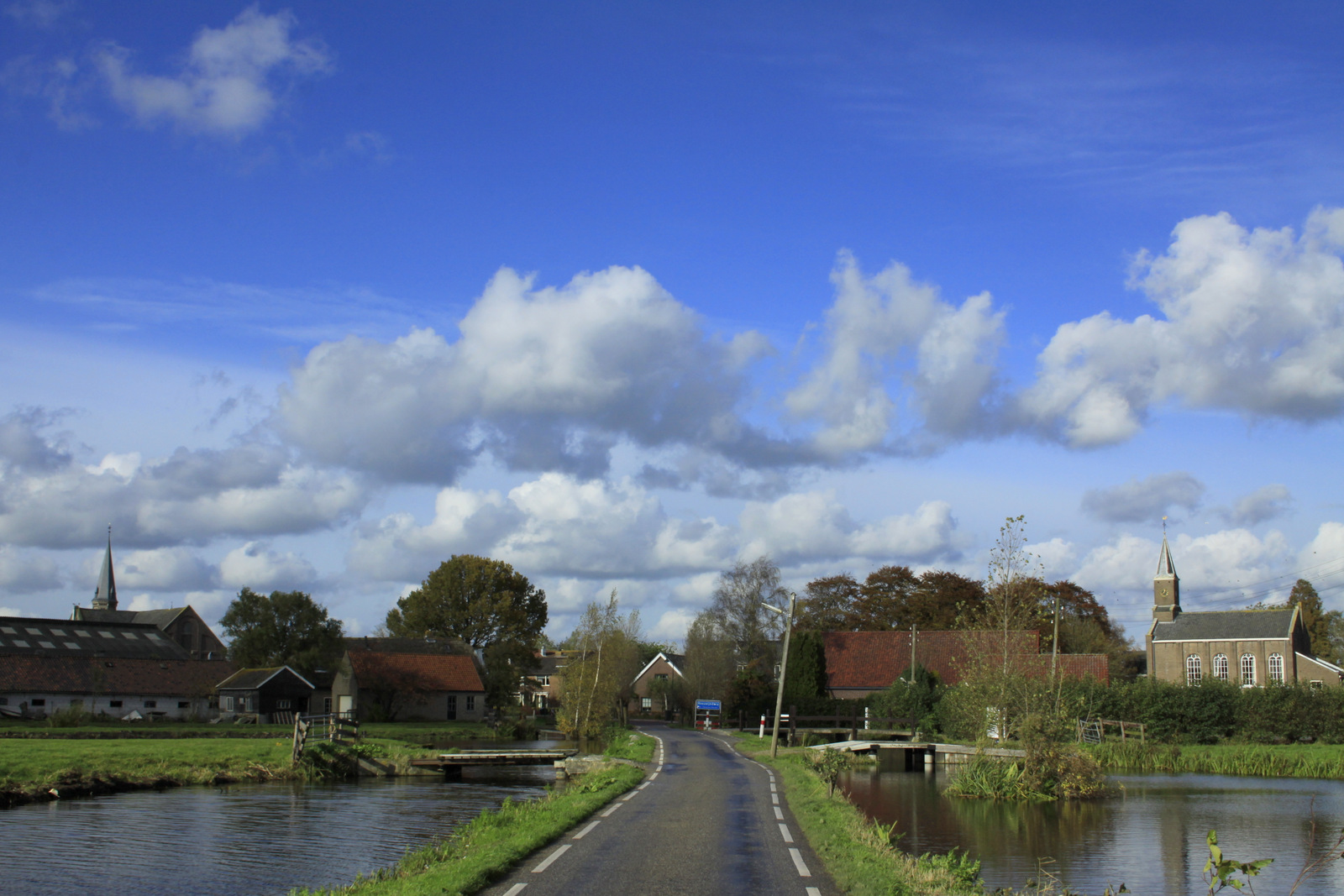

- Location in the province of South Holland in the Netherlands Location in the Netherlands
- Coordinates: 52°03′18″N 4°41′27″E
- Country: Netherlands
- Province: South Holland
- Municipality: Bodegraven-Reeuwijk

Area
  - Total: 11.45 km^{2} (4.42 sq mi)
- Elevation: −1.5 m (−4.9 ft)

Population (2021)
  - Total: 1,995
  - Density: 174.2/km^{2} (451.3/sq mi)
- Time zone: UTC+1 (CET)
  - Summer (DST): UTC+2 (CEST)
- Postal code: 2811
- Dialing code: 0182

Reeuwijk-Dorp is a village in the Dutch province of South Holland. It is part of what used to be the municipality of Reeuwijk. It lies about 5 km north of Gouda. "Dorp" is Dutch for village, the name distinguishes from Reeuwijk-Brug which is situated 3 km to the east.

Reeuwijk-Drop is a stretched out peat excavation village from the Middle Ages. The Catholic St Paul and Peter Church is a Gothic Revival church built between 1889 and 1890. It is characterised by its short nave.

Reeuwijk-Dorp was originally the main village, however the Reeuwijk-Brug was more strategically located and became the seat of the municipality from the mid-19th century onwards. In 2011, the municipality was merged into Bodegraven-Reeuwijk.

== Gallery ==
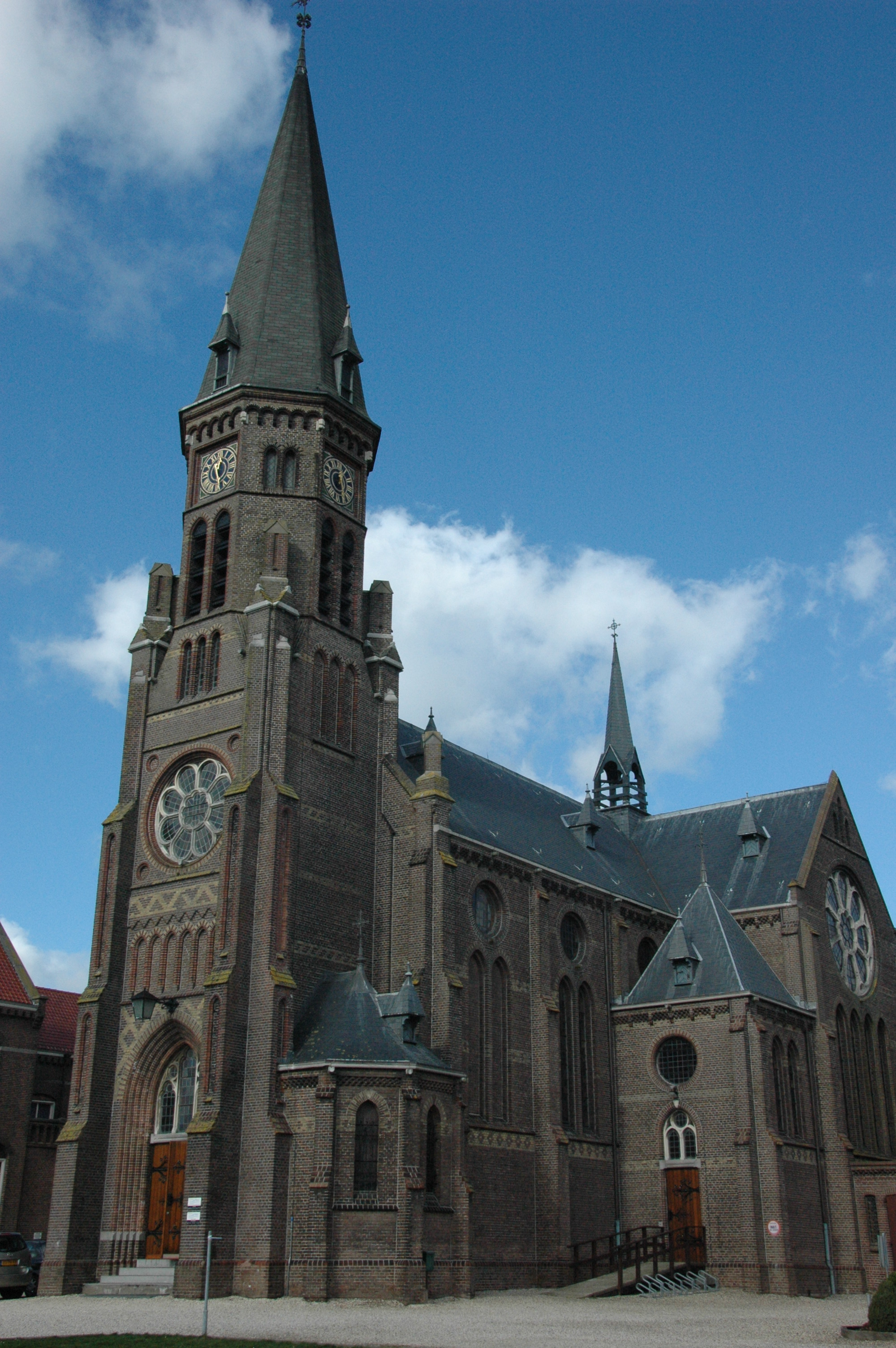
St Paul and Peter church

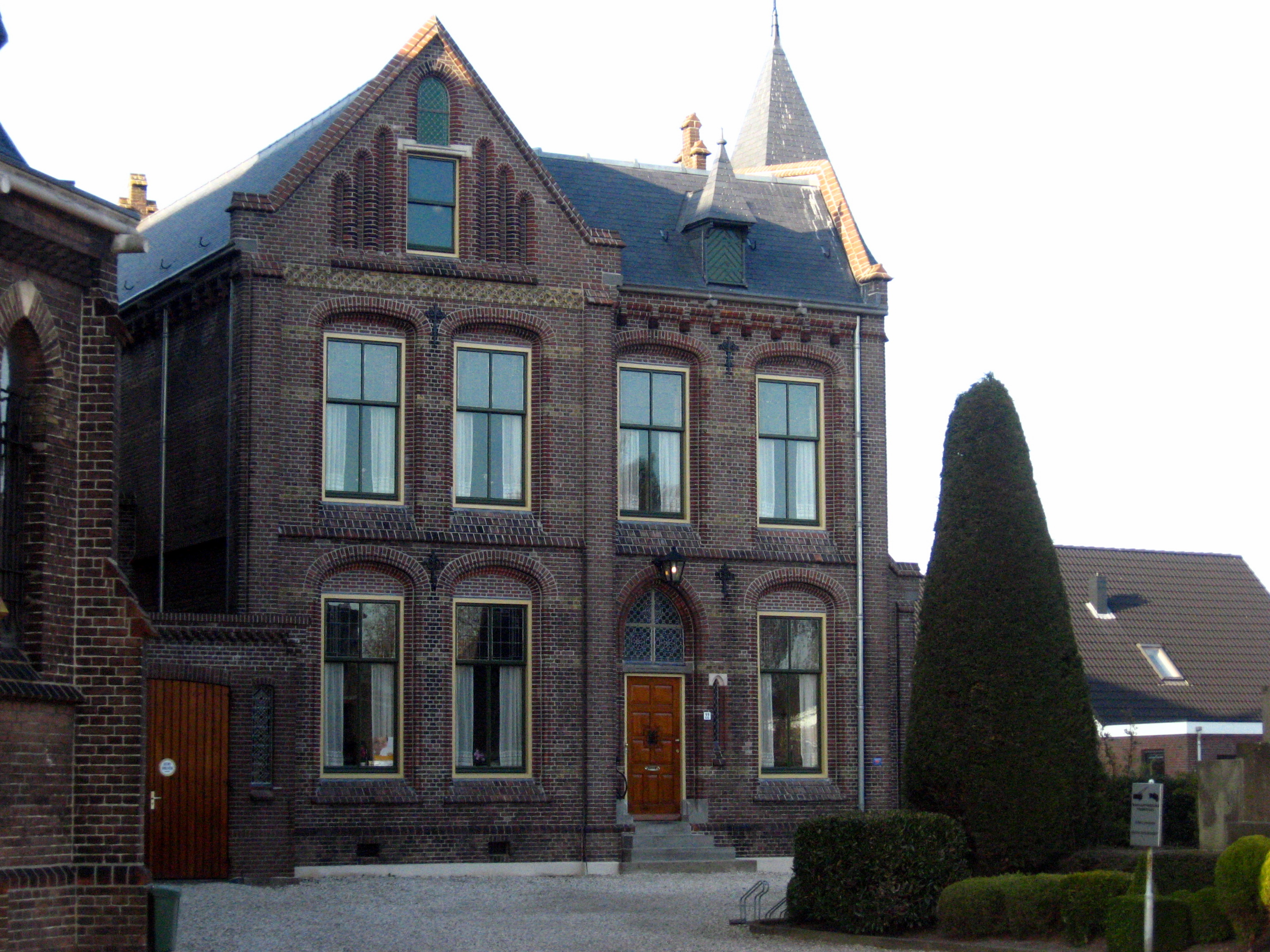
Clergy house

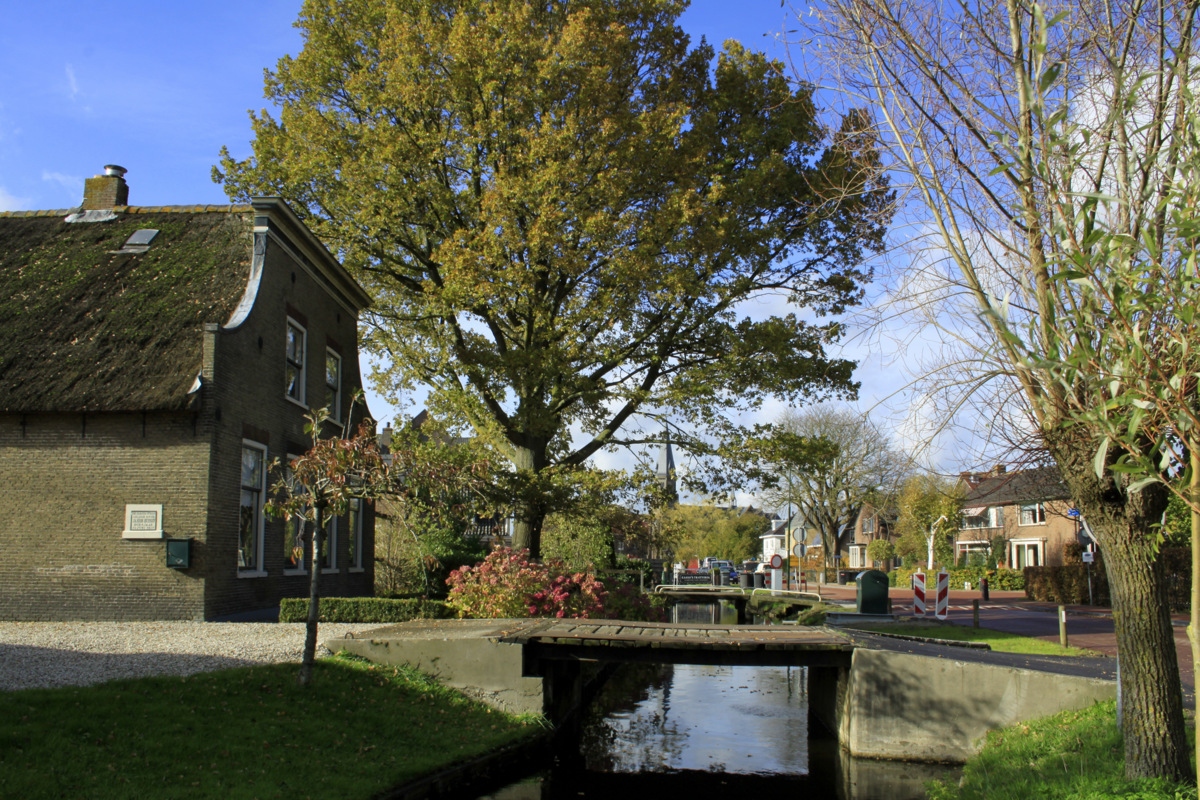
Canal view
