= Middelburg, South Holland =

Middelburg
- Hamlet
- Location in the province of South Holland in the Netherlands Location in the Netherlands
- Coordinates: 52°03′25″N 4°40′54″E
- Country: Netherlands
- Province: South Holland
- Municipality: Bodegraven-Reeuwijk

Population (2007)
  - Total: 220
- Time zone: UTC+1 (CET)
  - Summer (DST): UTC+2 (CEST)

Middelburg is a hamlet in the Dutch province of South Holland. It is located about 2 km east of Waddinxveen, in the former municipality of Reeuwijk.

The statistical area "Middelburg", which also includes parts of the surrounding countryside, has a population of around 260.

Middelburg was a separate municipality from 1817 to 1855, when it became part of Reeuwijk.
