= Barwoutswaarder =

- Neighbourhood and hamlet
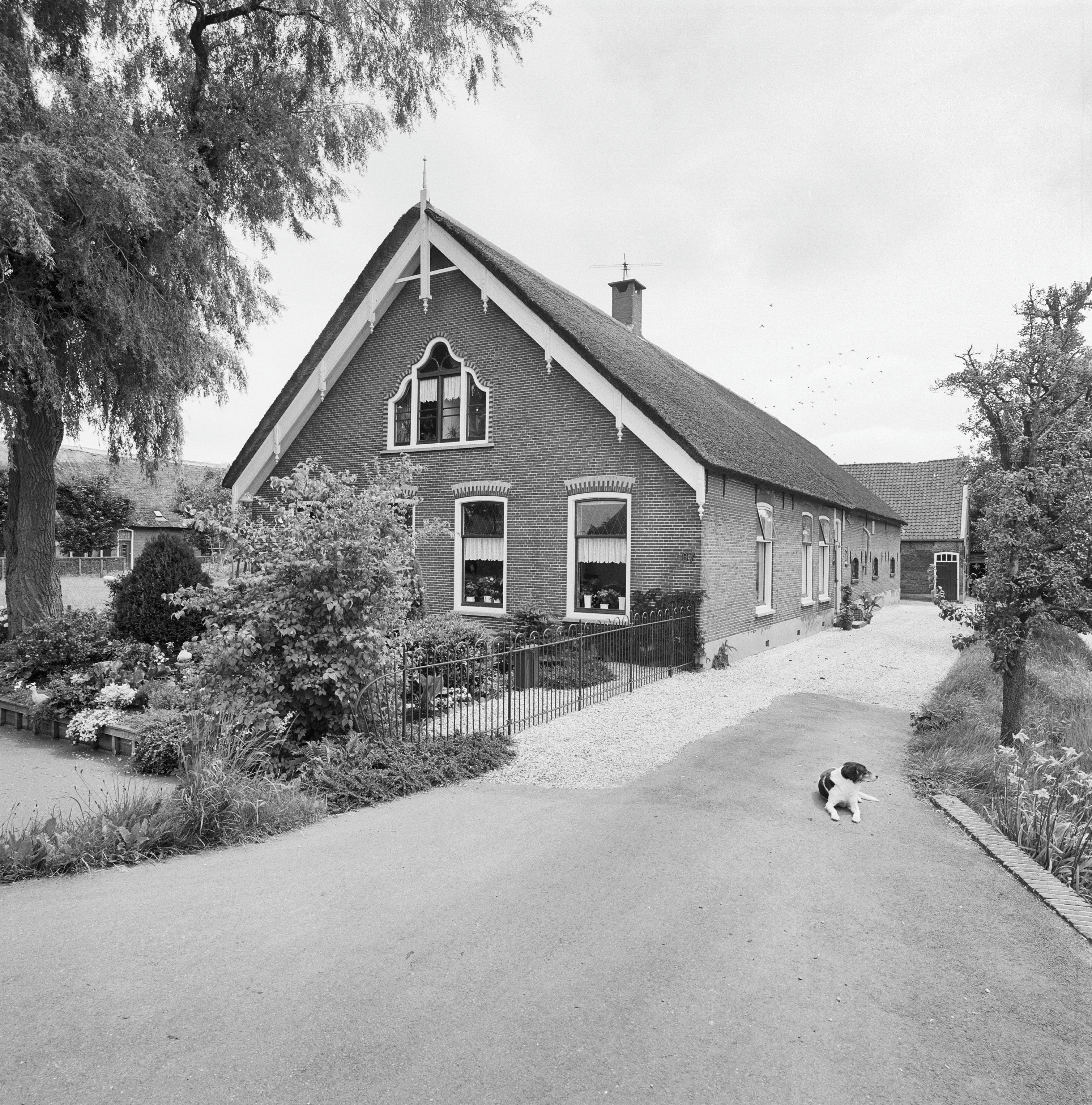
- Farm in Barwoutswaarder

- Location in the Netherlands Barwoutswaarder (Netherlands)
- Coordinates: 52°4′57″N 4°51′49″E
- Country: Netherlands
- Province: Utrecht
- Municipality: Woerden

Area
  - Total: 0.55 km^{2} (0.21 sq mi)
- Elevation: 0.5 m (1.6 ft)

Population (2021)
  - Total: 280
  - Density: 510/km^{2} (1,300/sq mi)
- Time zone: UTC+1 (CET)
  - Summer (DST): UTC+2 (CEST)
- Postal code: 3449
- Dialing code: 0348

Barwoutswaarder is a neighbourhood of Woerden and a hamlet in the municipality of Woerden in the Dutch province of Utrecht. It is located to the west of the city of Woerden. Nowadays it's part of the urban area of Woerden and a neighbourhood and industrial zone.

Until 1964, Barwoutswaarder was a separate municipality (then in the province of South Holland). The municipality was created in 1817; between 1812 and 1817, the village was part of Waarder.

The hamlet was first mentioned in 1179 as Berenwerde. The etymology is unclear. In 1840, it was home to 366 people.
