= Sluipwijk =

- Village
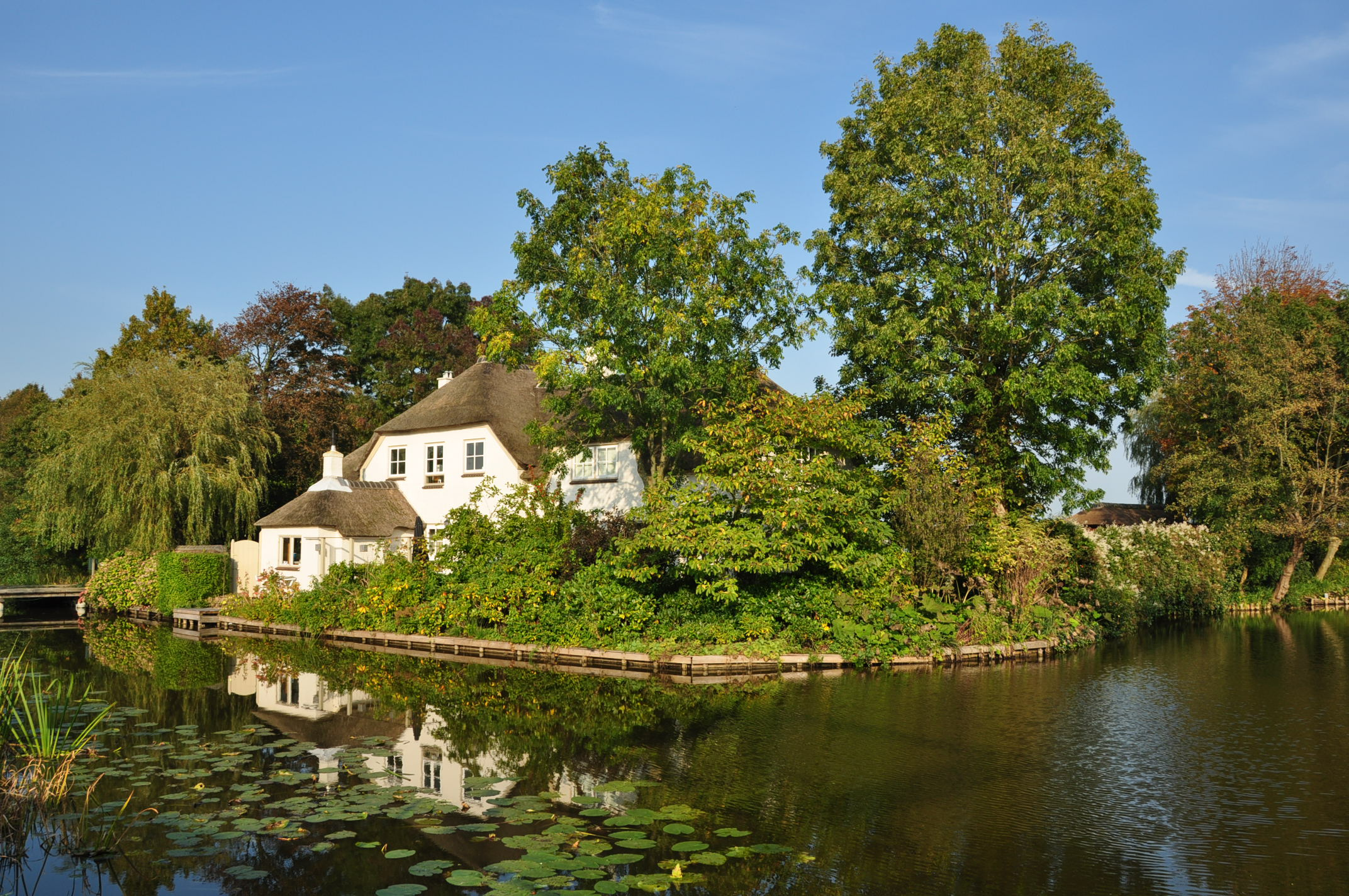
- Farm in Sluipwijk

- Location in the province of South Holland in the Netherlands Location in the Netherlands
- Coordinates: 52°02′19″N 4°44′31″E
- Country: Netherlands
- Province: South Holland
- Municipality: Bodegraven-Reeuwijk

Area
  - Total: 5.02 km^{2} (1.94 sq mi)

Population (2021)
  - Total: 405
  - Density: 80.7/km^{2} (209/sq mi)
- Time zone: UTC+1 (CET)
  - Summer (DST): UTC+2 (CEST)
- Postal code: 2811
- Dialing code: 0182

Sluipwijk is a village in the Dutch province of South Holland. It is a part of the former municipality of Reeuwijk, and lies about 3 km northeast of Gouda. The villages is surrounded by the lakes of the Reeuwijkse Plassen.

The village was first mentioned between 1280 and 1287 as slupewiic. The etymology is unclear. Sluipwijk is a linear settlement inside the Reeuwijkse Plassen, a lake area which developed as a result of the peat excavation in the area.

Sluipwijk was a separate municipality until 1870, when it became part of Reeuwijk. In 1821, Wiltenburg had been added to Sluipwijk.

== Gallery ==
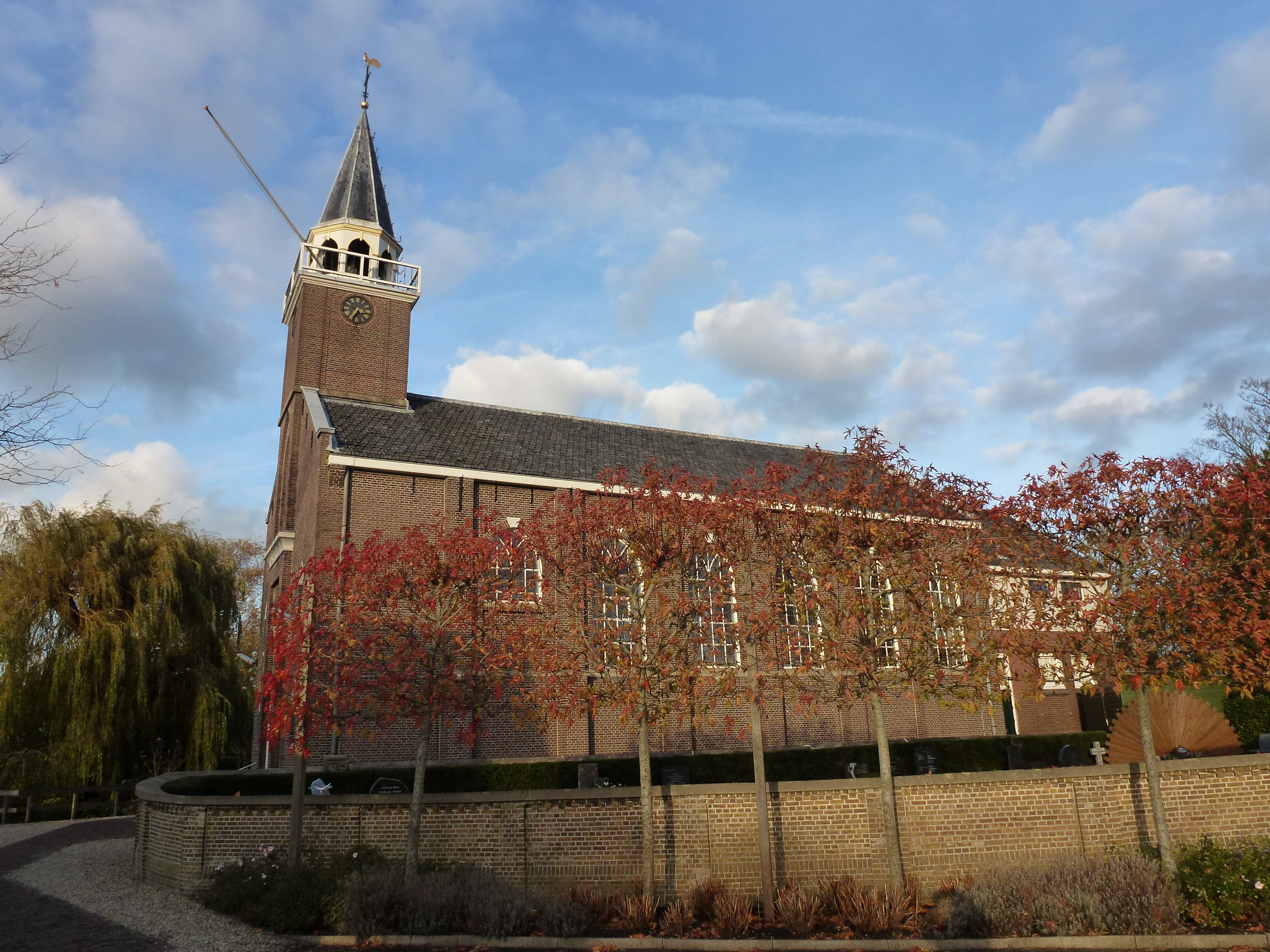
Dutch Reformed church

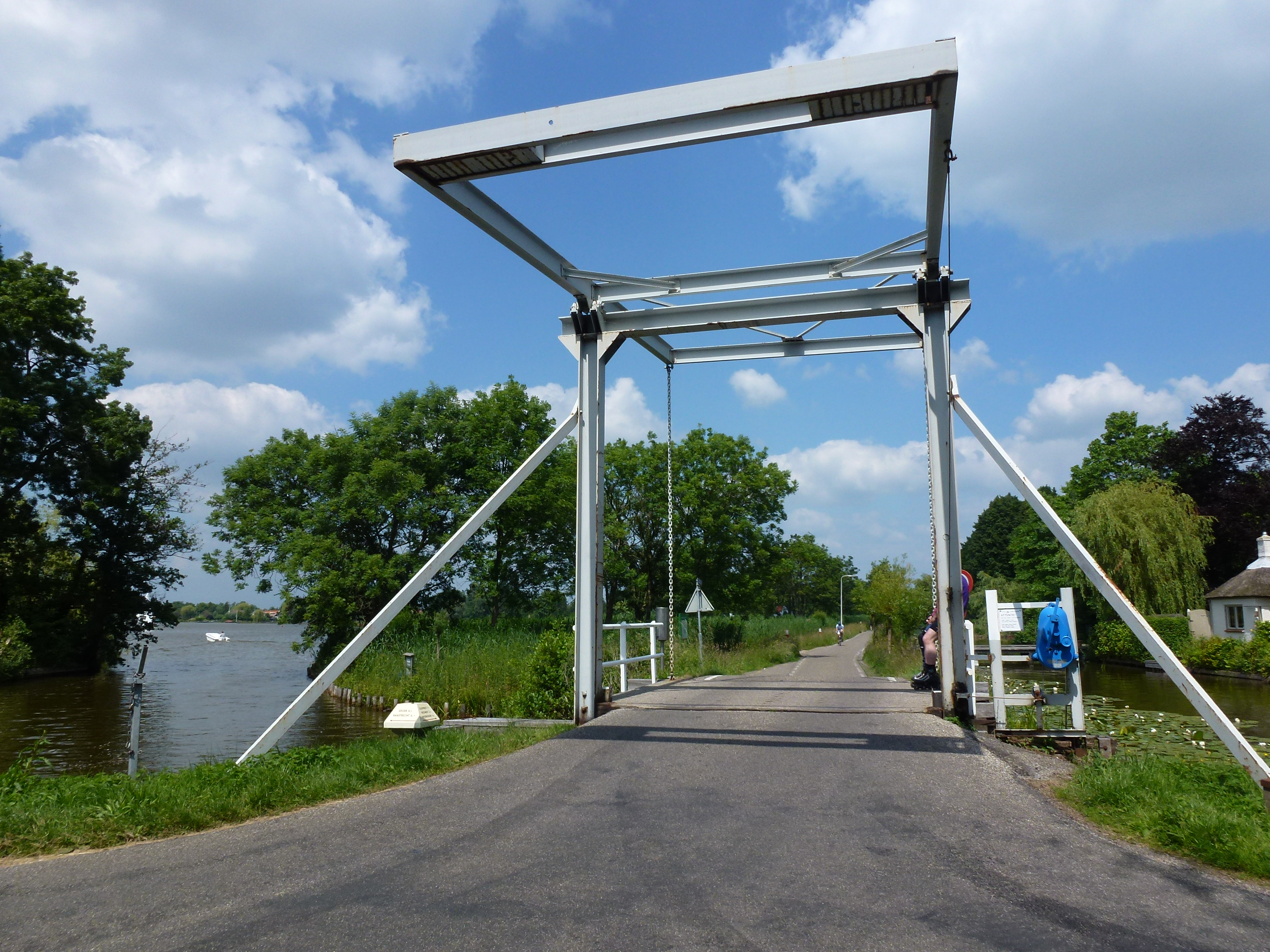
Draw bridge

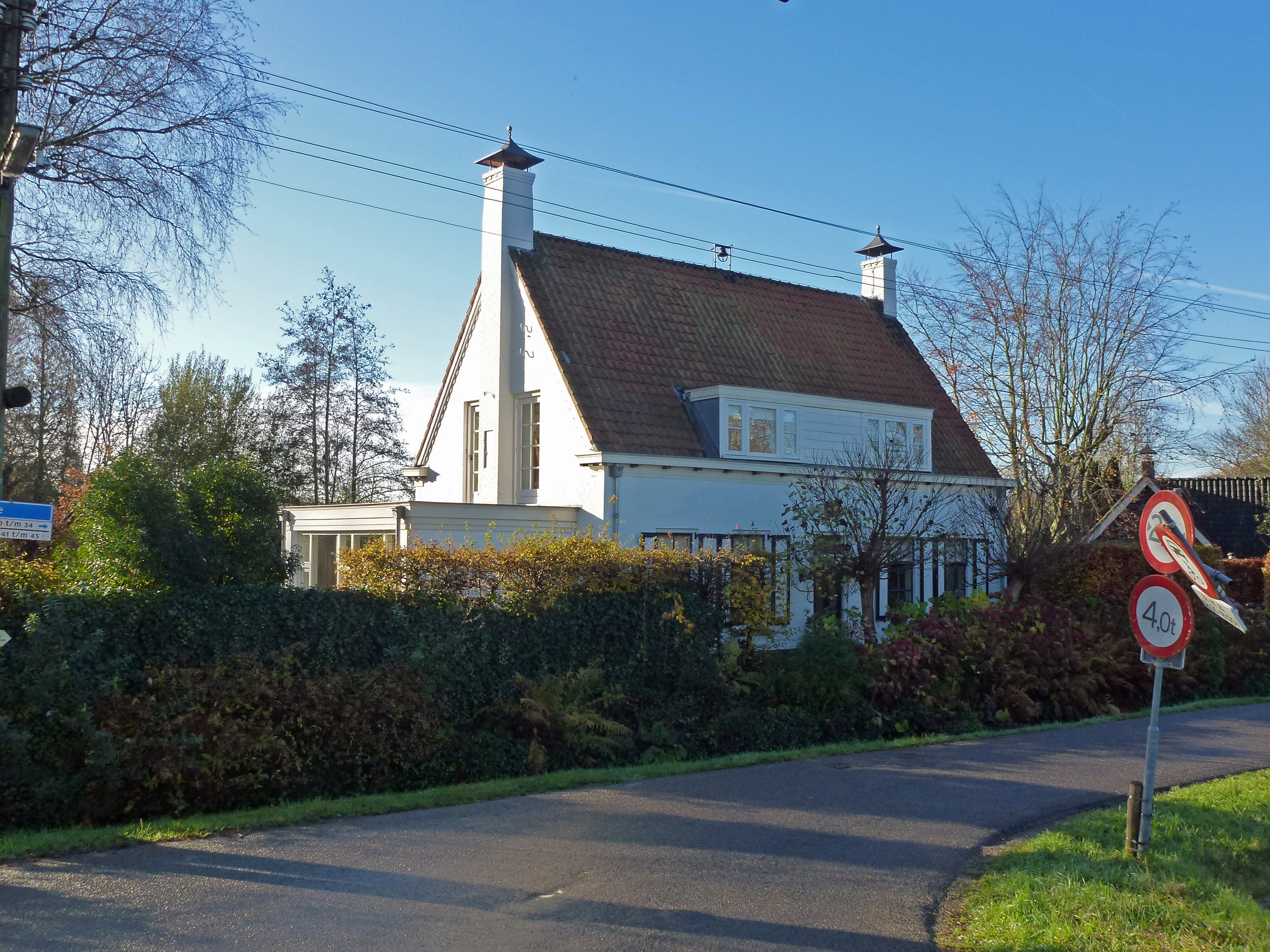
House in Sluipwijk
