= Platteweg =

- Hamlet
- Location in the province of South Holland in the Netherlands Location in the Netherlands
- Coordinates: 52°01′36″N 4°43′49″E
- Country: Netherlands
- Province: South Holland
- Municipality: Bodegraven-Reeuwijk

Population (2007)
  - Total: 200
- Time zone: UTC+1 (CET)
  - Summer (DST): UTC+2 (CEST)

Platteweg is a hamlet in the Dutch province of South Holland. It is a part of the former municipality of Reeuwijk, and lies about 2.3 km east of Gouda.

The statistical area "Platteweg", which also can include the surrounding countryside, has a population of around 180.
