= Tempel, Reeuwijk =

Tempel
- Hamlet
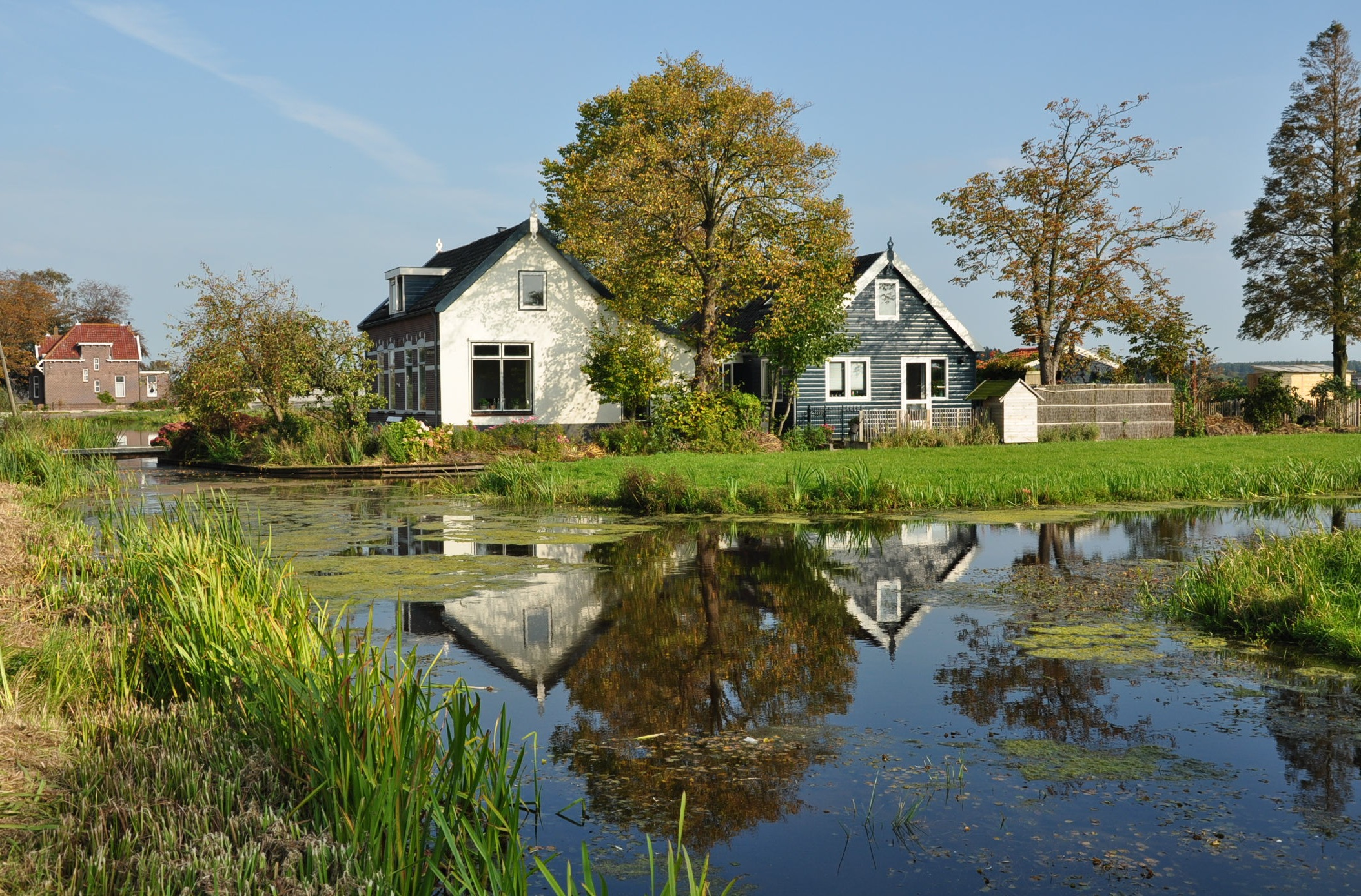
- Late summer in Tempel

- Location in the province of South Holland in the Netherlands Location in the Netherlands
- Coordinates: 52°03′59″N 4°42′28″E
- Country: Netherlands
- Province: South Holland
- Municipality: Bodegraven-Reeuwijk

Population (2007)
  - Total: 100
- Time zone: UTC+1 (CET)
  - Summer (DST): UTC+2 (CEST)

Tempel is a hamlet in the Dutch province of South Holland. It is a part of the former municipality of Reeuwijk, and lies about 6 km north of Gouda.

The statistical area "Tempel", which also can include the surrounding countryside, has a population of around 200.
