= Reeuwijk =

- Former municipality
- Flag Coat of arms

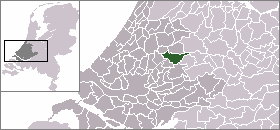
- Coordinates: 52.05°N 4.73°E
- Country: Netherlands
- Province: South Holland
- Municipality: Bodegraven-Reeuwijk

Area (2006)
  - Total: 50.11 km^{2} (19.35 sq mi)
  - Land: 38.22 km^{2} (14.76 sq mi)
  - Water: 11.89 km^{2} (4.59 sq mi)

Population (1 January 2007)
  - Total: 12,645
  - Density: 331/km^{2} (860/sq mi)
- Source: CBS, Statline.
- Time zone: UTC+1 (CET)
  - Summer (DST): UTC+2 (CEST)
- Website: www.reeuwijk.nl

Reeuwijk (Dutch pronunciation: [ˈreːuʋɛik]) is a former municipality in the western Netherlands, in the province of South Holland. The former municipality covers an area of 50.11 km^{2} (of which 11.89 km^{2} is water). Since January 1, 2011 Reeuwijk merged with Bodegraven to Bodegraven-Reeuwijk.

The former municipality of Reeuwijk includes the communities of Driebruggen, Hogebrug, Langeweide, Middelburg, Oud-Reeuwijk, Oukoop, Platteweg, Randenburg, Reeuwijk-Brug, Reeuwijk-Dorp, Sluipwijk, Tempel, Waarder and Westeinde.

== History ==
Reeuwijk was established as a good location for peat harvesting. The earliest known reference to the town is from 1248.

The area prospered in the 18th century when layers of peat were dug up, dried, and used as fuel for industries in Gouda. Eventually these peat quarries struck a fresh-water spring, forming the Reeuwijk Ponds (Reeuwijkse Plassen). Reeuwijk added neighboring municipalities: in 1855, Middelburg was added, in 1857, Oukoop, in 1870, Sluipwijk and Stein.

On January 1, 1989, when the municipality Driebruggen (formed in 1964) was dissolved, its communities Waarder and Driebruggen were added to Reeuwijk.

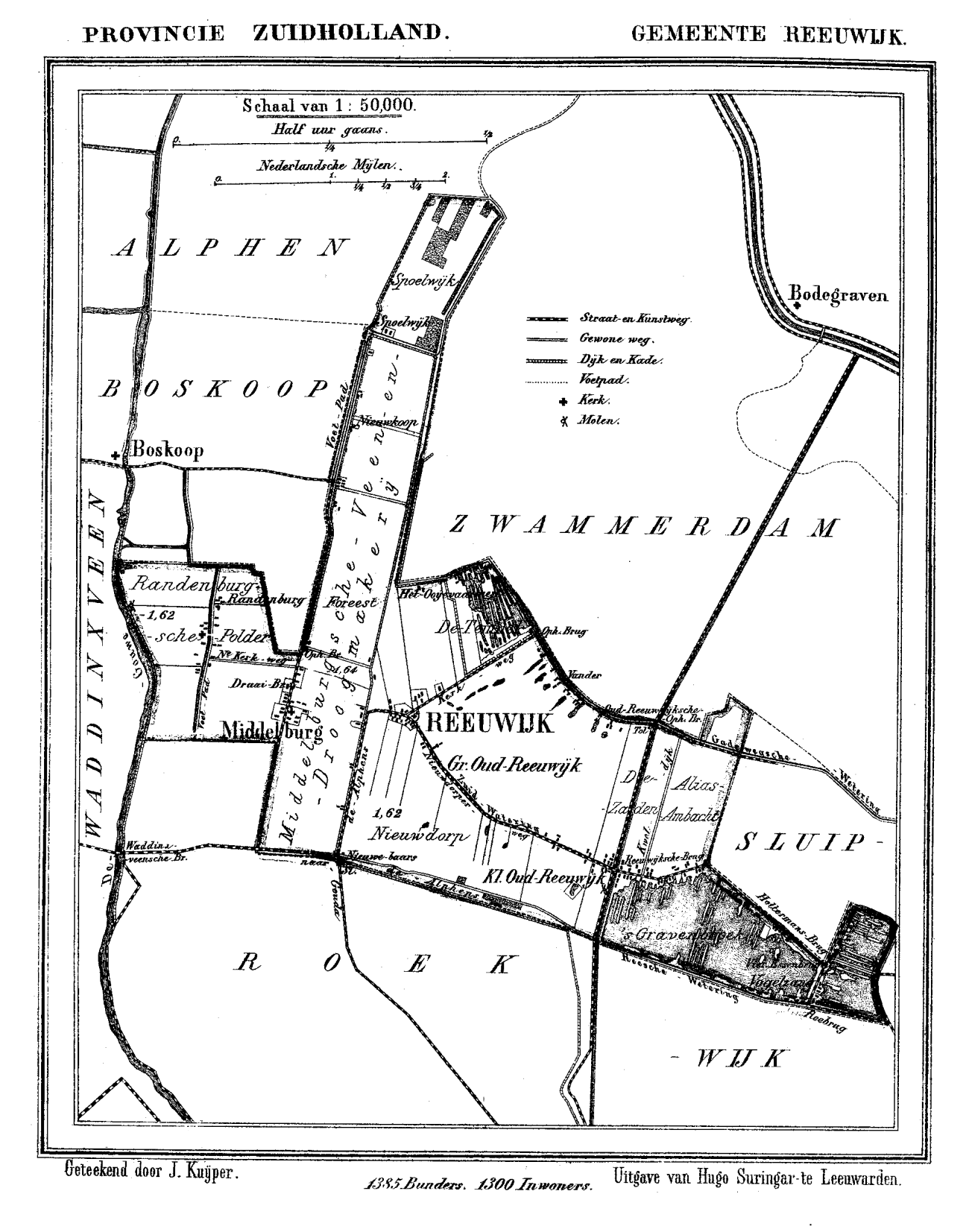
Reeuwijk in 1868.
