= Oukoop, South Holland =

Oukoop
- Hamlet
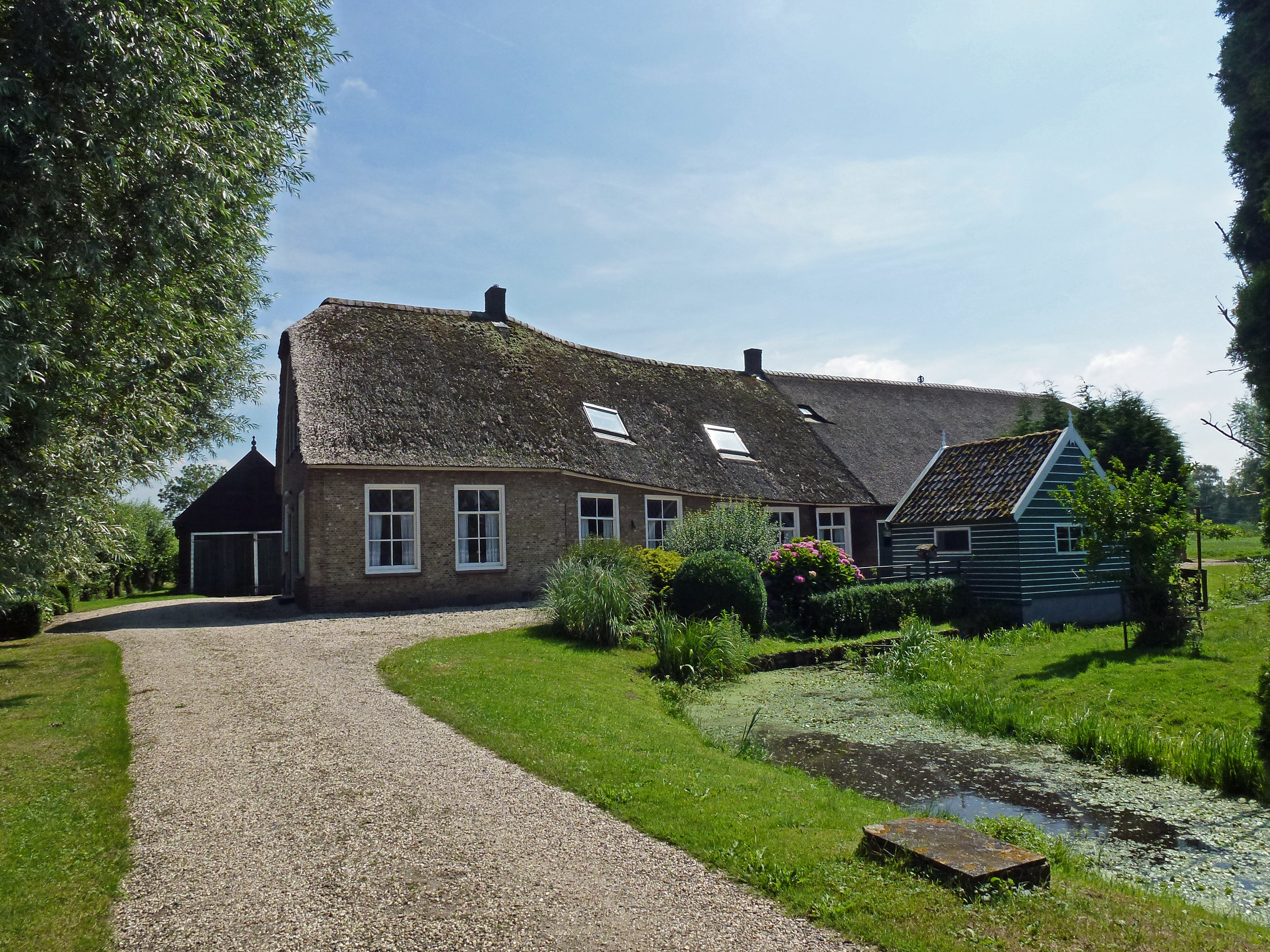
- Farm in Oukoop
- Interactive map of Oukoop
- Coordinates: 52°02′02″N 4°46′23″E
- Country: Netherlands
- Province: South Holland
- Municipality: Bodegraven-Reeuwijk

Population (2007)
  - Total: 60
- Time zone: UTC+1 (CET)
  - Summer (DST): UTC+2 (CEST)

Oukoop is a hamlet in the Dutch province of South Holland. It is a part of the former municipality of Reeuwijk, and lies about 4 km east of Gouda.

The statistical area "Oukoop", which also can include the surrounding countryside, has a population of around 60.

Oukoop was a separate municipality between 1818 and 1857, when it merged with Hekendorp.
