= Ria van Velsen (gymnast) =

Dutch gymnast

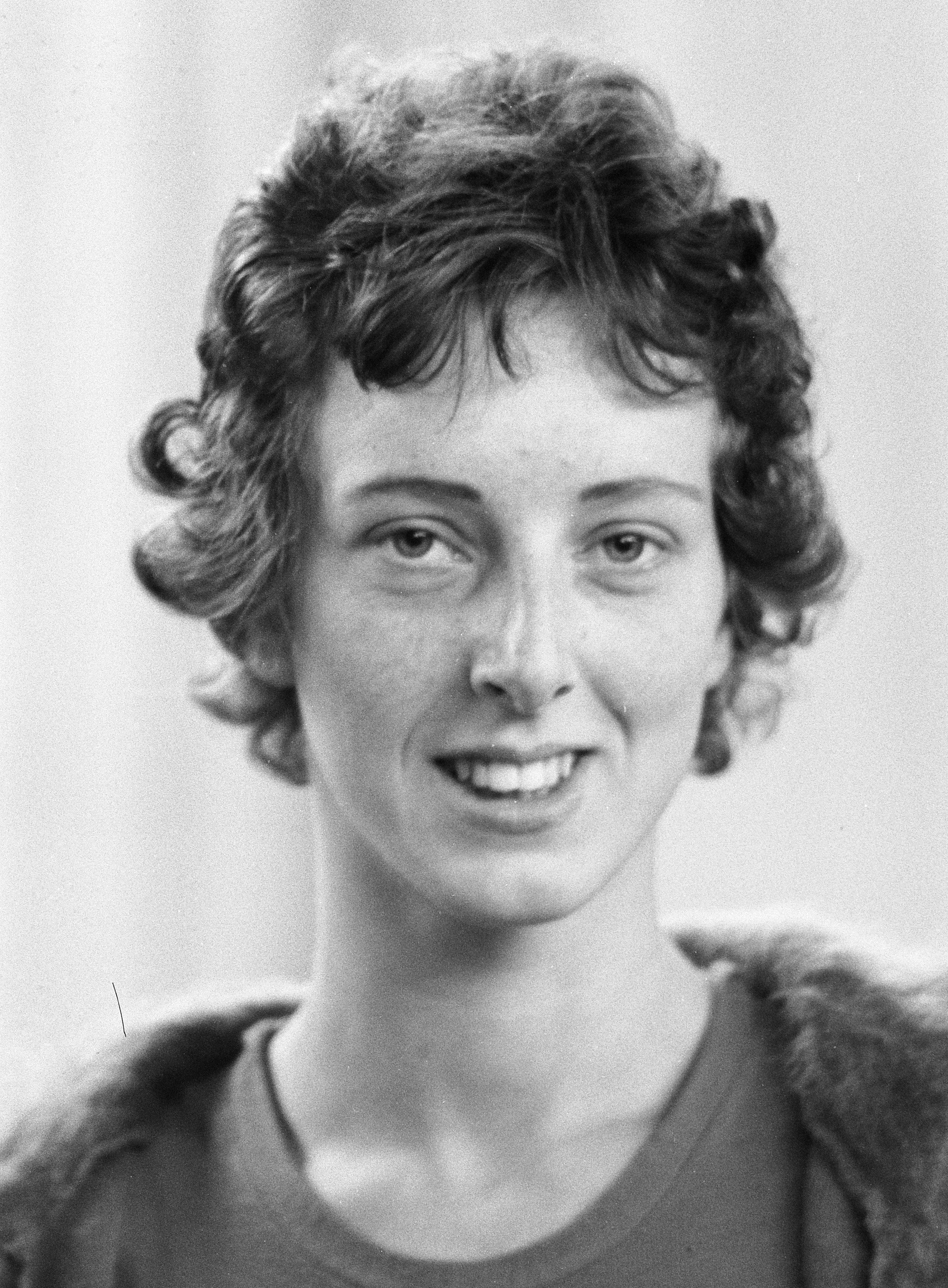
- Ria van Velsen in 1960

Personal information
- Born: 18 May 1939 (age 87) Bodegraven, the Netherlands
- Height: 1.68 m (5 ft 6 in)
- Weight: 56 kg (123 lb)

Sport
- Sport: Artistic gymnastics
- Club: GV Bodegraven

Maria Teuntje "Ria" van Velsen (born 18 May 1939) is a retired Dutch artistic gymnast who participated in the 1960 Summer Olympics. She took part in all events, with the best achievement of 14th place in the team all-around competitions. She is not related to the Dutch swimmer Ria van Velsen who also competed at the 1960 Games. After marriage to Thijs Rietveld in 1961 she was often credited as Ria Rietveld.

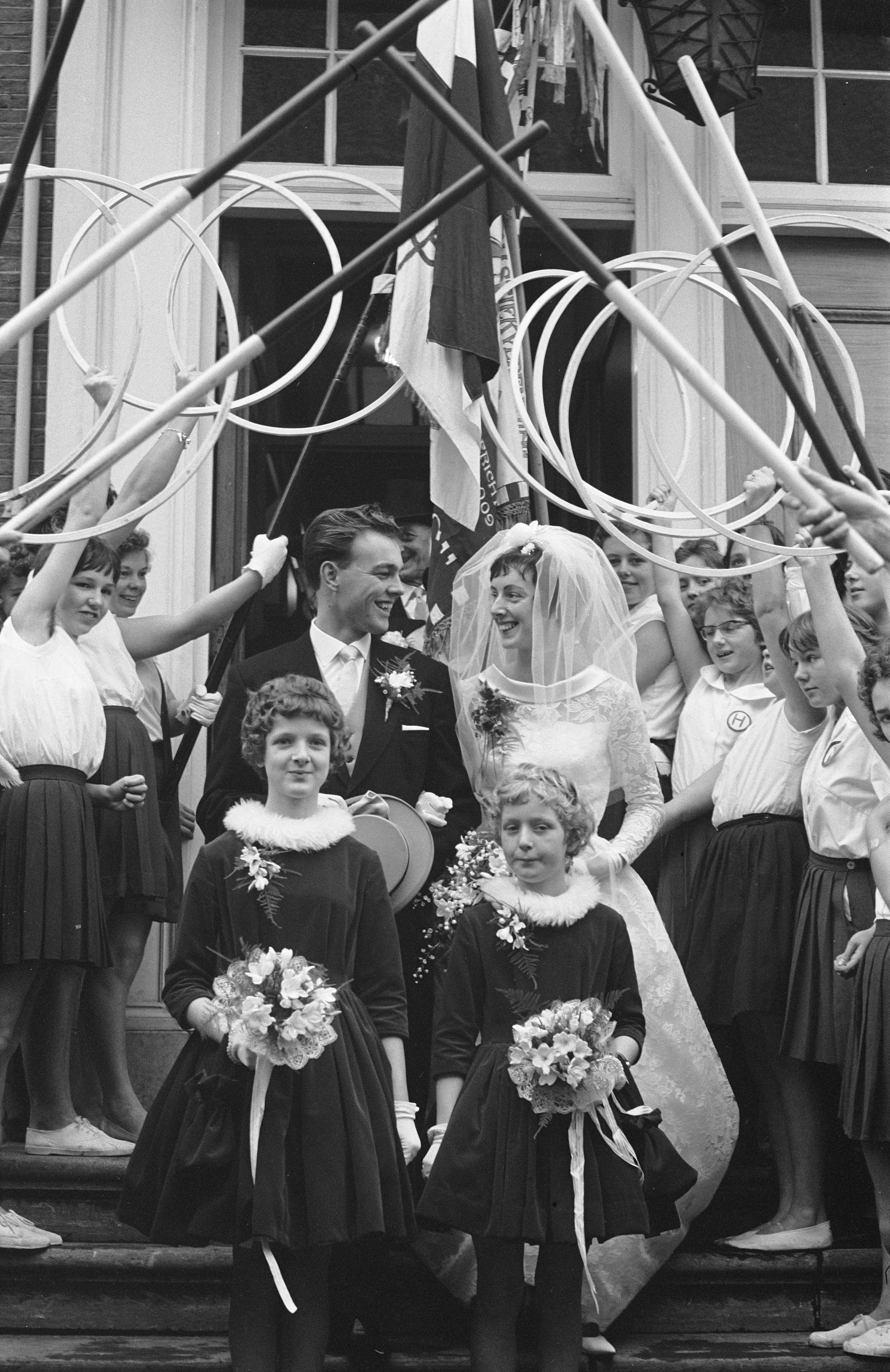
Ria van Velsen and Thijs Rietveld are getting married on 14 December 1961
