= Waarder =

- Village
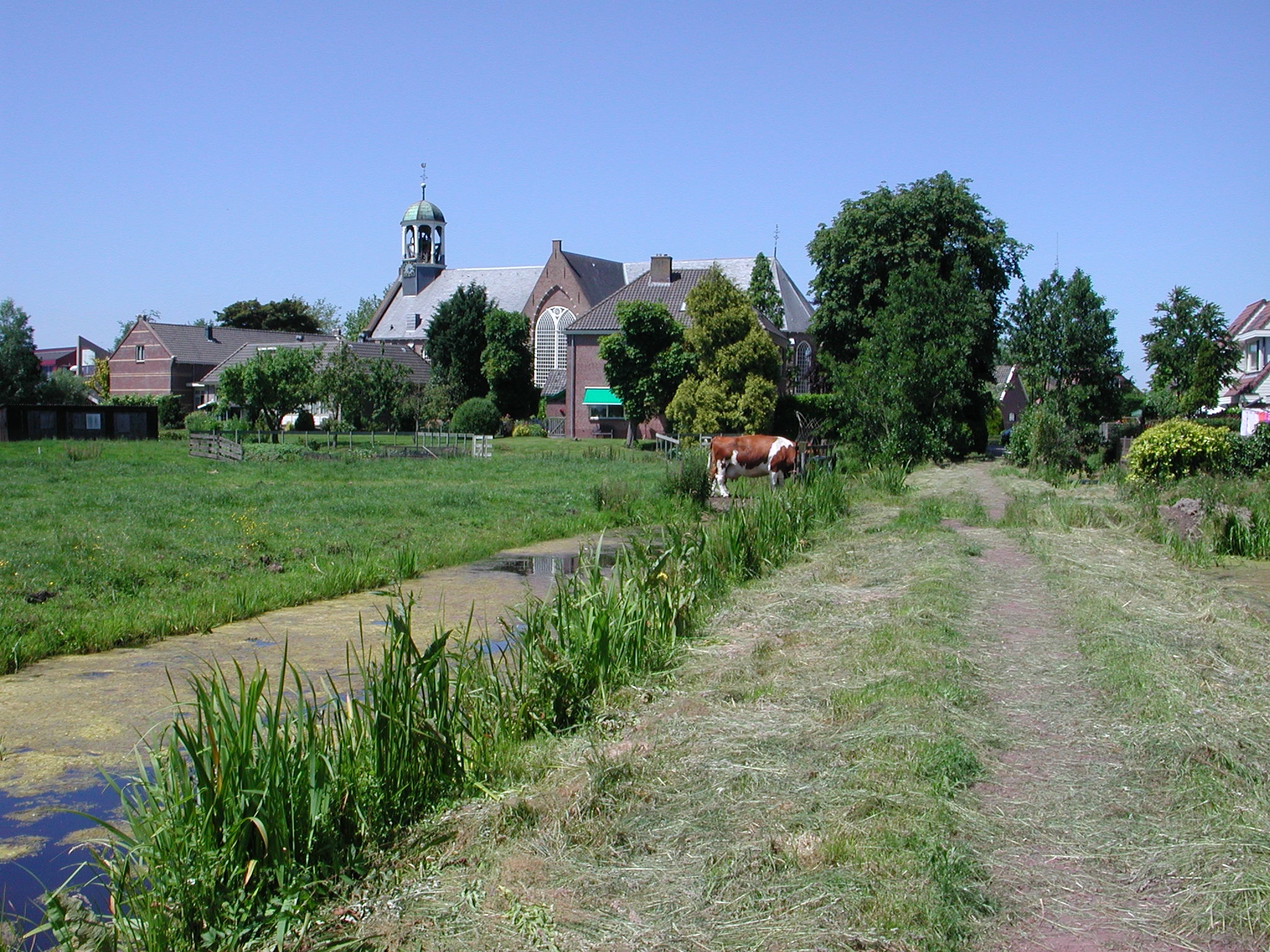
- Waarder with the church and the medieval Kerkelaantje

- Location in the province of South Holland in the Netherlands Location in the Netherlands
- Coordinates: 52°3′41″N 4°49′21″E
- Country: Netherlands
- Province: South Holland
- Municipality: Bodegraven-Reeuwijk

Area
  - Total: 8.56 km^{2} (3.31 sq mi)
- Elevation: −1.6 m (−5.2 ft)

Population (2021)
  - Total: 1,660
  - Density: 194/km^{2} (502/sq mi)
- Time zone: UTC+1 (CET)
  - Summer (DST): UTC+2 (CEST)
- Postal code: 3466
- Dialing code: 0348

Waarder is a village in the Dutch province of South Holland. It is a part of the former municipality of Reeuwijk, and lies about 5 km southwest of Woerden.

The village was first mentioned in 1108 as Werdere and means "(river) island". Waarder developed as a road on a silted river arm in the 12th century. The Dutch Reformed church is a single aisled cruciform church from the 16th century.

Waarder was a separate municipality until 1964, when it became part of Driebruggen, which became part of Reeuwijk in 1989. Since 2011 it is part of the municipality of Bodegraven-Reeuwijk.

== Gallery ==
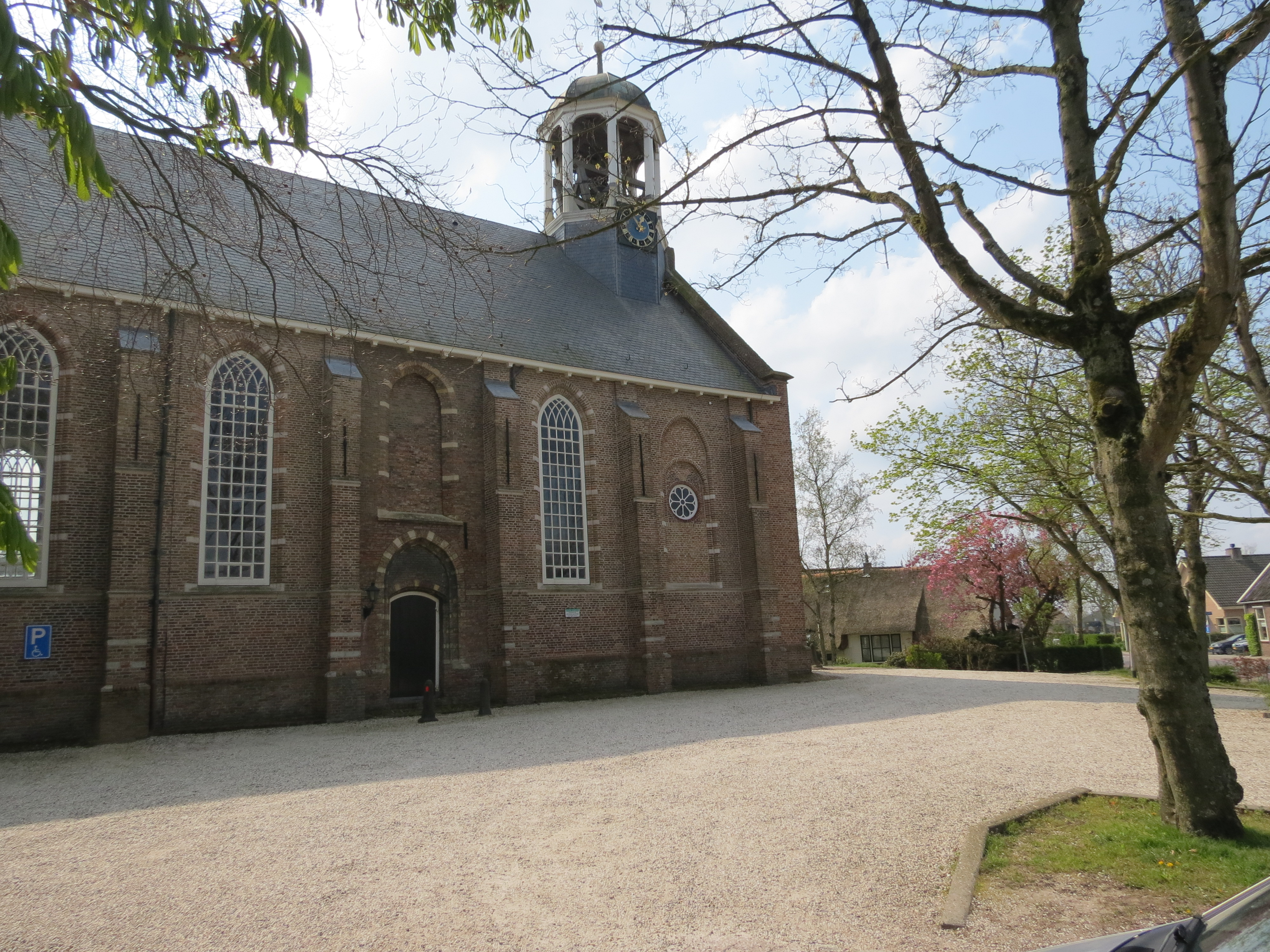
Dutch Reformed church

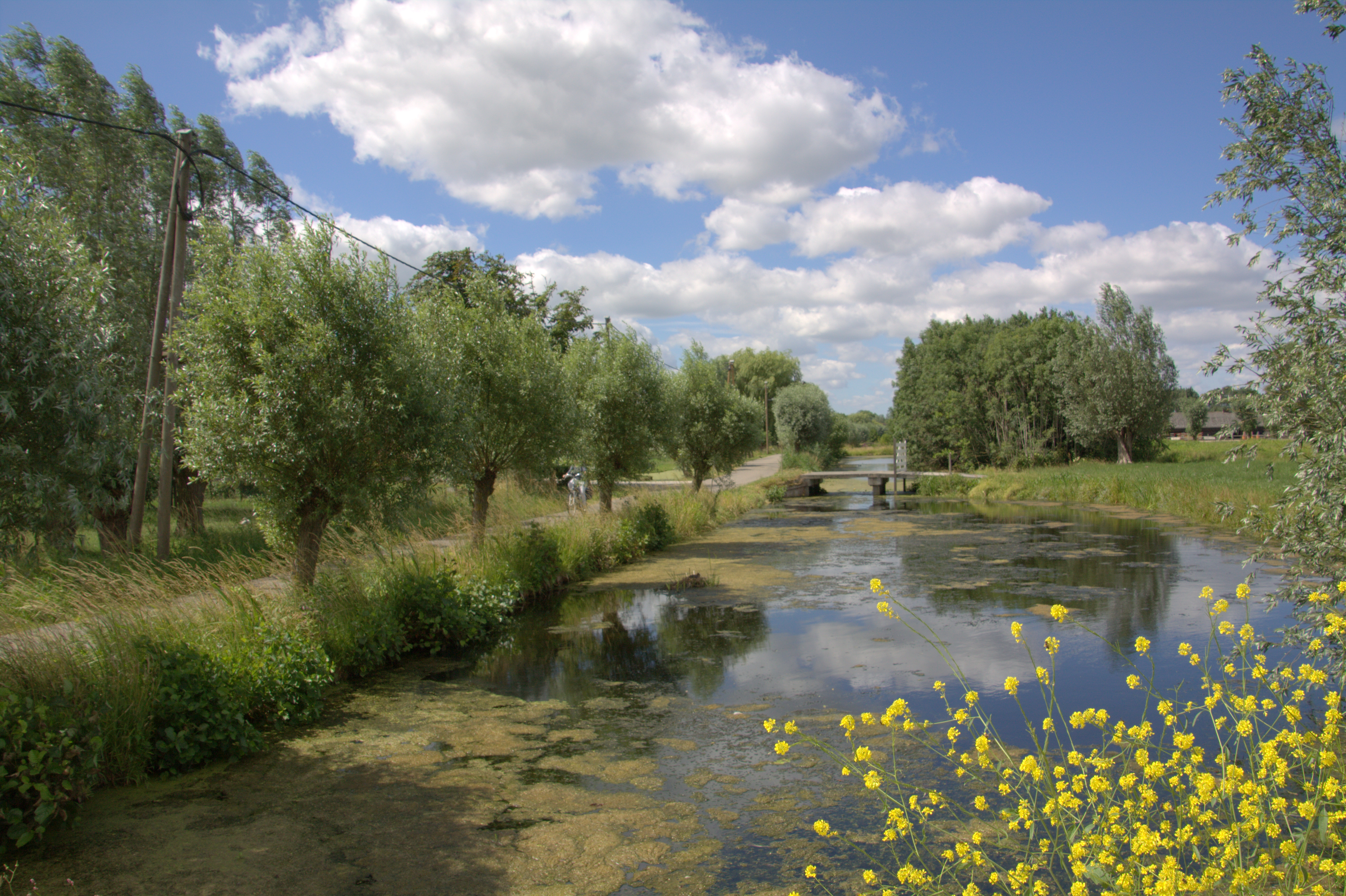
Nature near Waarder
