= Hekendorp =

- Village
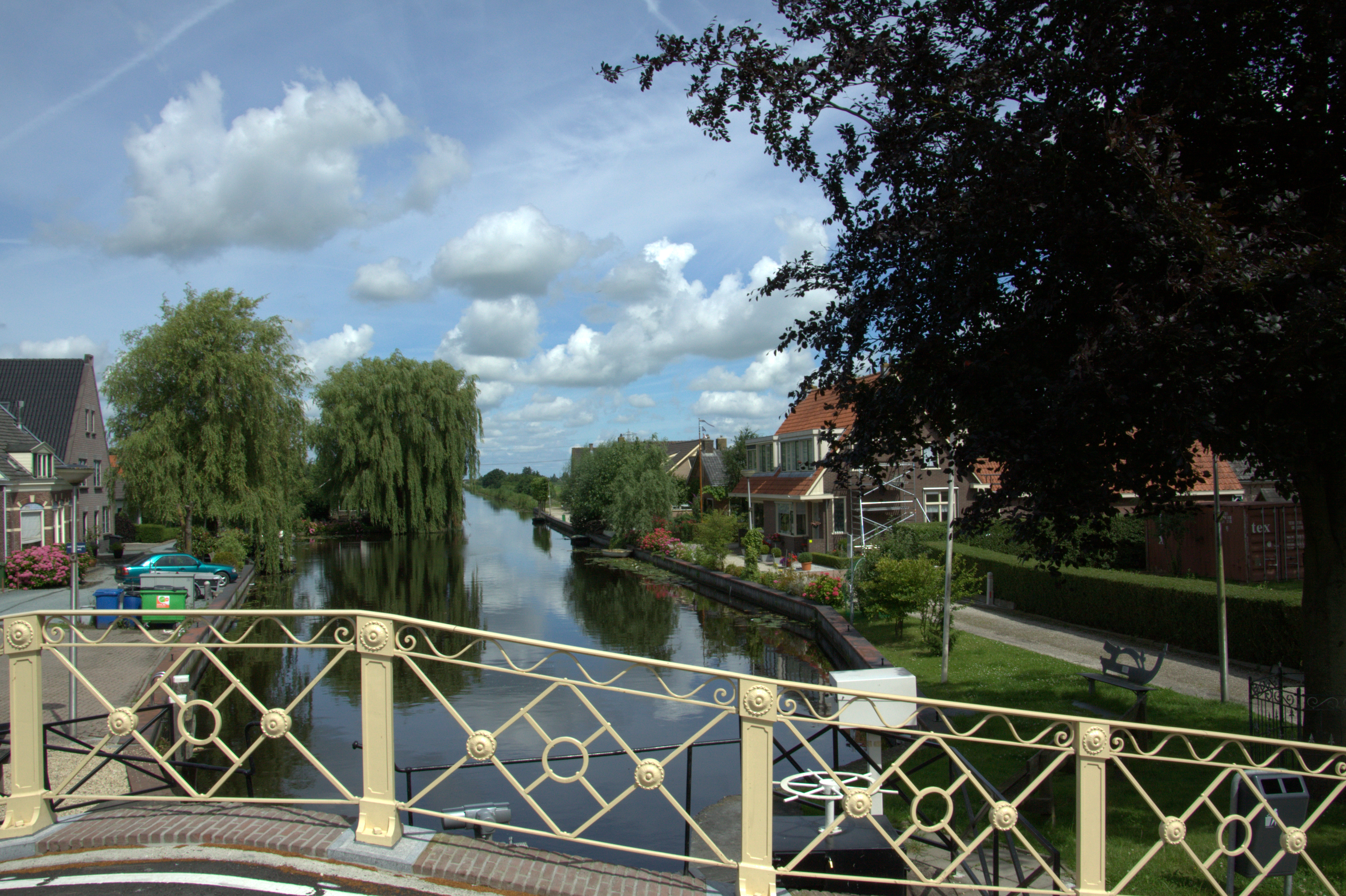
- View on the canal

- Location in the Netherlands Hekendorp (Netherlands)
- Coordinates: 52°0′55″N 4°48′33″E
- Country: Netherlands
- Province: Utrecht
- Municipality: Oudewater

Area
  - Total: 0.21 km^{2} (0.081 sq mi)
- Elevation: 3 m (9.8 ft)

Population (2021)
  - Total: 1,540
  - Density: 7,300/km^{2} (19,000/sq mi)
- Time zone: UTC+1 (CET)
  - Summer (DST): UTC+2 (CEST)
- Postal code: 3421
- Dialing code: 0348

Hekendorp is a village in the Dutch province of Utrecht. It is a part of the municipality of Oudewater, and lies about 6 km east of Gouda.

Hekendorp was a separate municipality between 1817 and 1964, when it merged with Driebruggen. During this period, the area was part of the province South Holland. In 1857, the municipality of Oukoop was added to Hekendorp, even though the two former municipalities did not border each other.

The Goejanverwellesluis where the patriots stopped Wilhelmina van Pruisen is located in Hekendorp.

== History ==
The village was first mentioned in 1307 as Hedickendorp, and means "settlement of Hedeke (person)". Hekendorp developed as a dike village near the sluice where the Dubbele Wiericke enters the Hollandse IJssel. In 1845, a little Dutch Reformed Church was built in the village. The Goejanverwellesluis dates from 1607, and is still operated manually. There is a justice statue near the sluice where criminals were publicly tortured. In 1840, Hekendorp was home to 408 people.

== Gallery ==
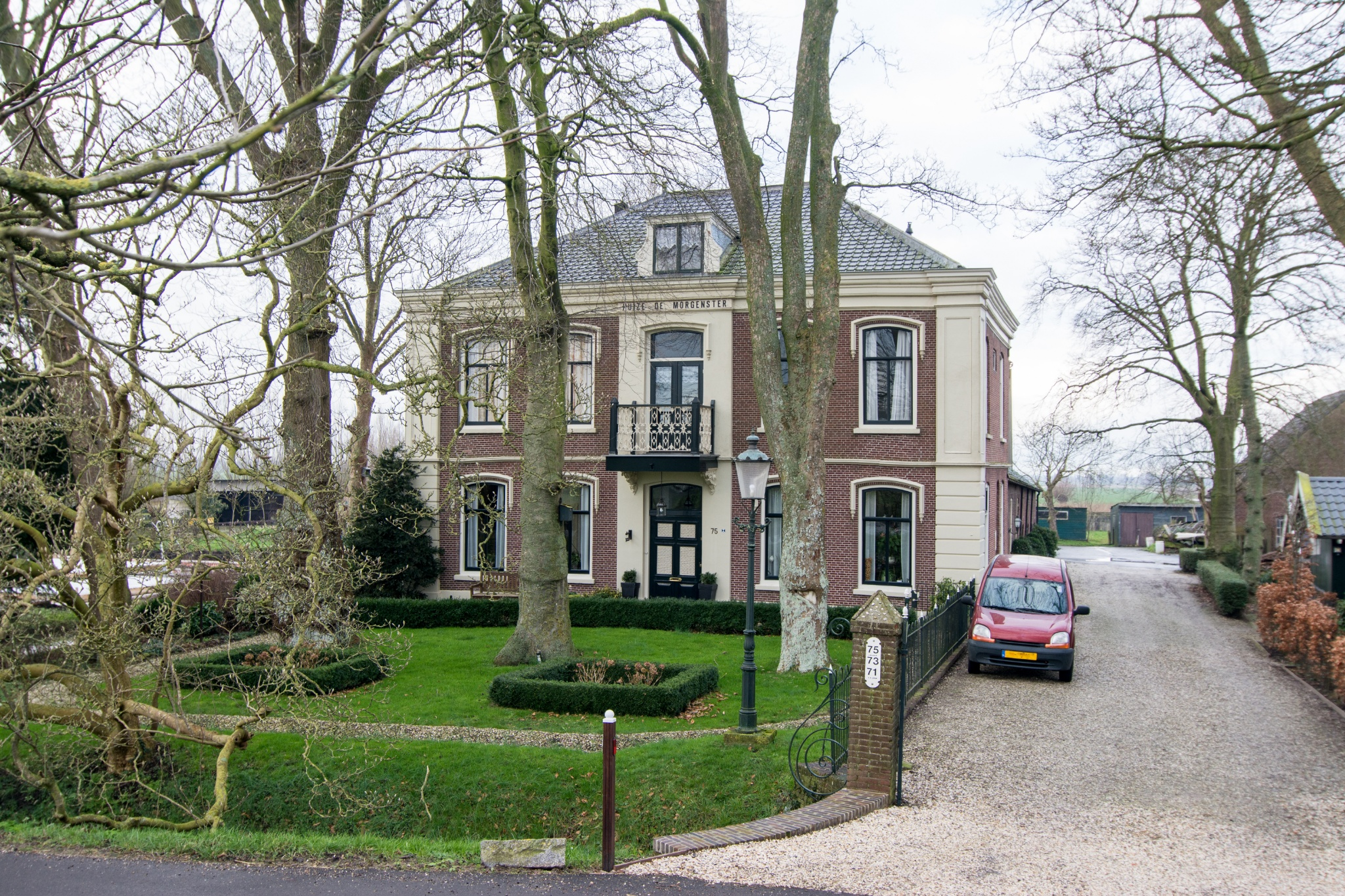
Huize de Morgenster

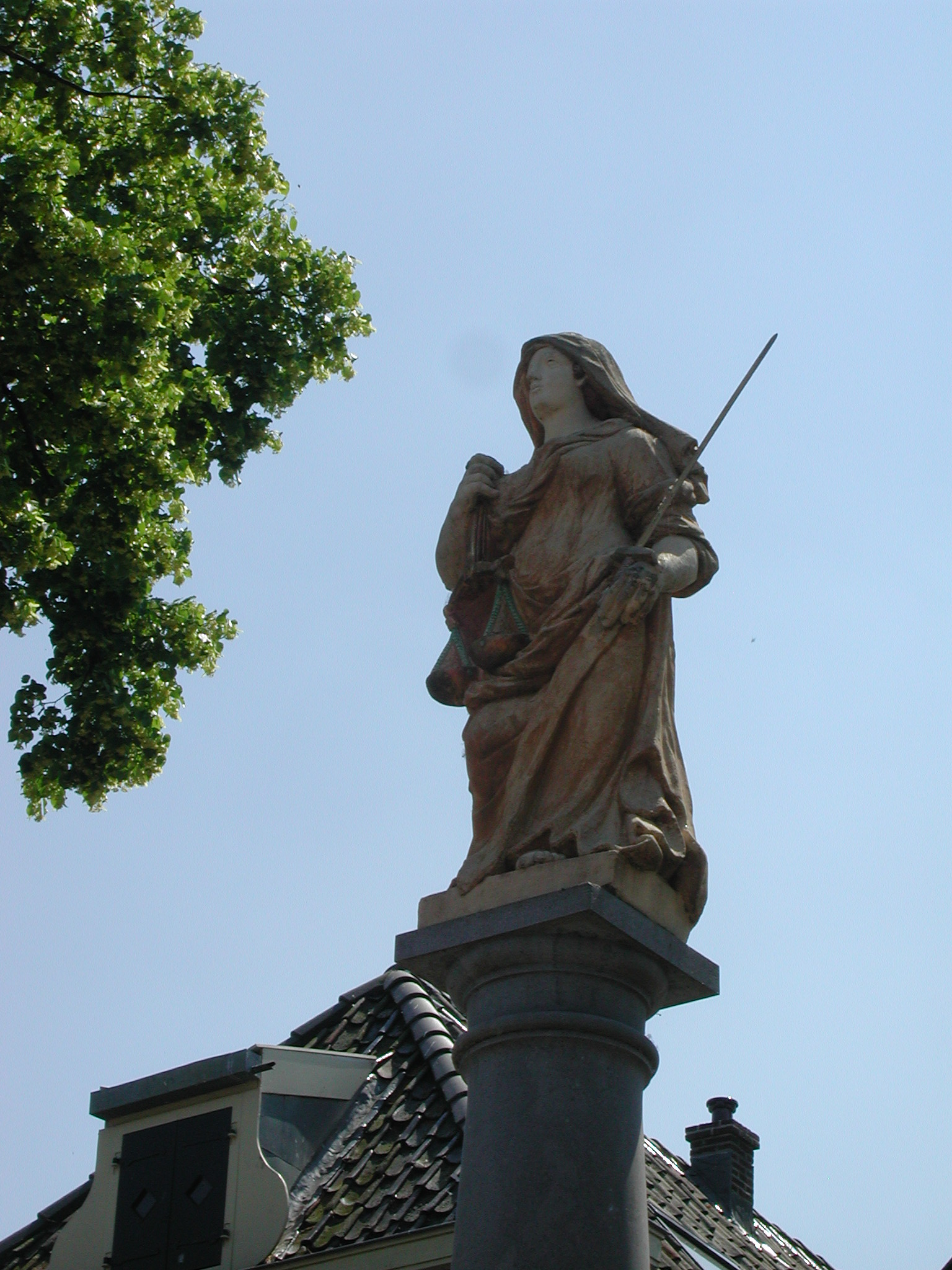
Lady Justice in Hekendorp

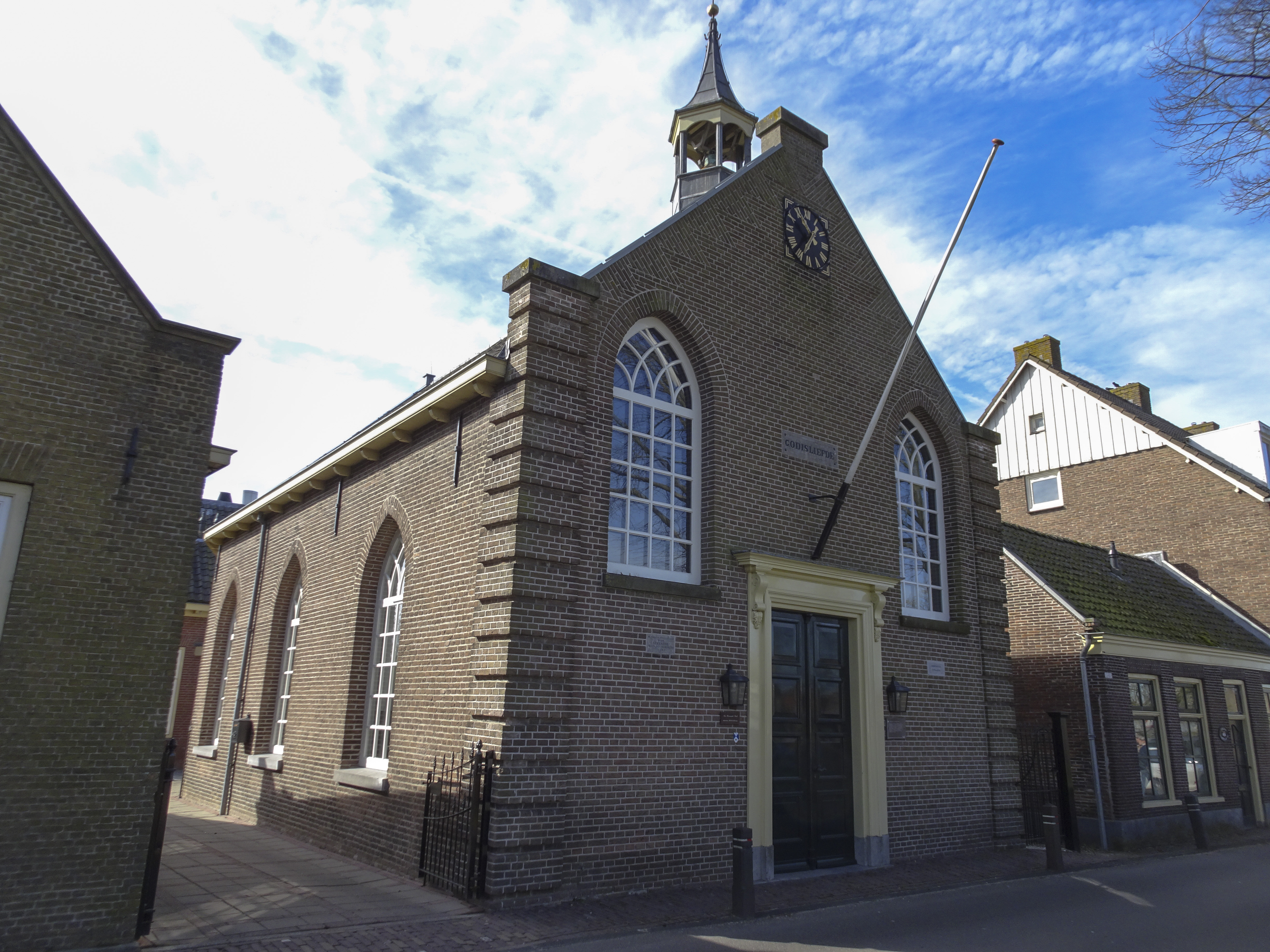
Church of Hekendorp

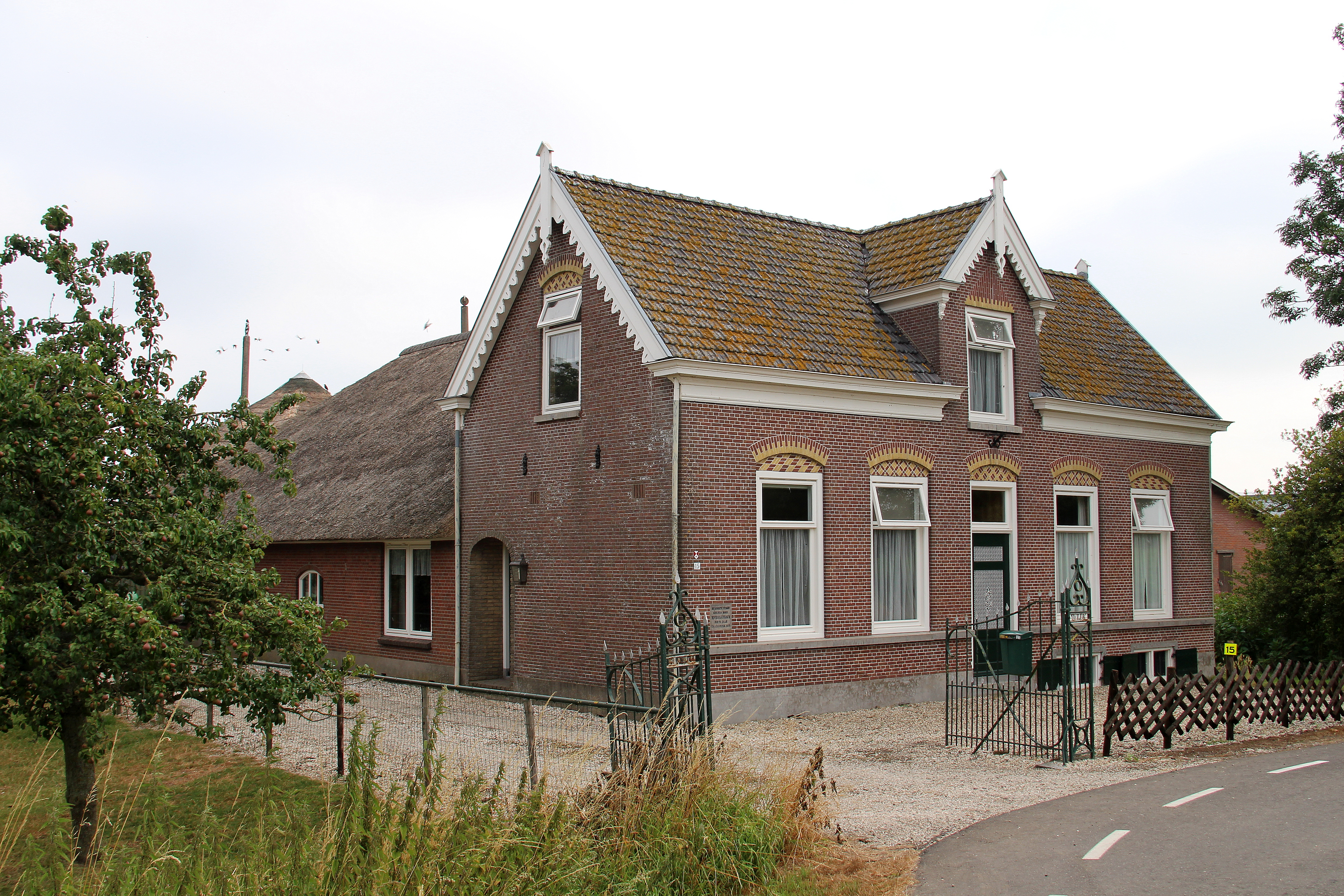
Farm in Hekendorp
