= Langeweide =

- Hamlet
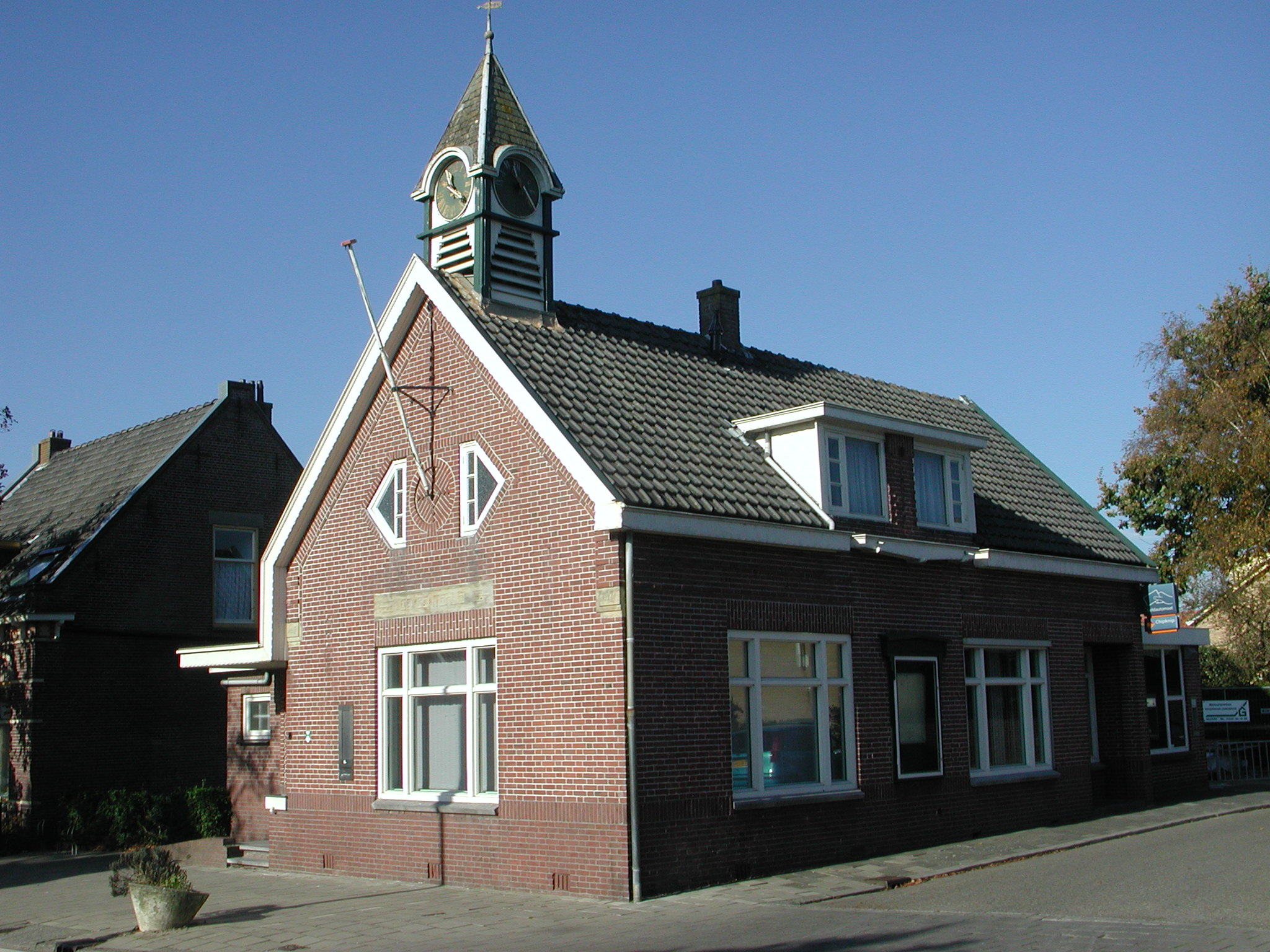
- Former town hall

- Location in the province of South Holland in the Netherlands Location in the Netherlands
- Coordinates: 52°01′56″N 4°47′58″E
- Country: Netherlands
- Province: South Holland
- Municipality: Bodegraven-Reeuwijk

Population (2007)
  - Total: 100
- Time zone: UTC+1 (CET)
  - Summer (DST): UTC+2 (CEST)

Langeweide is a hamlet in the Dutch province of South Holland. It is a part of the former municipality of Reeuwijk, and lies about 6 km east of Gouda.
