= Alkemade =

- Former municipality
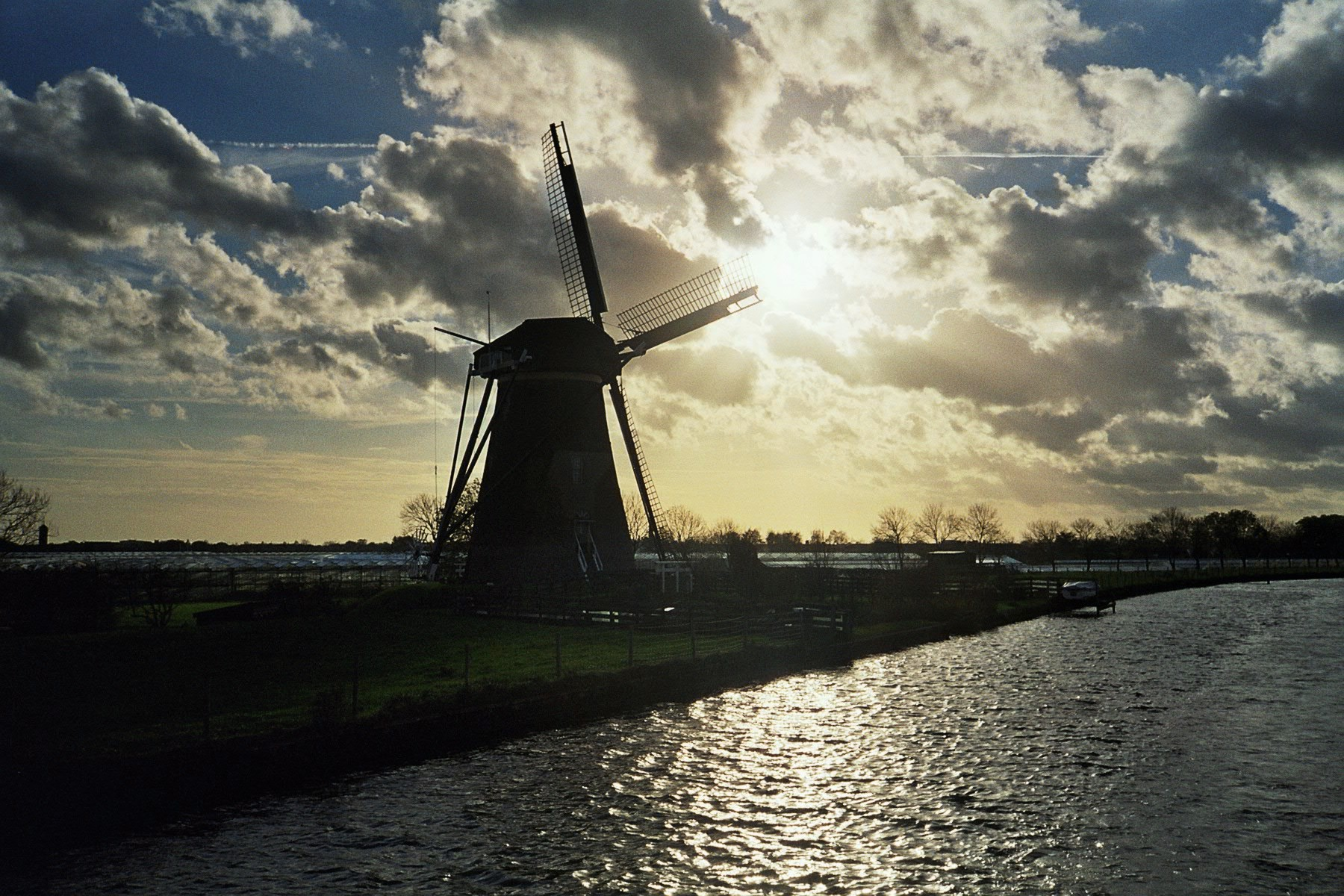

- Flag Coat of arms

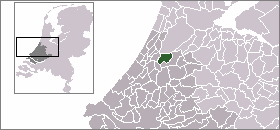
- Coordinates: 52.20°N 4.58°E
- Country: Netherlands
- Province: South Holland
- Municipality: Kaag en Braassem

Area (2006)
  - Total: 30.91 km^{2} (11.93 sq mi)
  - Land: 26.97 km^{2} (10.41 sq mi)
  - Water: 3.93 km^{2} (1.52 sq mi)

Population (1 January 2007)
  - Total: 14,535
  - Density: 539/km^{2} (1,400/sq mi)
- Source: CBS, Statline.
- Time zone: UTC+1 (CET)
  - Summer (DST): UTC+2 (CEST)
- Website: www.gemeentealkemade.nl

Alkemade (Dutch pronunciation: [ˌɑlkəˈmaːdə]) is a former municipality in the western Netherlands, in the province of South Holland. Before its merger with Jacobswoude, the municipality covered an area of 30.91 km^{2} (11.93 sq mi) of which 3.94 km^{2} (1.52 sq mi) is water. It had a population of 14,481 in 2004.

The municipality of Alkemade comprised the communities of Kaag, Nieuwe Wetering, Oud Ade, Oude Wetering, Rijpwetering, and Roelofarendsveen. There is no settlement called Alkemade itself.

The municipality has many greenhouses and 13 windmills, one of which dates from 1632. Water sports are popular here because of its location on the lakes Kagerplassen and Braassemermeer.

On January 1, 2009, Alkemade and Jacobswoude merged and formed the new municipality of Kaag en Braassem.

== Notable people ==
- Joop Doderer (1921–2005) - actor
- Joop Zoetemelk (1946) - cyclist, winner of the Tour de France 1980
- Lou Geels (1908–1979) - actor
- Bart Spring in 't Veld (1976) - Big Brother 2000 winner
- Alex Turk (1975) - cartoonist
- Sanne van der Star (1986) - speed skater
- Monique Velzeboer (1971) - speed skater, gold medal at the 1988 Olympics
- Simone Velzeboer - speed skater
- Lars Hoogenboom - marathon skater
- Femke Heemskerk - swimmer
- Ilana Rooderkerk (1987) - soap opera actress
- Marike Koek (1953) - actress
- Bobbie Koek (1985) - actress
- Dioomen - D.J.

== See also ==
- Vrije en Lage Boekhorst
