= Raad voor plantenrassen =

Dutch public body

- Formation: 2006 (continuation of Raad voor het Kwekersrecht)
- Location: Roelofarendsveen
- President (Dutch: voorzitter): H.A. Harmsma

The Board for plant varieties (Dutch: Raad voor plantenrassen) is a Dutch public body, which is responsible for the grant and administration of the Dutch plant variety right (Dutch: kwekersrecht).
