= Naktuinbouw =

Dutch research institute

Naktuinbouw (the Netherlands Inspection Service for Horticulture) is a Dutch centre in Roelofarendsveen with a primary focus based upon propagating material used in the horticultural sector. Naktuinbouw acts as a quality inspection service and as a research institute that performs research into varieties, pests and diseases.
