= Jacobswoude =

- Municipality
- Flag Coat of arms

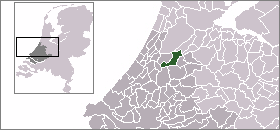
- Coordinates: 52.20°N 4.65°E
- Country: Netherlands
- Province: South Holland
- Municipality: Kaag en Braassem

Area (2006)
  - Total: 41.37 km^{2} (15.97 sq mi)
  - Land: 36.50 km^{2} (14.09 sq mi)
  - Water: 4.87 km^{2} (1.88 sq mi)

Population (1 January 2007)
  - Total: 10,685
  - Density: 293/km^{2} (760/sq mi)
- Source: CBS, Statline.
- Time zone: UTC+1 (CET)
  - Summer (DST): UTC+2 (CEST)
- Website: www.jacobswoude-zh.nl/

Jacobswoude (Dutch pronunciation: [ˈjaːkɔpsˌʋʌudə]) is a former municipality in the western Netherlands, in the province of South Holland, now part of municipality Kaag en Braassem. Before the merger with Alkemade, the municipality covered an area of 41.37 km^{2} (15.97 sq mi) of which 4.88 km^{2} (1.88 sq mi) is water, mainly the lakes Braassemermeer and Wijde Aa. It consisted of the communities Bilderdam, Hoogmade, Leimuiden, Rijnsaterwoude, and Woubrugge, all located around the above-mentioned lakes. It had a population of 10,692 on 1 January 2004.

Jacobswoude is located in the center of the Groene Hart (Green Heart), the slightly less densely populated center area of the Randstad. Inhabitants of Jacobswoude depend on Alphen aan den Rijn, Leiden and Amsterdam for facilities not offered in the smaller villages. Most of its inhabitants commute daily to one of the larger cities in the region for work.

Jacobswoude was created on 1 January 1991 by merging the municipalities of Leimuiden, Rijnsaterwoude and Woubrugge. On 1 January 2009, Jacobswoude merged with Alkemade and formed the new municipality of Kaag en Braassem.

The municipality was named after the lost village of Jacobswoude that was located within the former municipal boundaries. The first mention of this village is from 823, when it is thought that Lord Jacob van den Woude was granted the area as a fiefdom from Louis the Pious. The peat surrounding the village was excavated, making Jacobswoude an island by the middle of the 18th century. This caused the village to deteriorate and its population moved to Woubrugge. Only a monument on the site of the original village remains.

Wireless Jacobswoude is a wireless community network under construction, starting in Woubrugge, connected to Wireless Leiden.

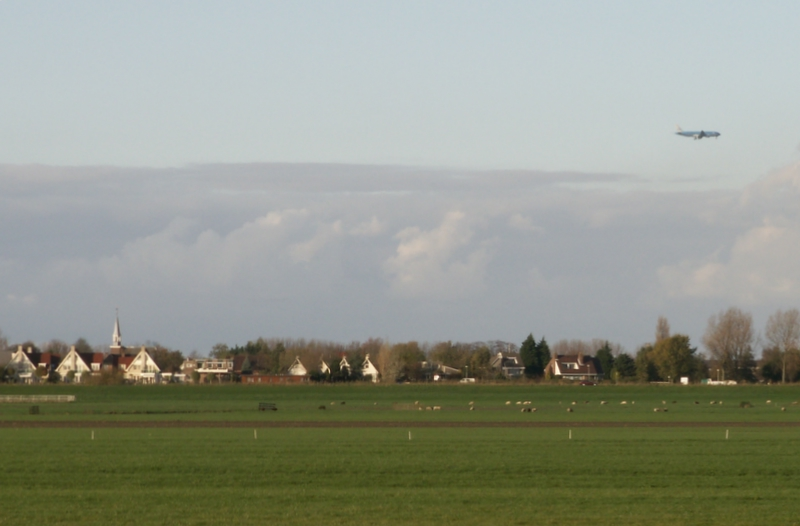
Leimuiden as seen from the south.

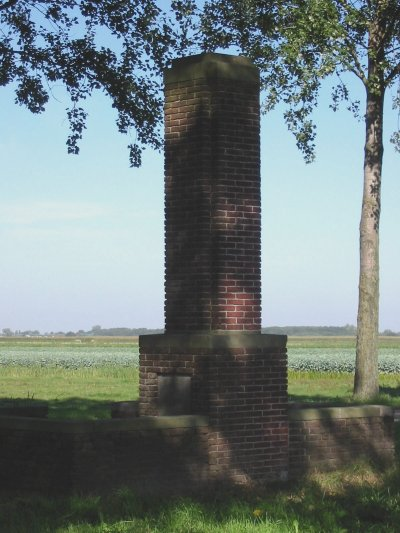
Monument to the lost village of Jacobswoude.

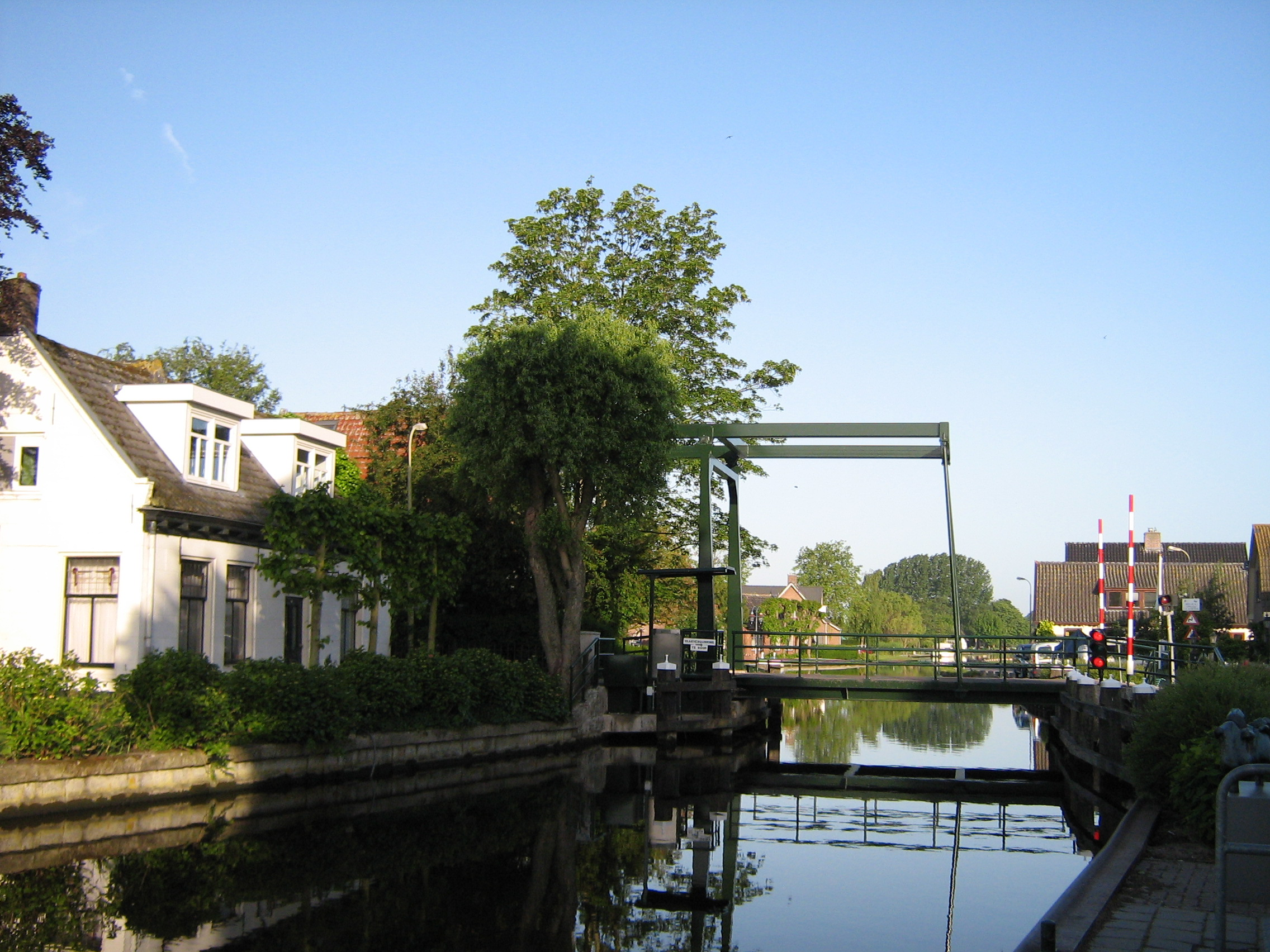
Bilderdam.
