= Vrije en Lage Boekhorst =

Coordinates: 52°11′45″N 4°33′0″E

Vrije en Lage Boekhorst ("Free and Low Boekhorst") is a former municipality in the Dutch province of South Holland. It was located to the west of the hamlet of Zevenhuizen in the former municipality of Alkemade.

The municipality existed between 1817 and 1855, when it became part of Alkemade. The area used to be a separate manor, but it was added in 1812 to the municipality of Noordwijkerhout as an exclave, even though that village lay almost 10 km away. Presumably this happened because the area was confused with Hooge Boekhorst ("High Boekhorst") near Noordwijkerhout. The municipality had an area of only about 0.35 km^{2} and about 60 inhabitants.
