= Kaag en Braassem =

- Municipality
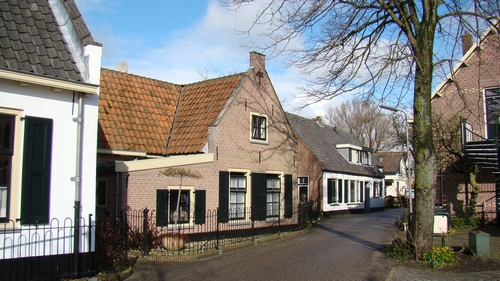
- Island of Kaag

- Flag Coat of arms

- Location in South Holland
- Coordinates: 52°12′N 4°38′E
- Country: Netherlands
- Province: South Holland
- Established: 1 January 2009

Government
  - Body: Municipal council
  - Mayor: Marina van der Velde-Menting (VVD)

Area
  - Total: 72.24 km^{2} (27.89 sq mi)
  - Land: 63.24 km^{2} (24.42 sq mi)
  - Water: 9.00 km^{2} (3.47 sq mi)
- Elevation: −1 m (−3.3 ft)

Population (January 2021)
  - Total: 27,541
  - Density: 435/km^{2} (1,130/sq mi)
- Time zone: UTC+1 (CET)
  - Summer (DST): UTC+2 (CEST)
- Postcode: 2355, 2370–2377, 2450–2451, 2465, 2480–2481
- Area code: 0172, 071
- Website: www.kaagenbraassem.nl

Kaag en Braassem (Dutch pronunciation: [ˌkaːx ʔɛn ˈbraːsəm]) is a municipality in the western Netherlands, in the province of South Holland. It was formed on 1 January 2009, through the merger of Alkemade and Jacobswoude.

Kaag en Braassem consists of 10 towns:

- Hoogmade
- Kaag
- Leimuiden
- Nieuwe Wetering
- Oud-Ade
- Oude Wetering
- Rijnsaterwoude
- Rijpwetering
- Roelofarendsveen
- Woubrugge

In addition, there are 5 hamlets:

- Bilderdam
- Heimansbuurt
- Ofwegen
- Vriezekoop
- Zevenhuizen

== Topography ==
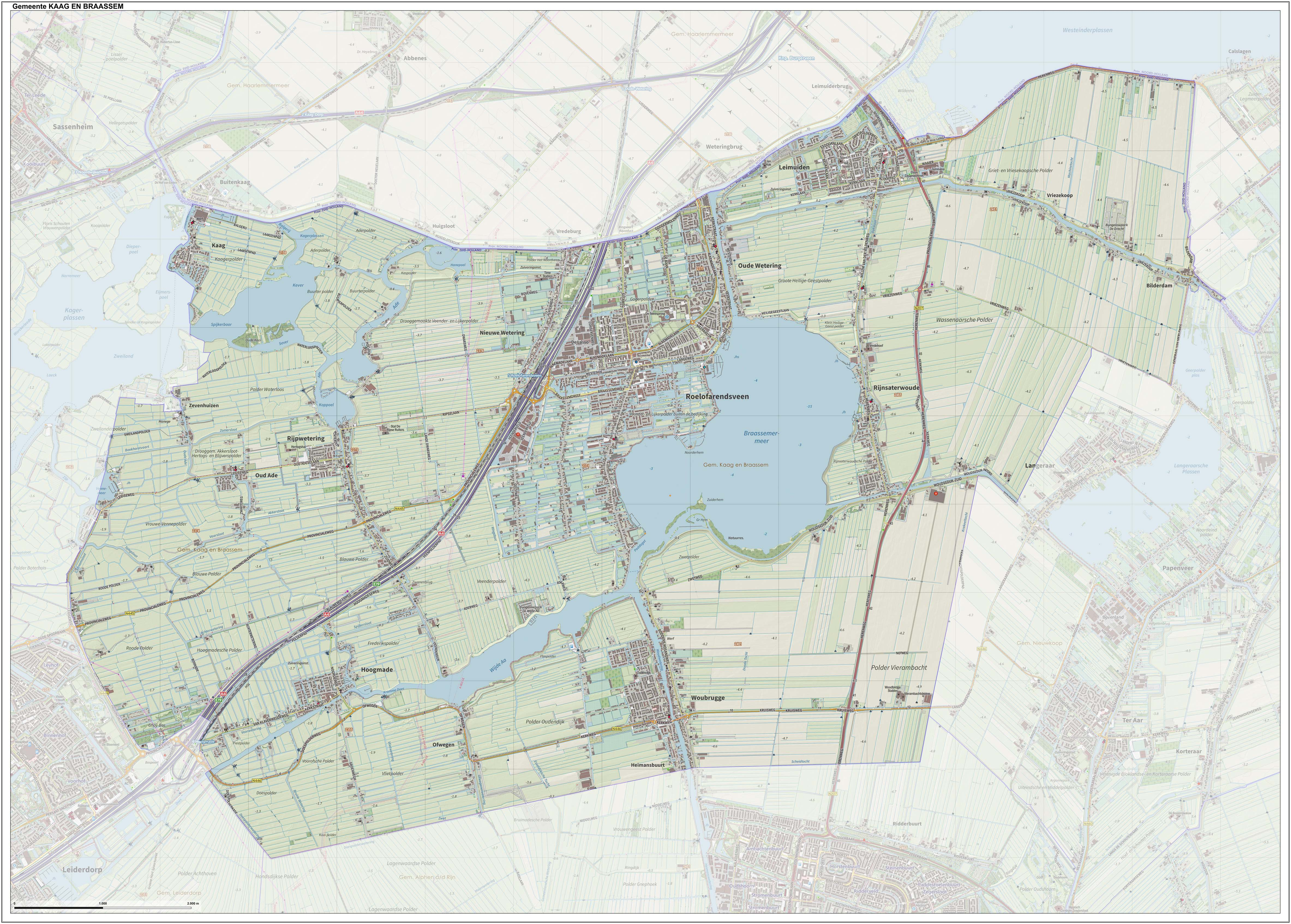
Topographic map of Kaag en Braassem, June 2015

== Notable people ==
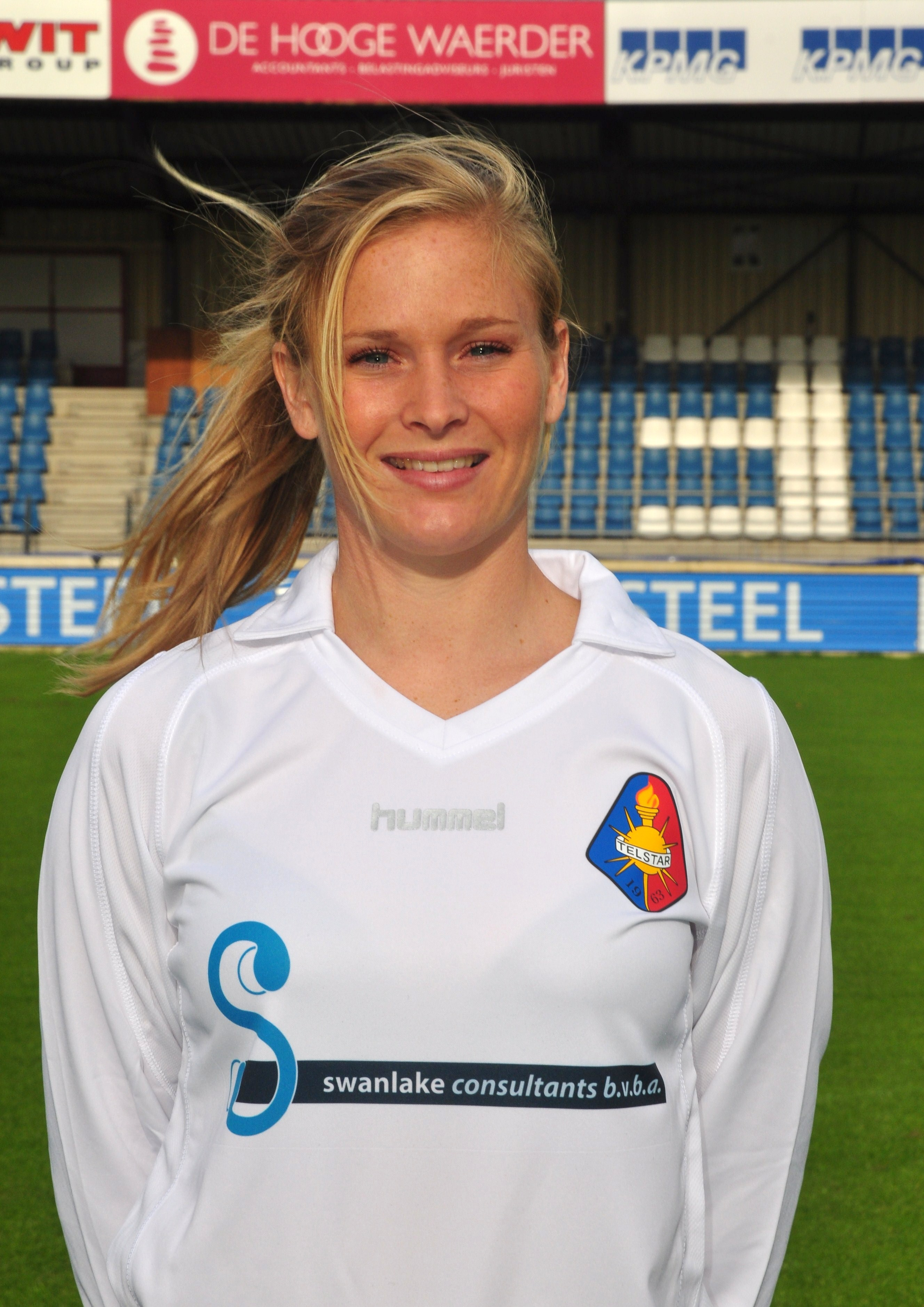
Claudia van der Heiligenberg, 2011

- Marinus Heijnes (1888 – 1963 in De Kaag) a Dutch impressionist artist of the Hague School

=== Sport ===
- Cornelis van Staveren (1889 in Leimuiden – 1982) a sailor who competed at the 1928 Summer Olympics
- Joop Zoetemelk (born 1946) a retired professional racing cyclist, raised in Rijpwetering
- Monique Velzeboer (born in Oud Ade 1969) a Dutch skater and photographer, medallist in the 1998 Winter Olympics
- Michael Buskermolen (born 1972 in Leimuiden) a Dutch retired footballer with 399 club caps with AZ Alkmaar
- Bob de Jong (born 1976 in Leimuiden) a Dutch former speed skater, silver, gold and twice bronze medallist at the 1998 2006 2010 and 2014 Winter Olympics
- Margot Boer (born 1985 in Woubrugge) a Dutch former speed skater, competed in the 2010 and 2014 Winter Olympics
- Claudia van den Heiligenberg (born 1985 in Roelofarendsveen) a Dutch footballer
- Femke Heemskerk (born 1987 in Roelofarendsveen) a Dutch competitive swimmer, gold and silver medallist at the 2008 and 2012 Summer Olympics

== Gallery ==
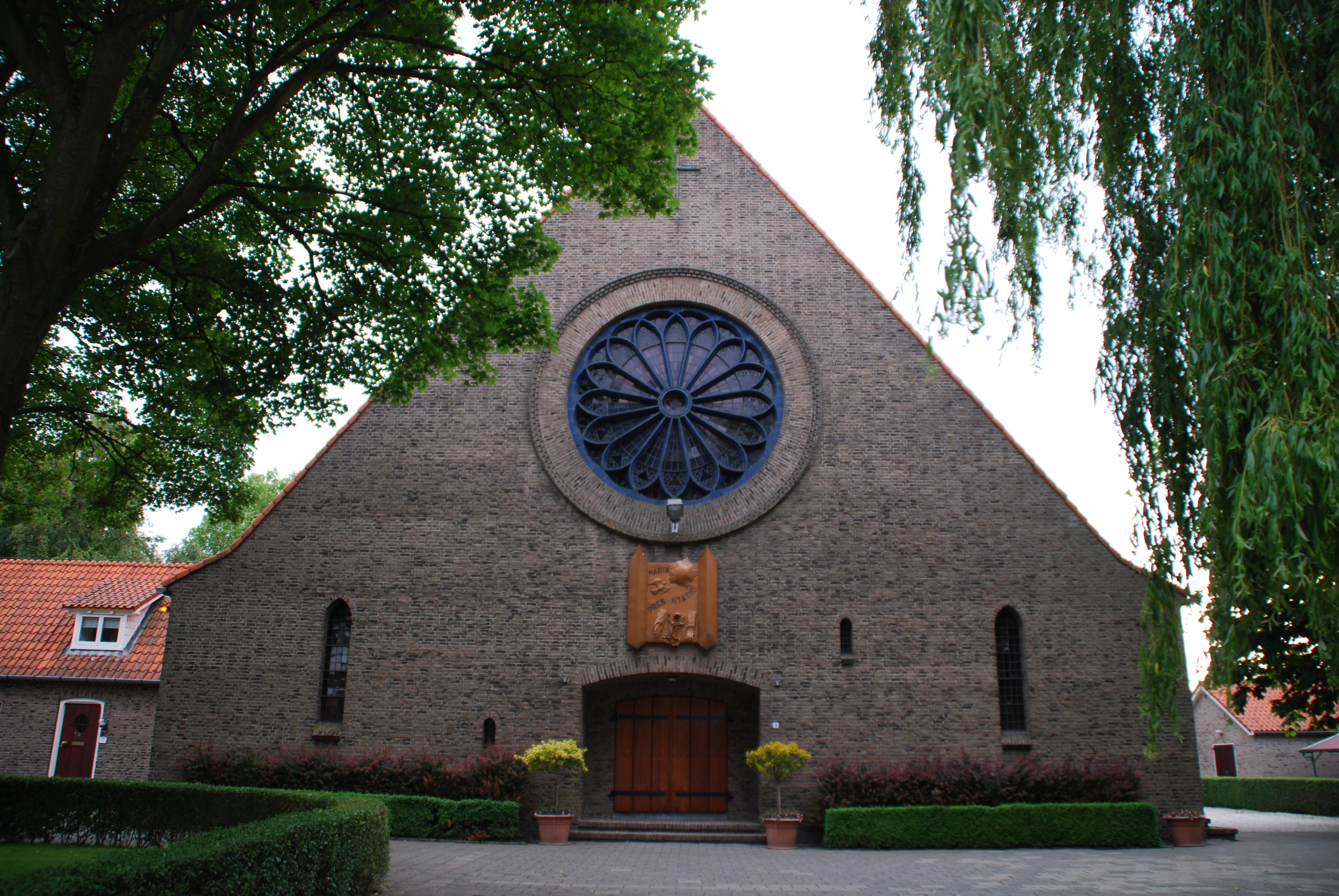
Maria Presentatiekerk - Roelofarendsveen

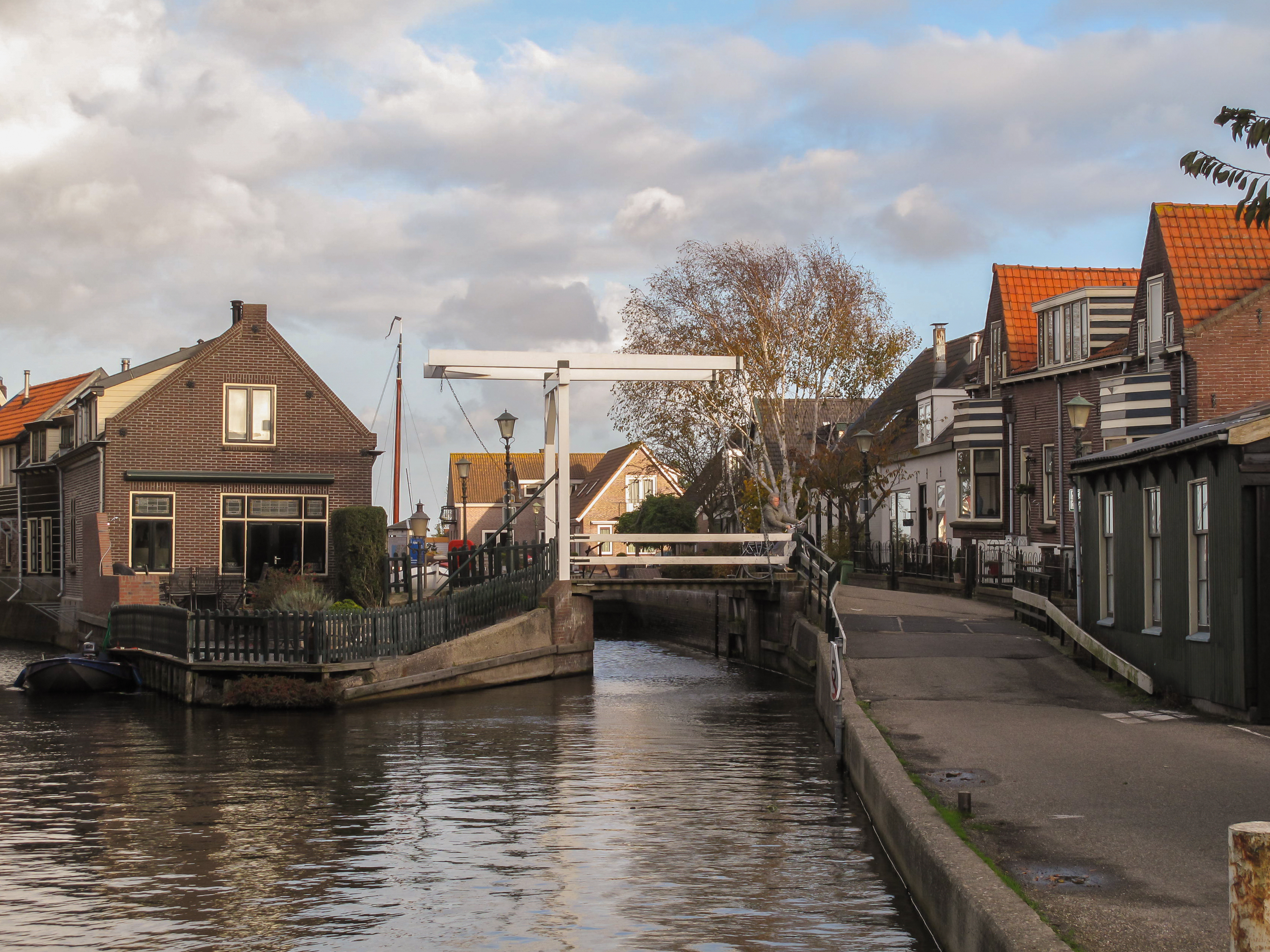
Roelofarendsveen, small bridge in the street

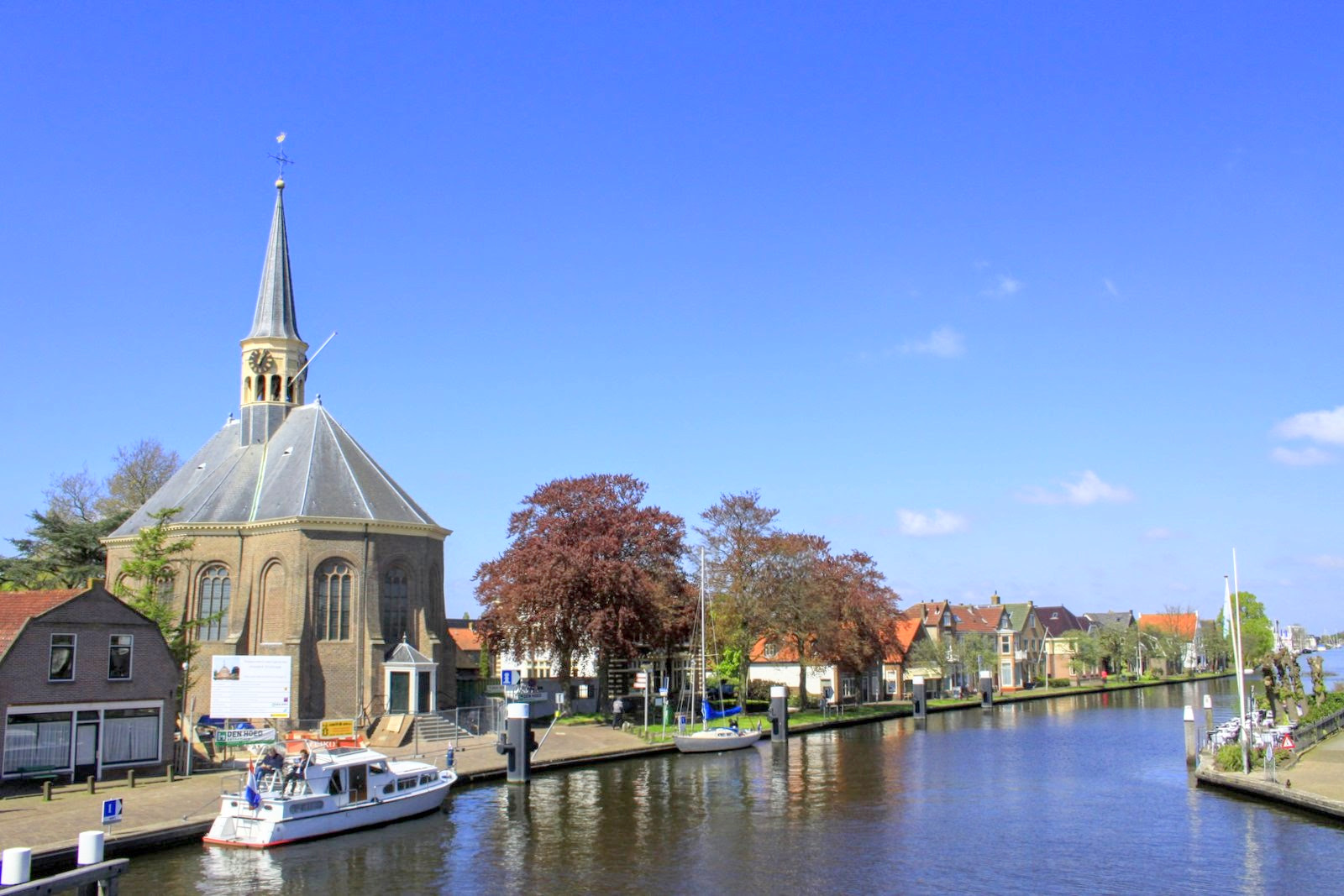
Woubrugge

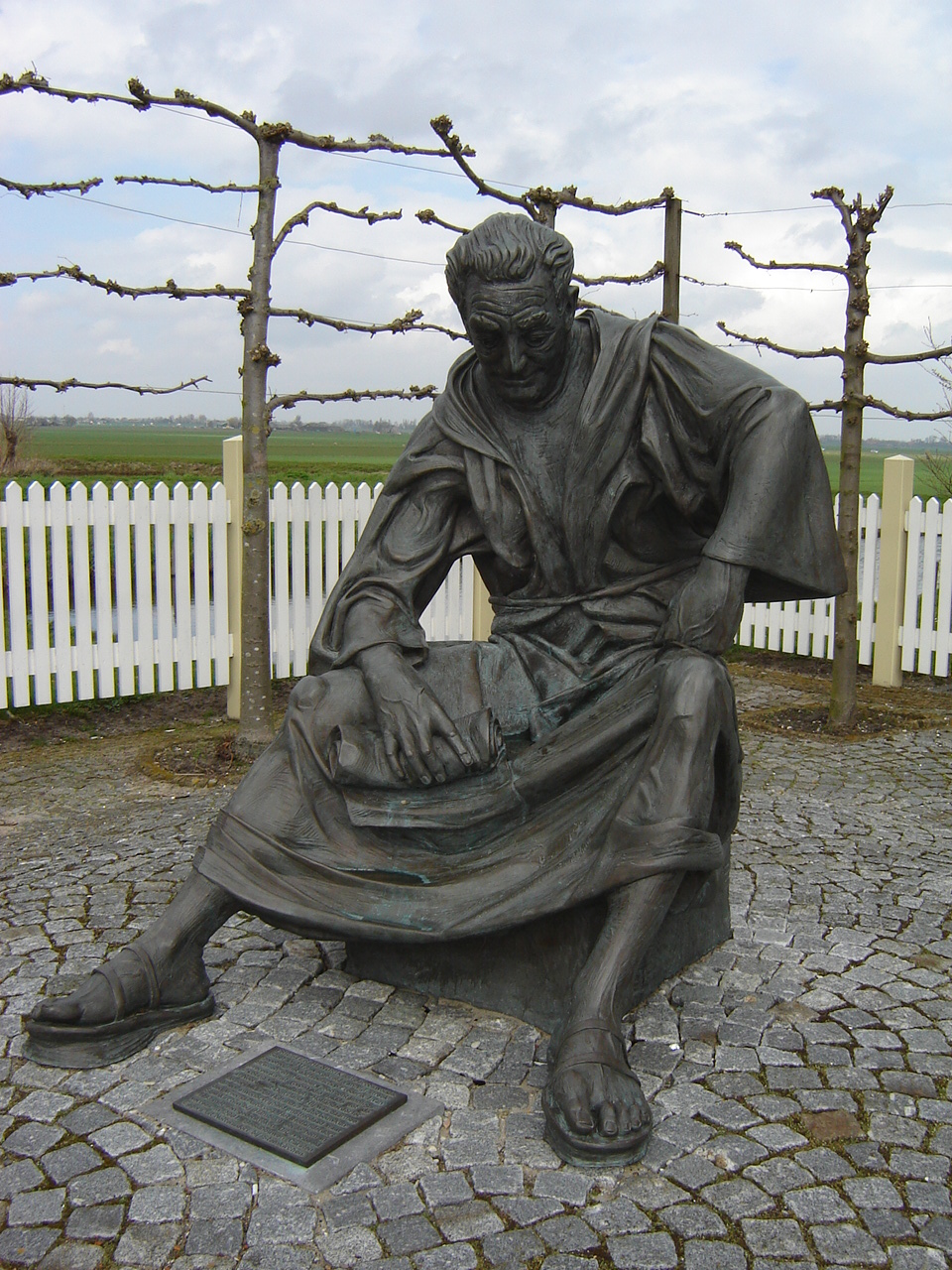
Rijnsaterwoude - Priester Hendrik

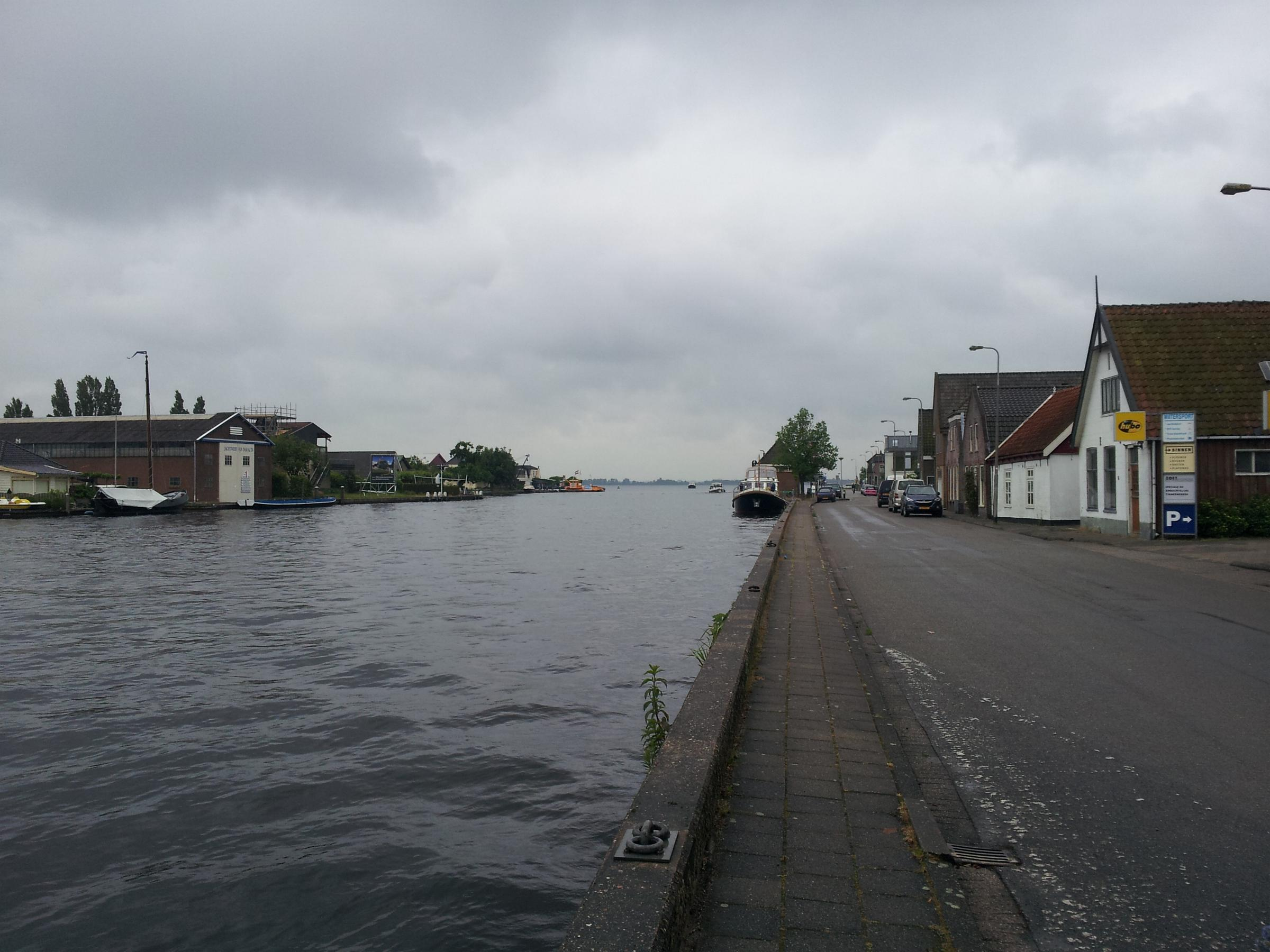
Oude Wetering de Wetering

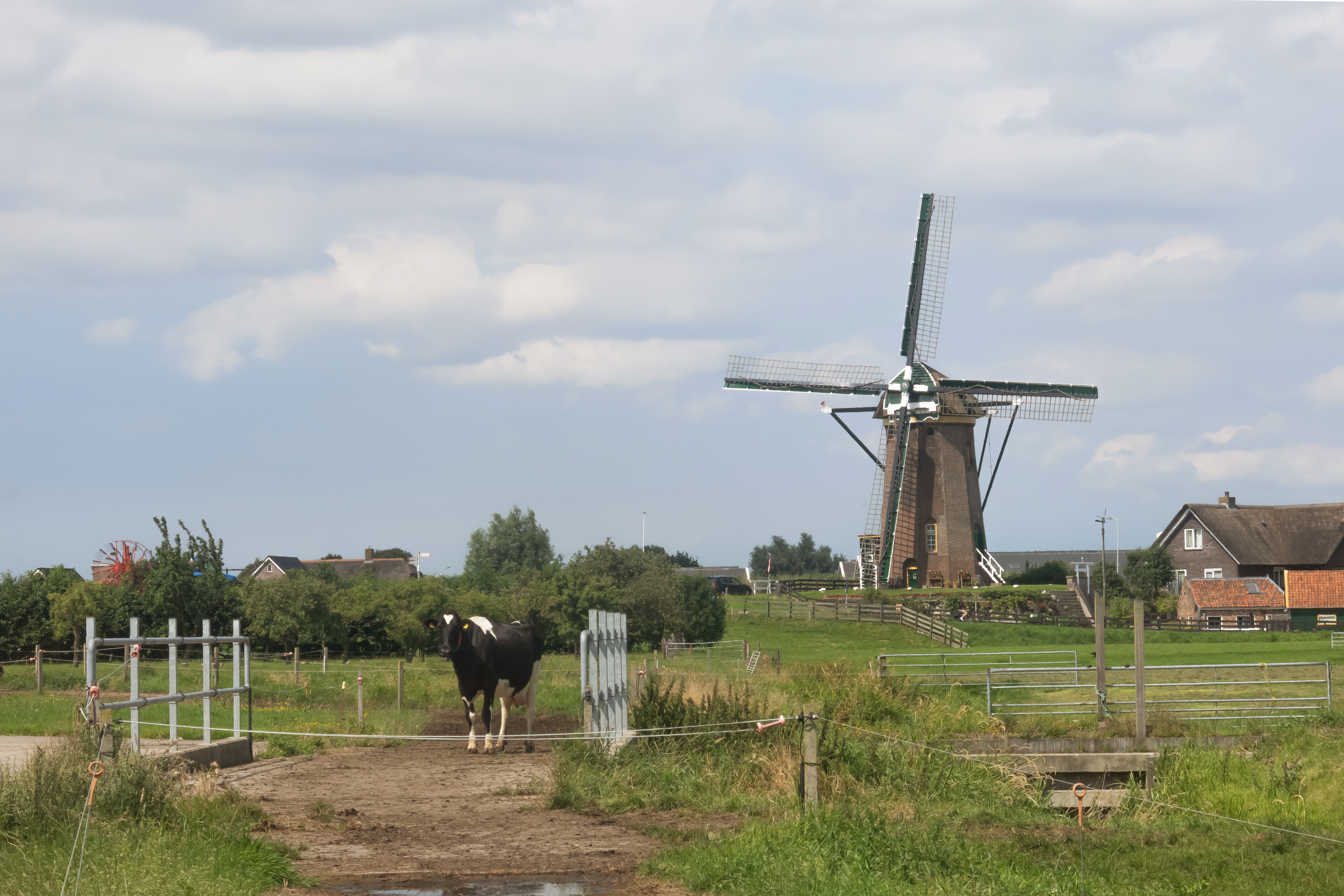
Rijpwetering, windmill: Lijkermolen no1
