= Zevenhuizen, Kaag en Braassem =

Zevenhuizen
- Hamlet
- Location in the province of South Holland in the Netherlands Location in the Netherlands
- Coordinates: 52°11′55″N 4°33′21″E
- Country: Netherlands
- Province: South Holland
- Municipality: Kaag en Braassem
- Time zone: UTC+1 (CET)
  - Summer (DST): UTC+2 (CEST)

Zevenhuizen is a hamlet in the Dutch province of South Holland. It is a partly in the municipality of Kaag en Braassem and partly in the municipality of Teylingen. Zevenhuizen lies about 7 km northeast of Leiden.

Zevenhuizen is not a statistical entity, and is considered part of Oud Ade and Warmond. It consists of about 40 houses and 70 houseboats.
