= Oude Wetering =

- Village
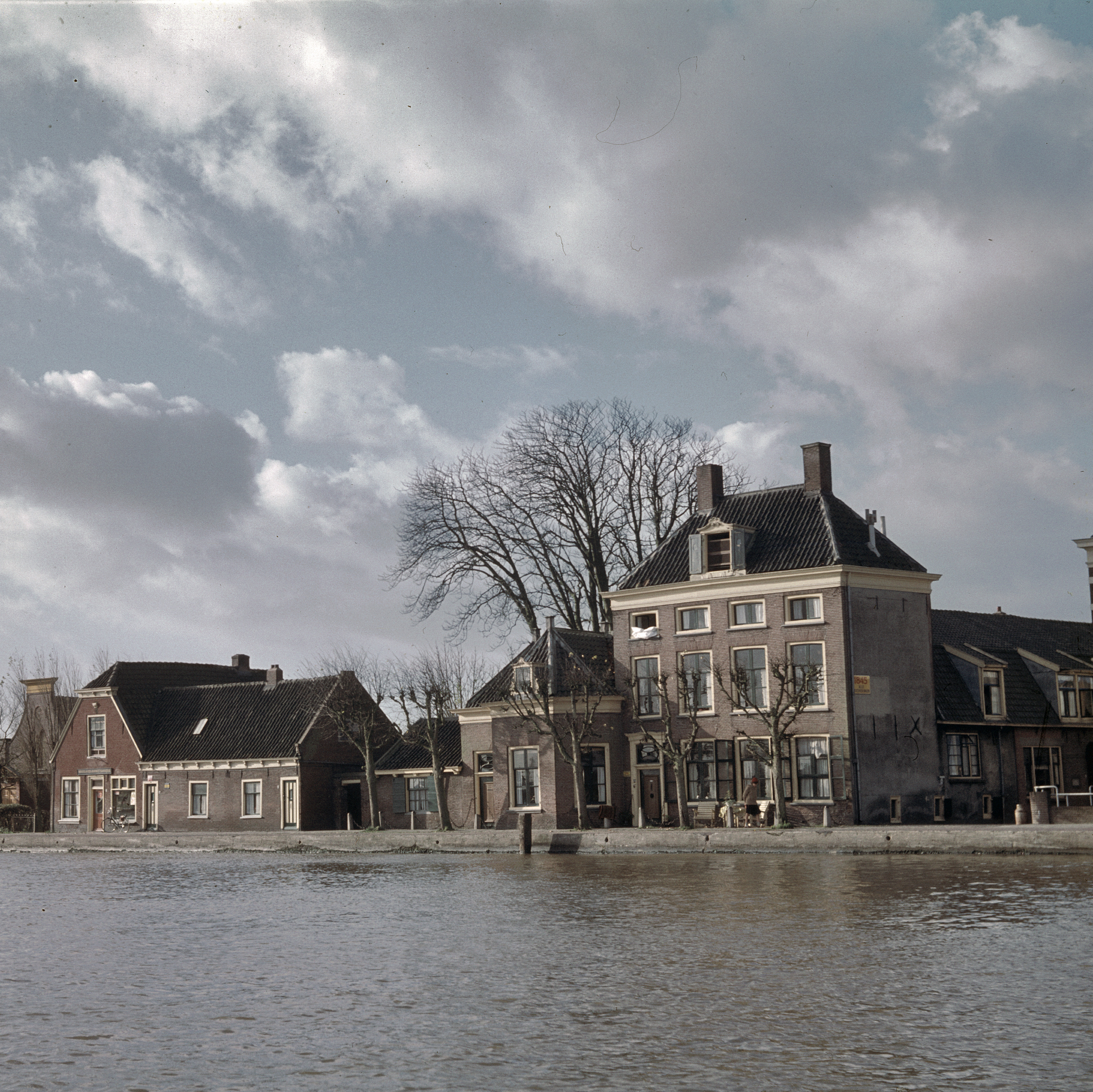
- View on Oude Wetering

- Location in the province of South Holland in the Netherlands Location in the Netherlands
- Coordinates: 52°12′58″N 4°38′34″E
- Country: Netherlands
- Province: South Holland
- Municipality: Kaag en Braassem

Area
  - Total: 1.00 km^{2} (0.39 sq mi)
- Elevation: −0.2 m (−0.66 ft)

Population (2021)
  - Total: 2,915
  - Density: 2,910/km^{2} (7,550/sq mi)
- Time zone: UTC+1 (CET)
  - Summer (DST): UTC+2 (CEST)
- Postal code: 2377
- Dialing code: 071

Oude Wetering is a village in the Dutch province of South Holland. It is located in the municipality of Kaag en Braassem, east of the town of Roelofarendsveen.

A bridge connects the village to the village of Weteringbrug in the Haarlemmermeer.

== History ==
The village was first mentioned between 1280 and 1287 as "Oude watheringhe", and means "old waterway". Oude (old) has been added to distinguish from Nieuwe Wetering. Oude Wetering is a dike village which developed along the eponymous canal which was dug in the 13th century. The village started as a peat excavation settlement.

The Dutch Reformed church is a T-shaped church with ridge turret from the 17th century. In 1843, the neoclassic front was added to church. The Catholic St Jacobus Church was built in 1966 as a replacement of the 1893 church. It burnt down in 1969, and was rebuilt in the same style. It used to have a detached belfry, but the bells were sold to a church in Brielle.

Oude Wetering was home to 622 people in 1840. In 1912, a railway station opened on the Hoofddorp to Leiden Heerensingel railway line. The line closed in 1936, and the building was demolished in 1938. After World War II, Oude Wetering started to form a single urban area with Roelofarendsveen.

== Gallery ==
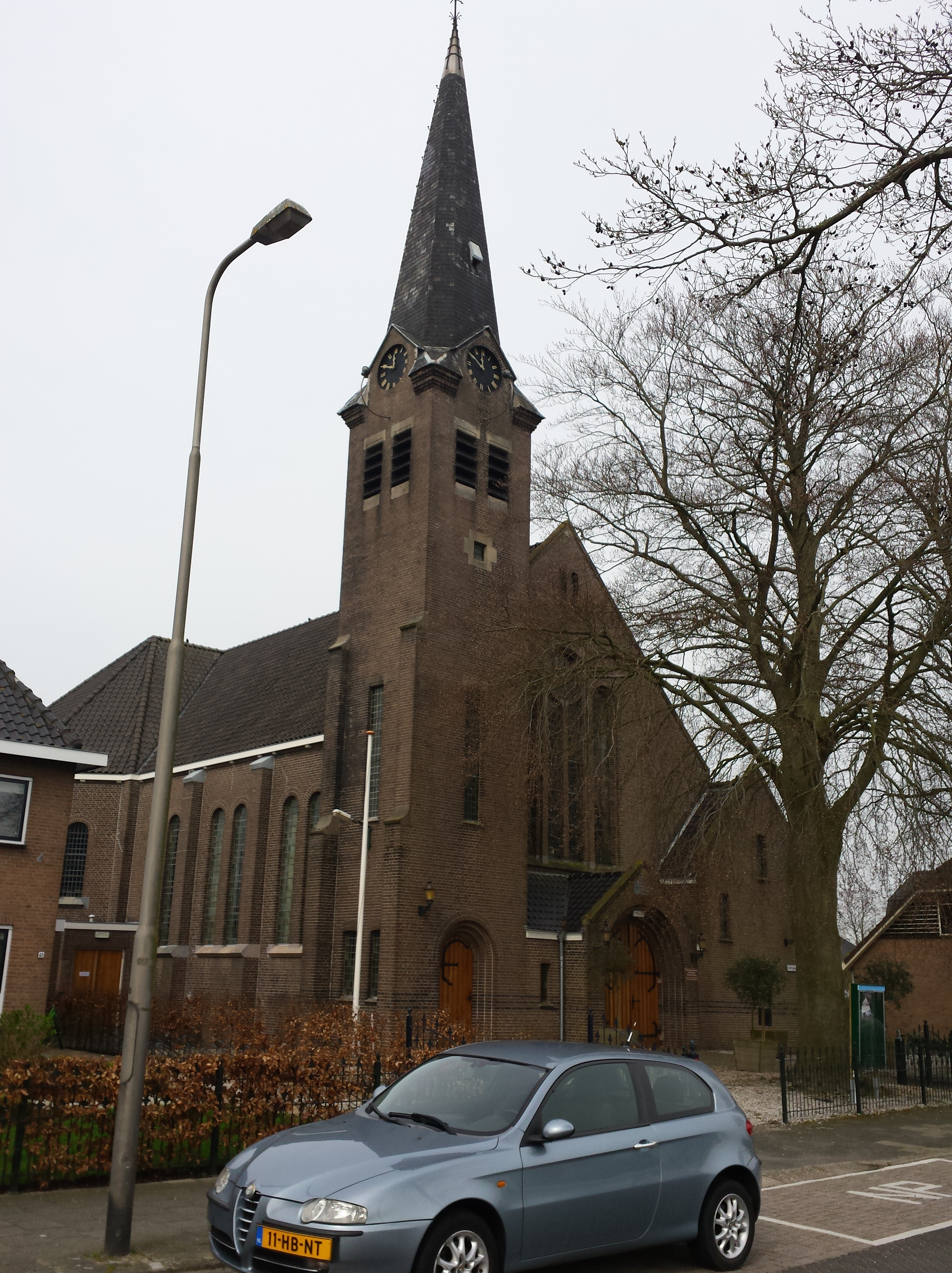
St Jacobus Church in Oude Wetering

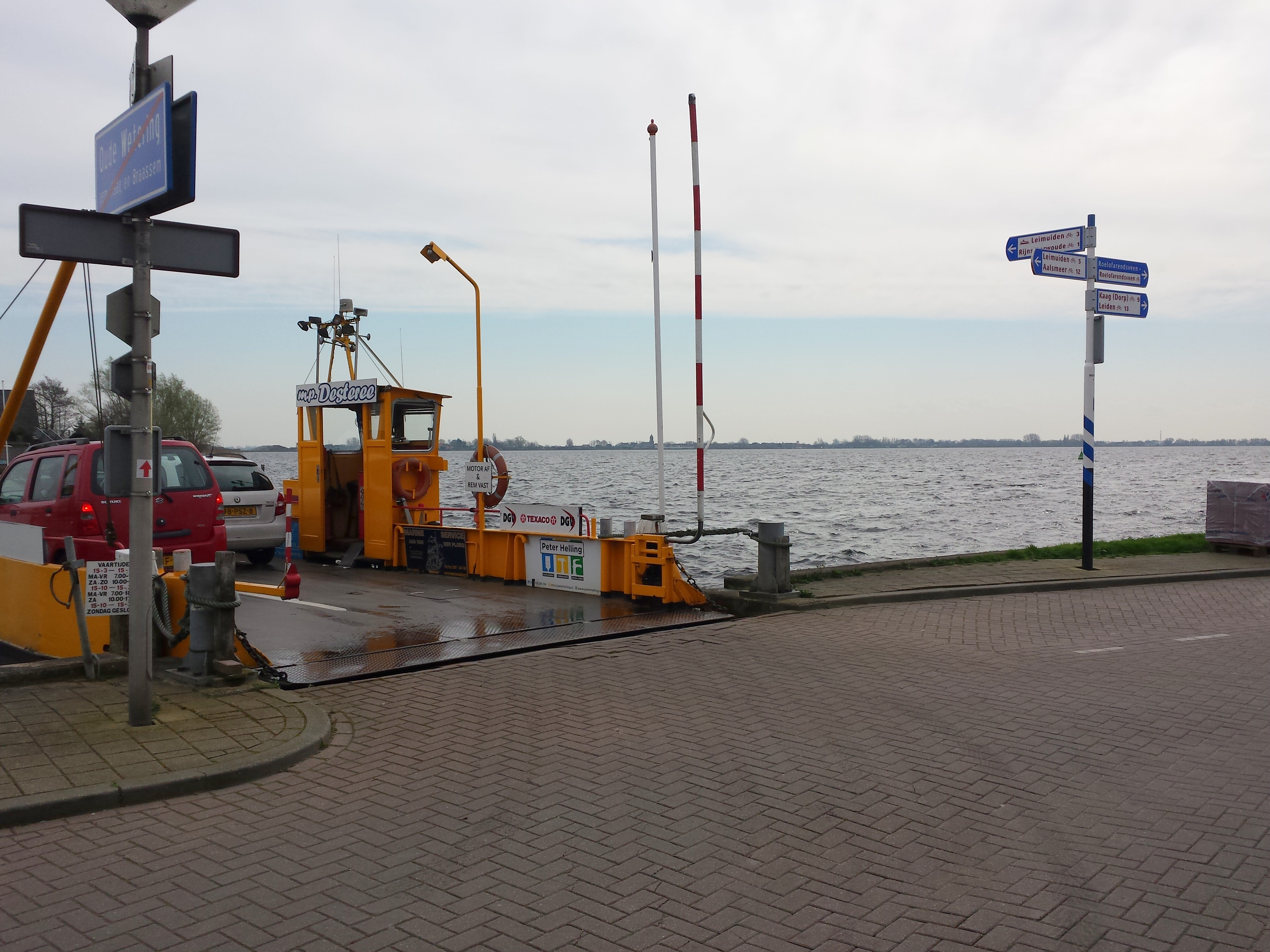
Ferry to Leimuiden

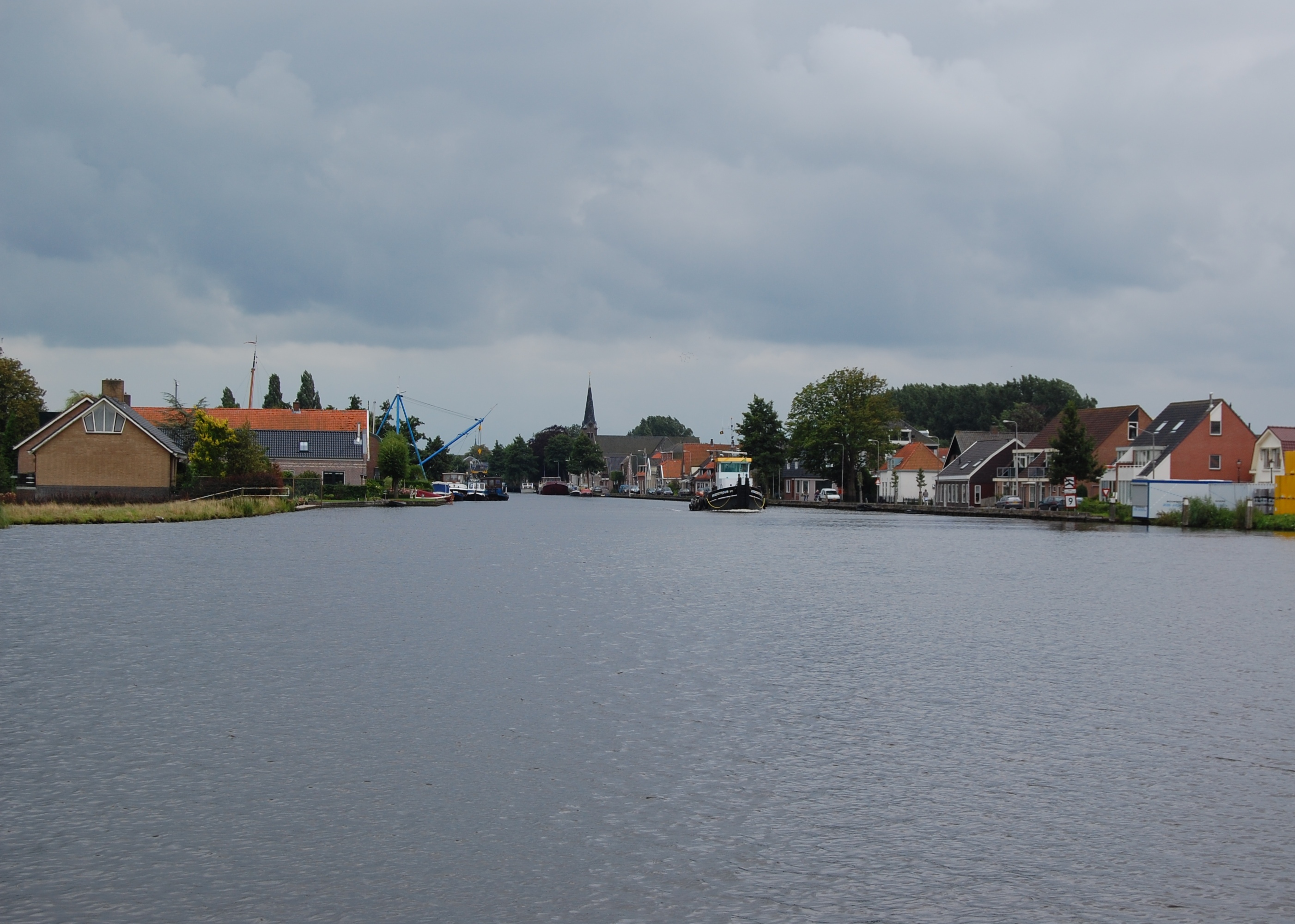
View from the Haarlemmermeer

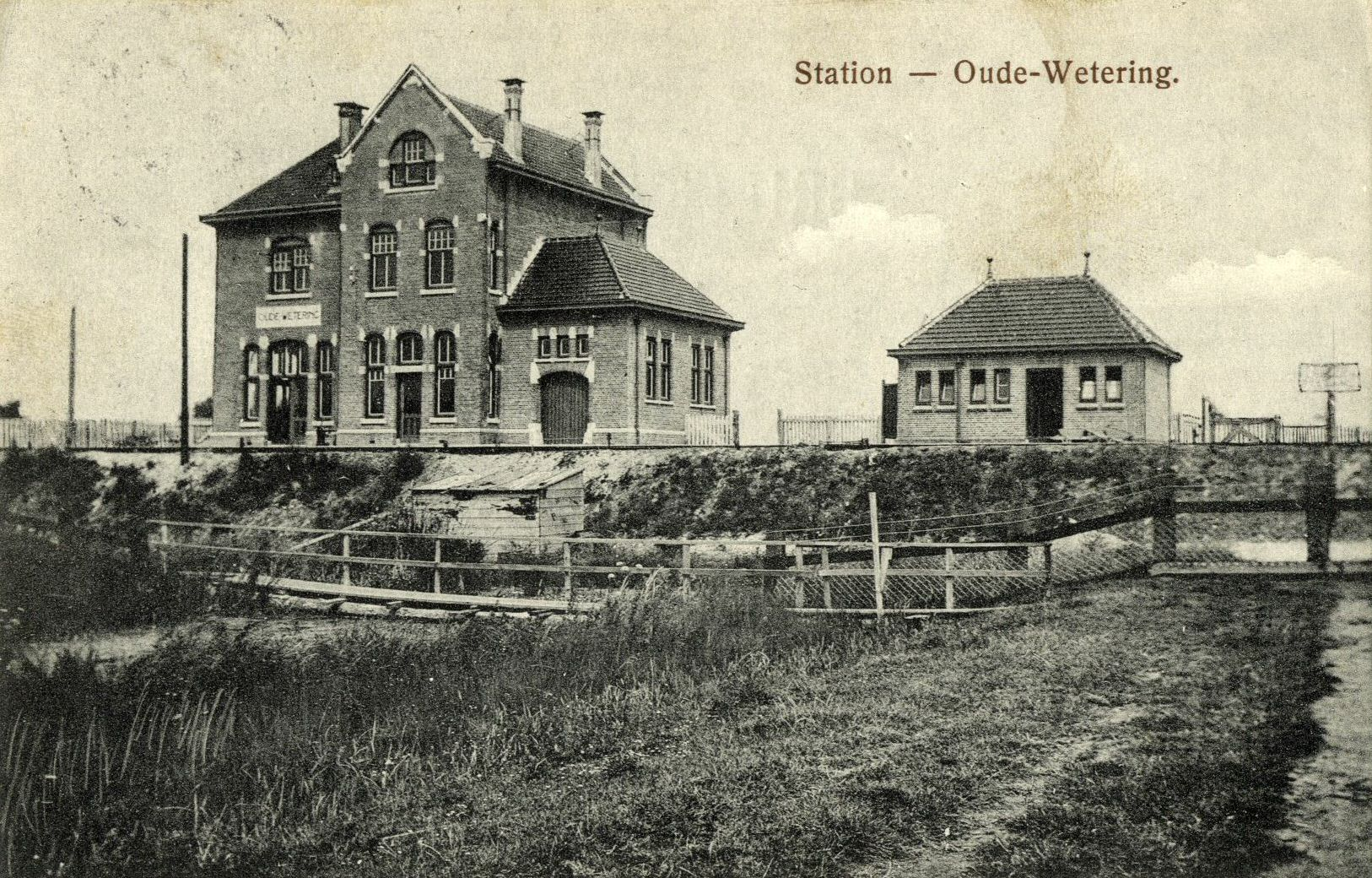
Former railway station
