= Rijpwetering =

- Village
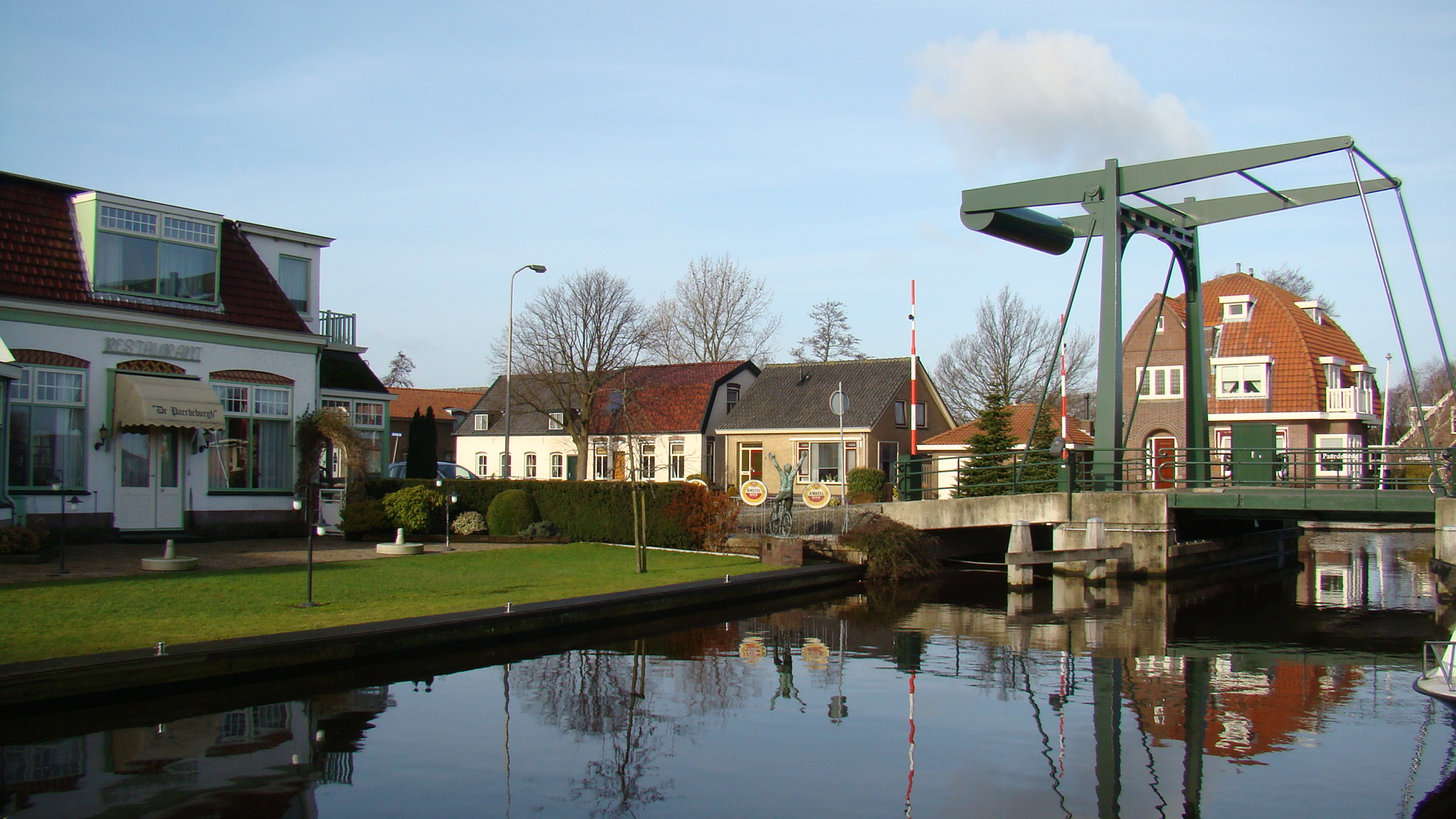
- The centre of Rijpwetering

- Location in the province of South Holland in the Netherlands Location in the Netherlands
- Coordinates: 52°12′N 4°35′E
- Country: Netherlands
- Province: South Holland
- Municipality: Kaag en Braassem

Area
  - Total: 2.11 km^{2} (0.81 sq mi)
- Elevation: −0.4 m (−1.3 ft)

Population (2021)
  - Total: 1,640
  - Density: 777/km^{2} (2,010/sq mi)
- Time zone: UTC+1 (CET)
  - Summer (DST): UTC+2 (CEST)
- Postal code: 2375
- Dialing code: 071

Rijpwetering is a village in the Dutch province of South Holland. It is a part of the municipality of Kaag en Braassem, and lies about 8 kilometres (5.0 mi) east of Leiden.

== History ==
The village was first mentioned in 1615 as "Rijp weteryng", and means "bank of a waterway". Rijpwetering developed in the Middle Ages as a peat excavation settlement.

The Catholic O.L. Vrouwe Geboorte Church is a three aisled basilica-like church with built-in tower which was constructed between 1858 and 1860 in Gothic Revival style. It was restored between 1997 and 2000. The inn De Vergulden Vos dates from 1618 and has served as inn, weigh house and court house. The polder mills Lijkermolen No.1 and No.2 were built in 1780 are the only twelve sided windmills of the Netherlands. Both wind mills are frequently in service.

Rijpwetering was home to 742 people in 1840.

== Notable people ==
- Joop Zoetemelk, Dutch cyclist and winner of the Tour de France 1980, was born in The Hague but grew up in Rijpwetering.

== Gallery ==
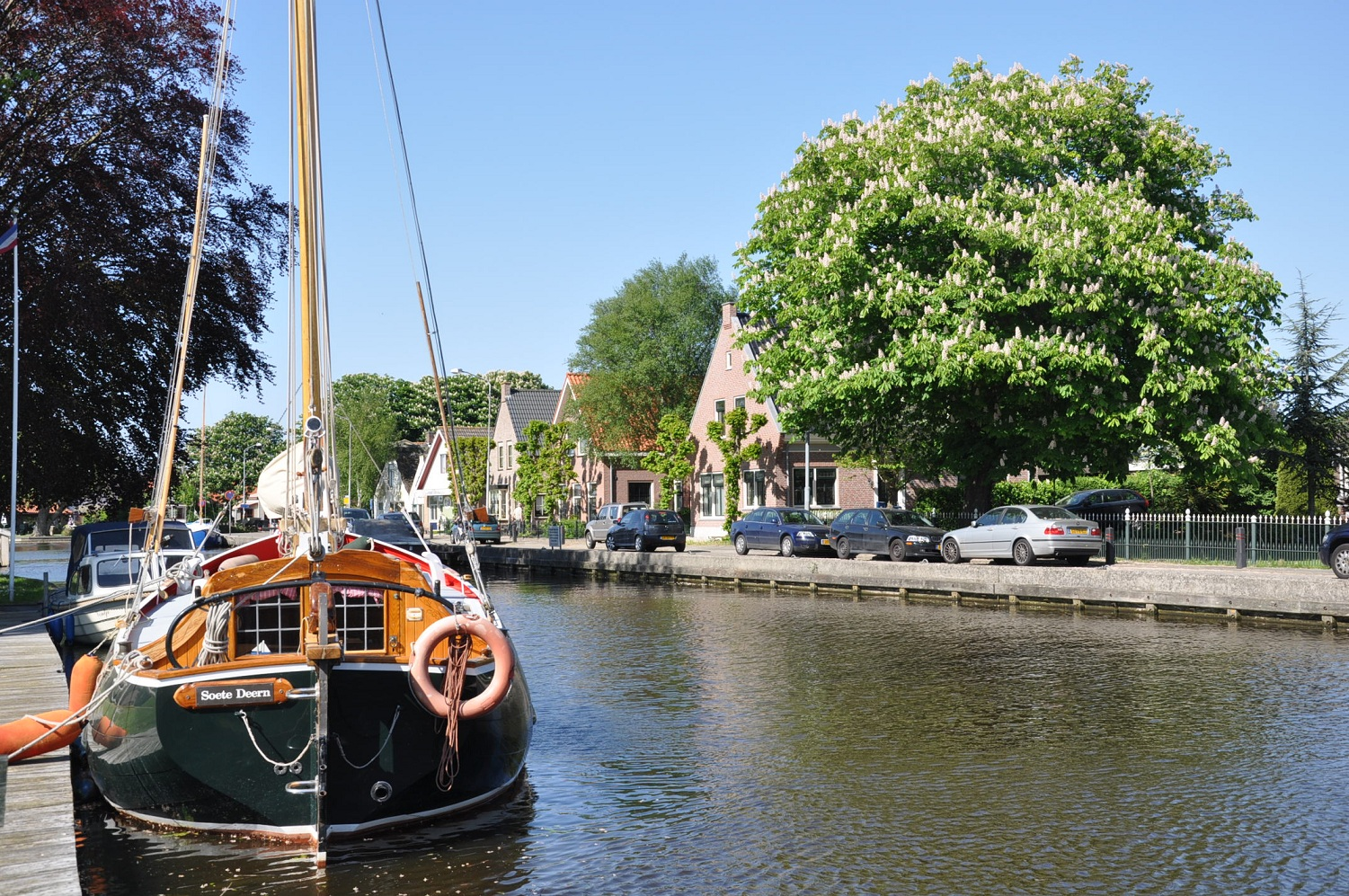
Boats in Rijpwetering

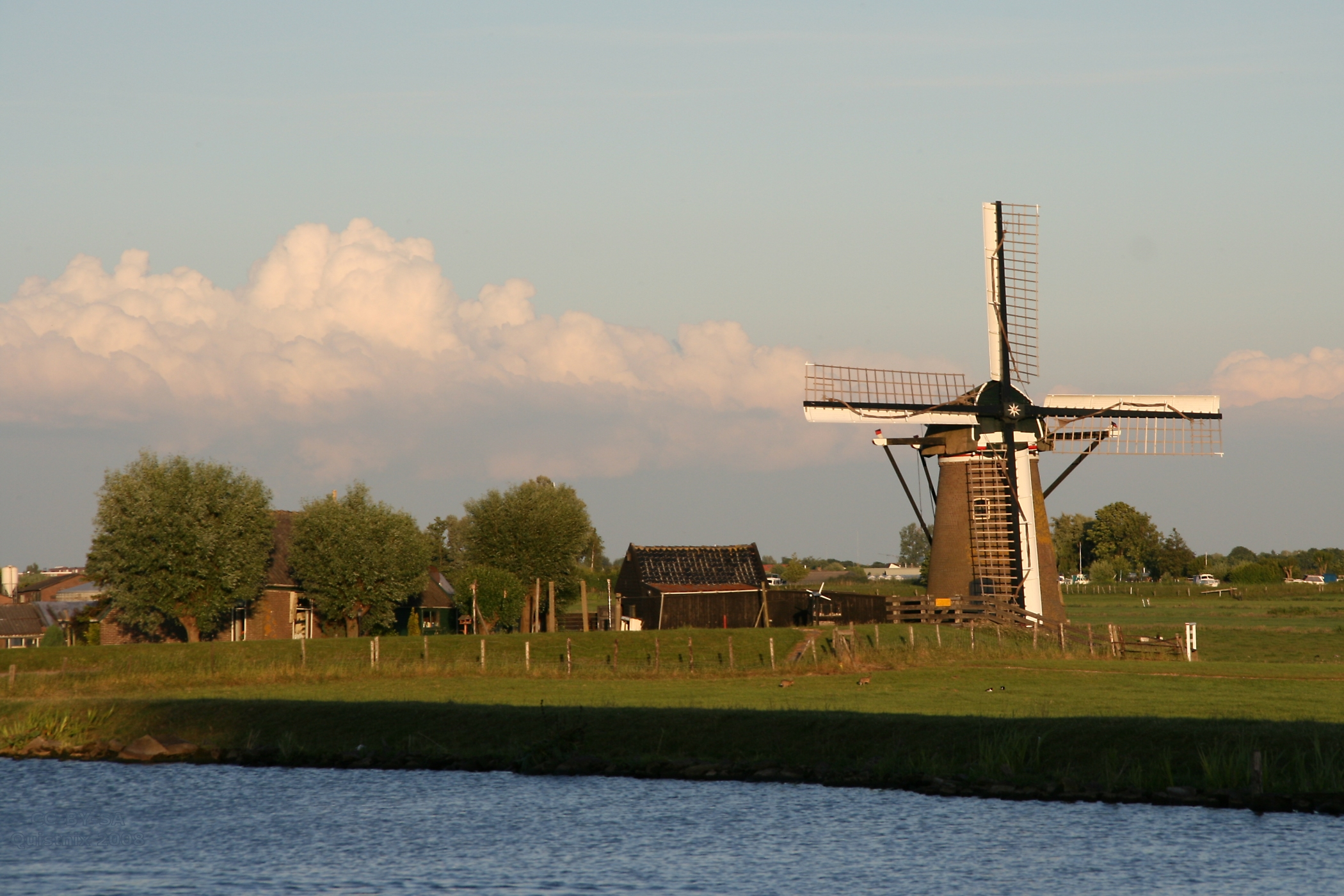
The Adermolen ('Ader mill')

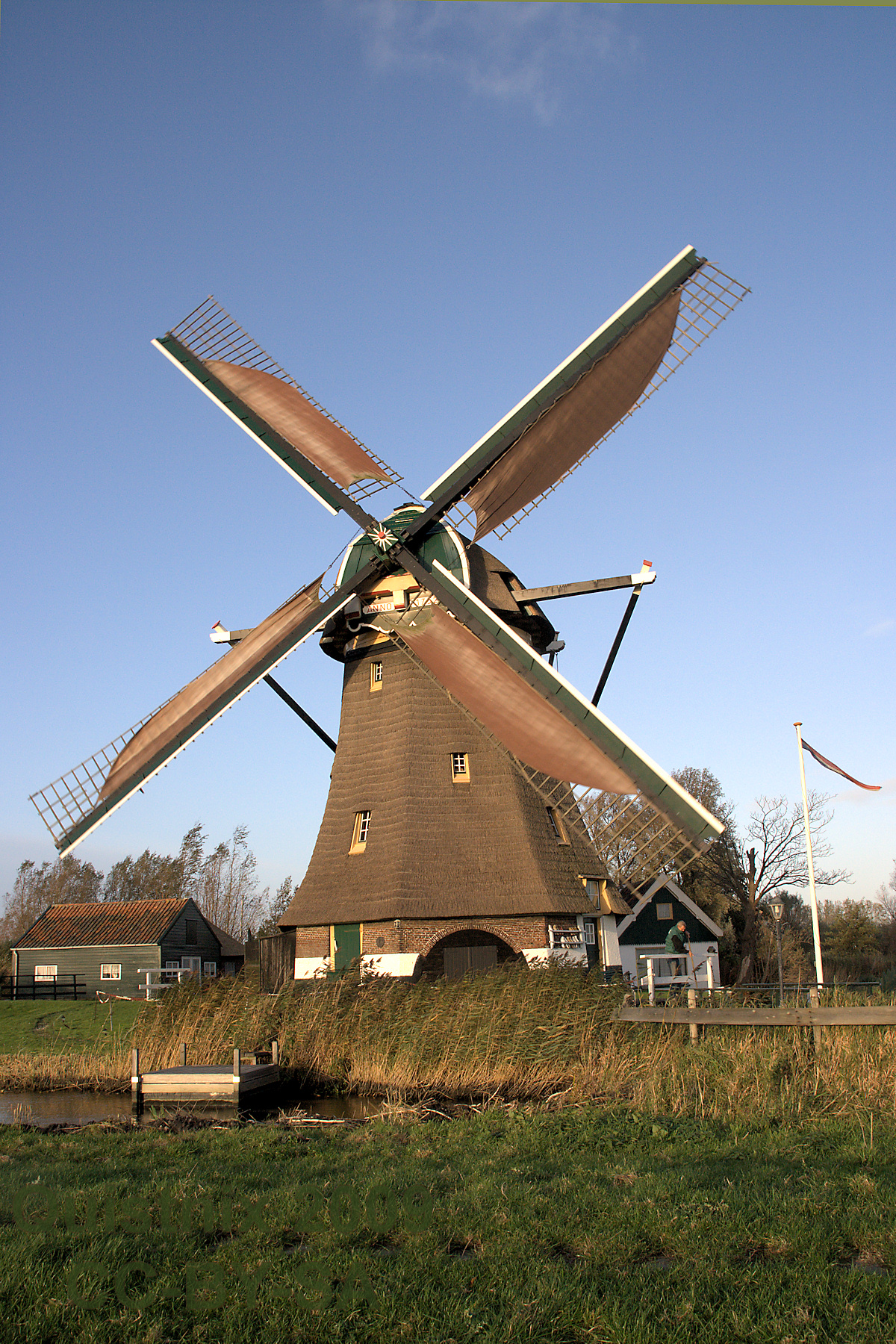
The Moppemolen ('Moppe mill')

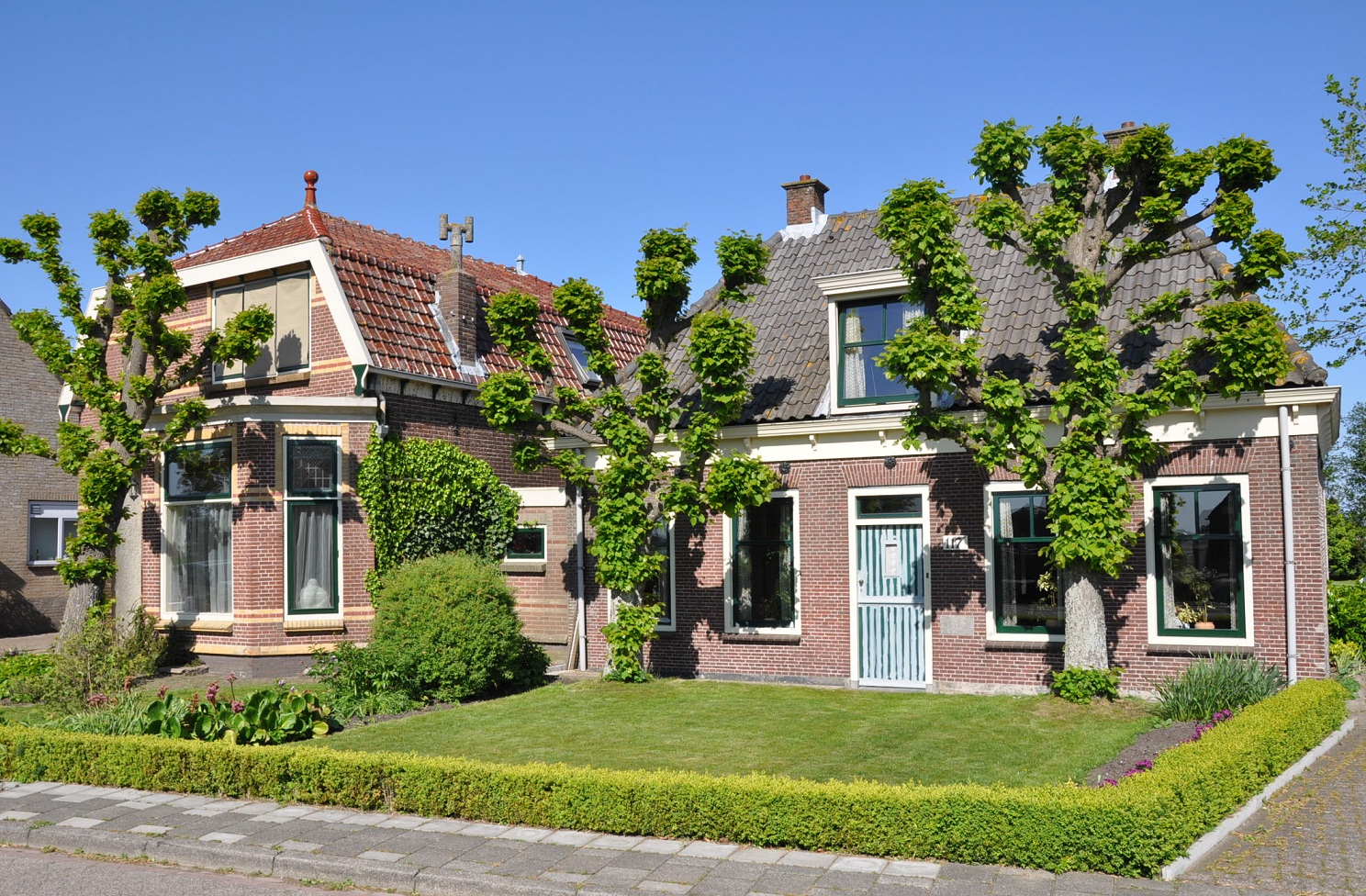
Houses on the 'Pastoor van der Plaatstraat'

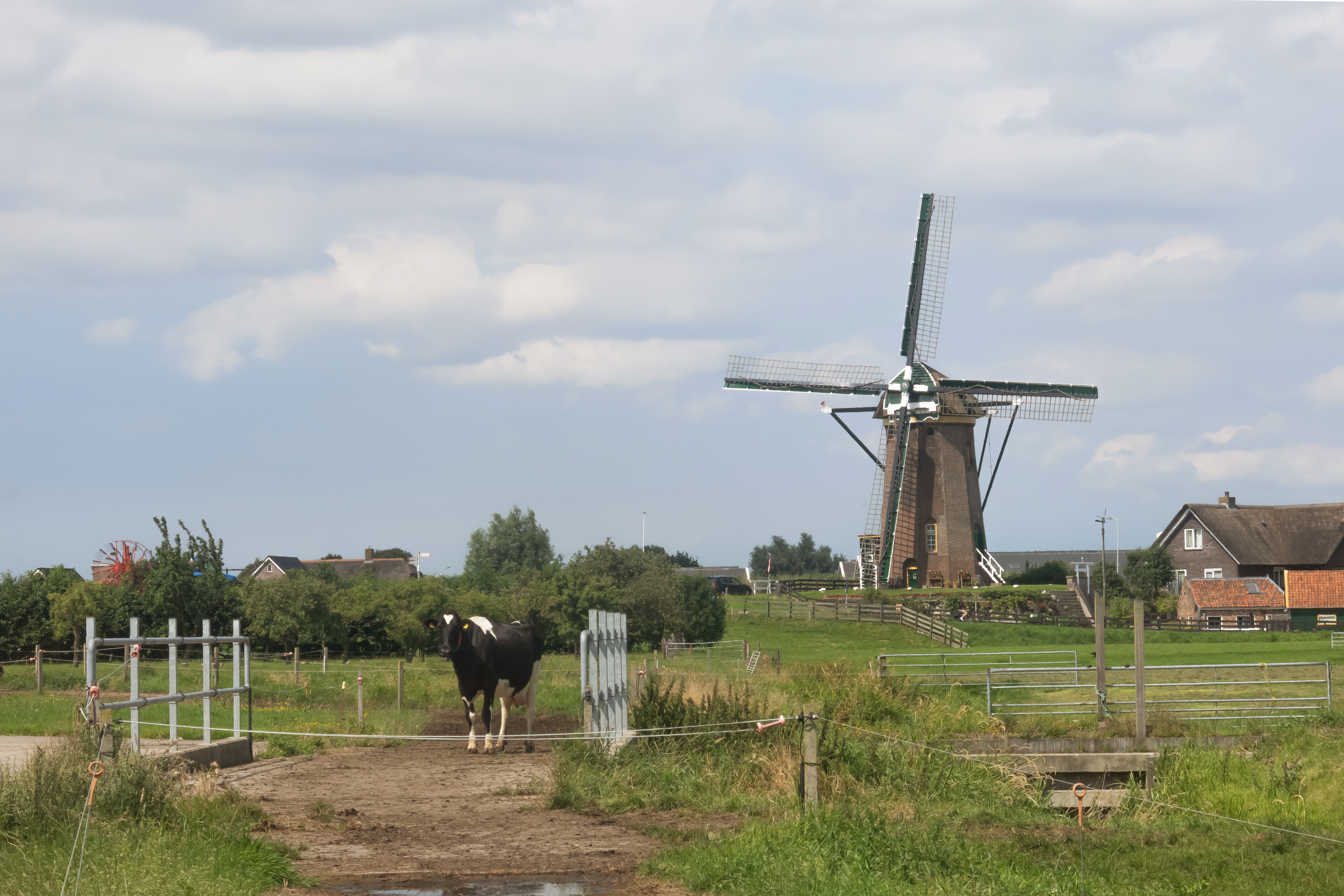
Windmill: Lijkermolen no1

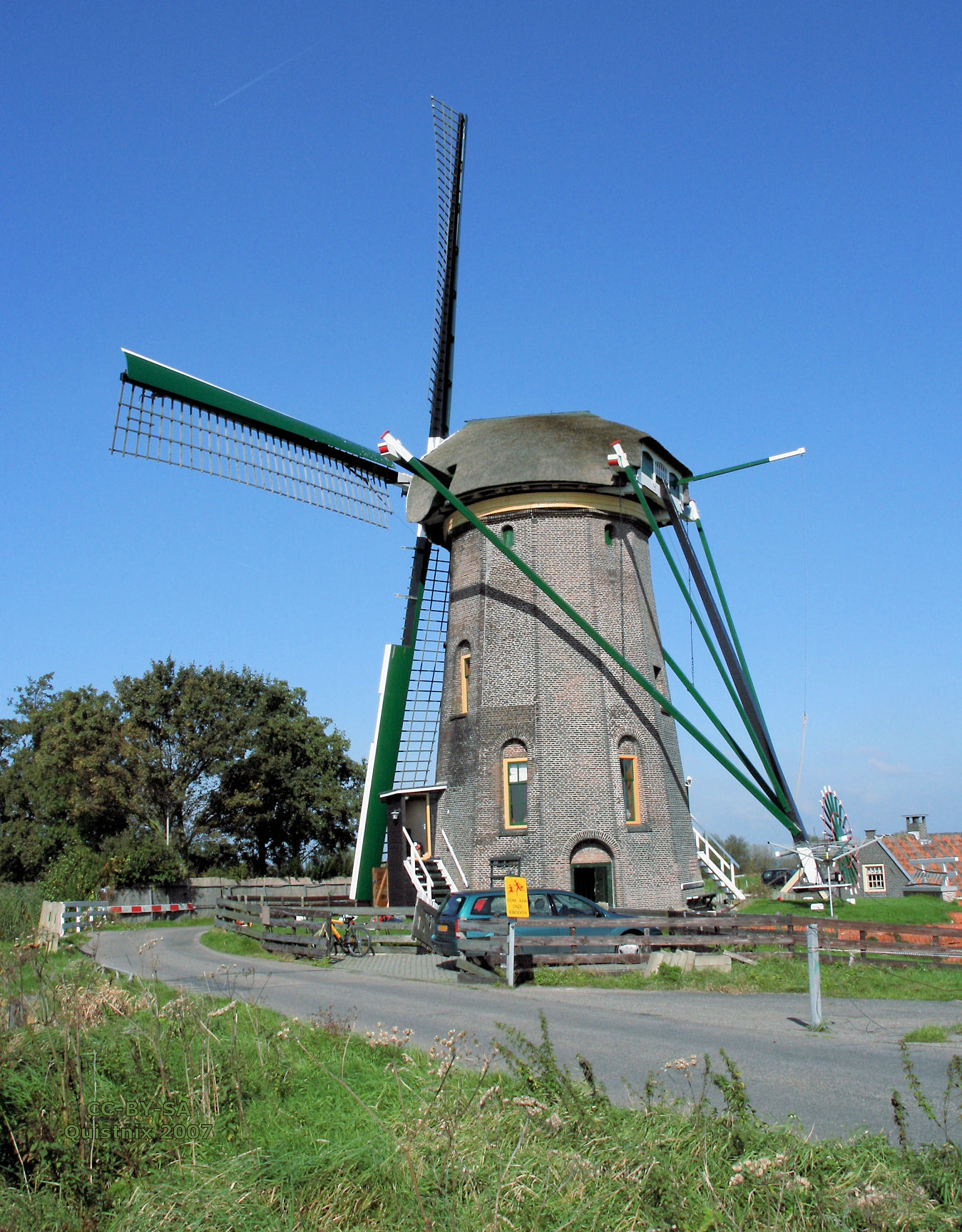
The 12-sided Lijkermolen no2 ('Lijker mill')

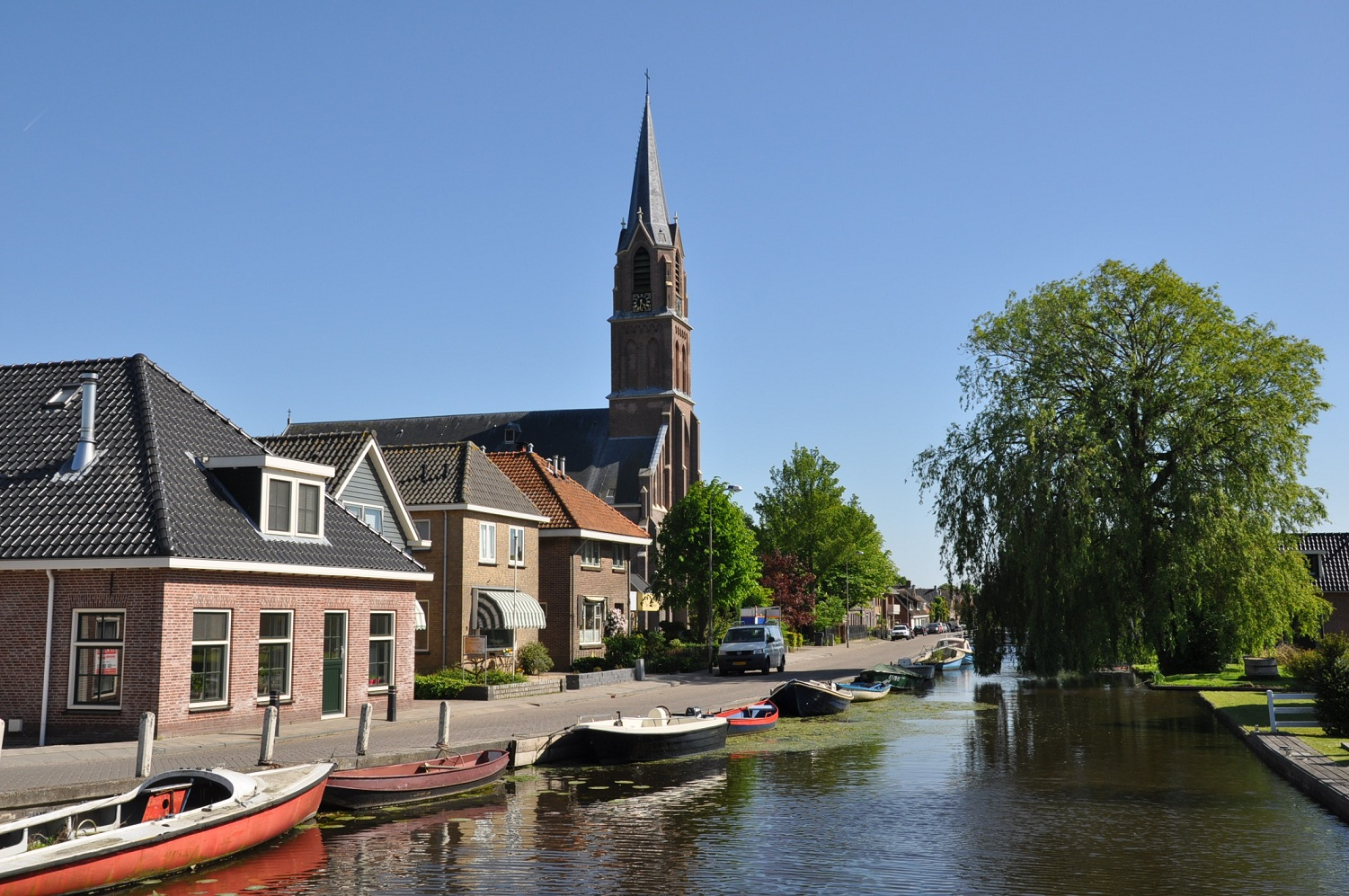
Centre with church
