= Nieuwe Wetering =

- Village
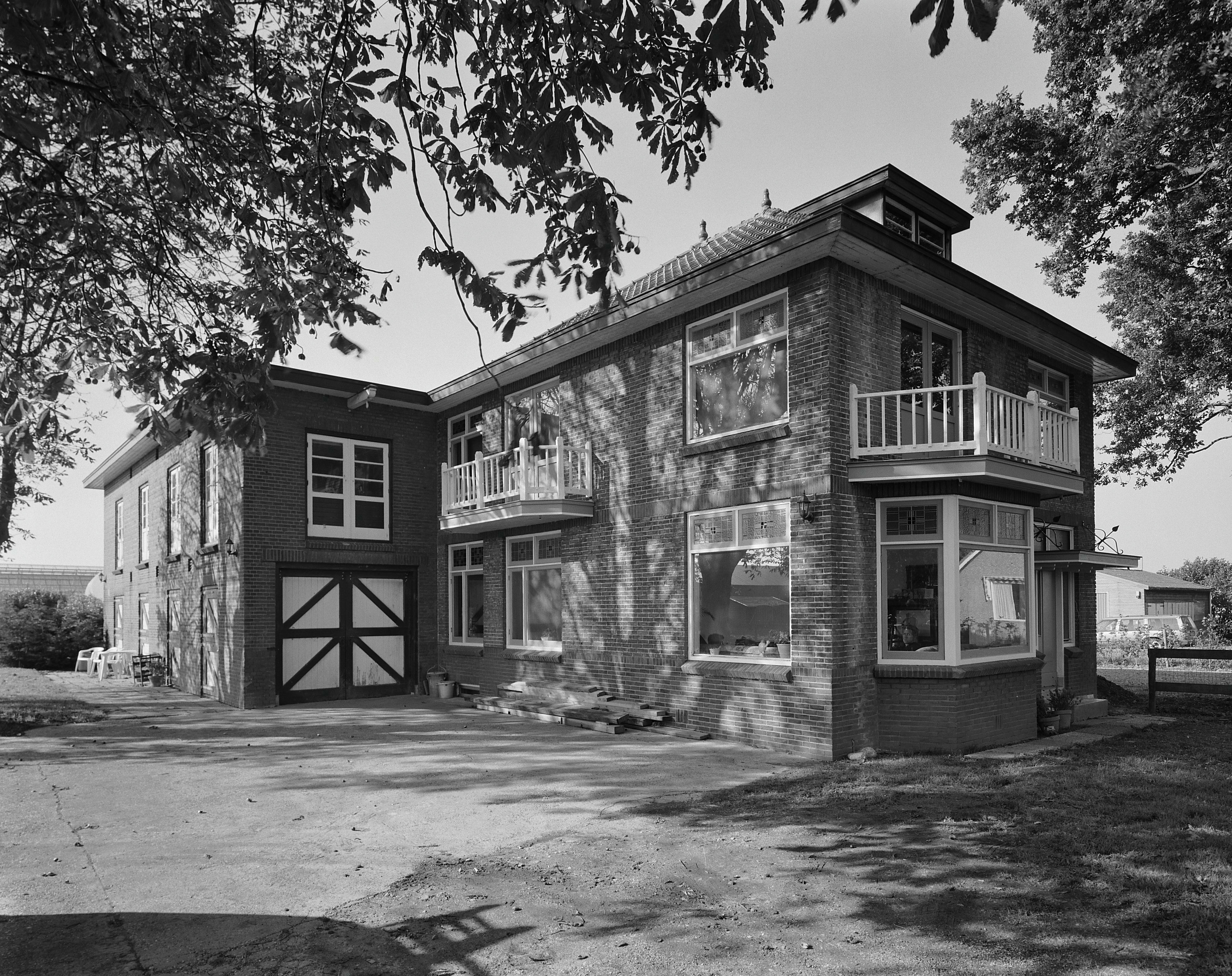
- Farm in Nieuwe Wetering

- Location in the province of South Holland in the Netherlands Location in the Netherlands
- Coordinates: 52°12′N 4°37′E
- Country: Netherlands
- Province: South Holland
- Municipality: Kaag en Braassem

Area
  - Total: 0.45 km^{2} (0.17 sq mi)
- Elevation: −0.8 m (−2.6 ft)

Population (2021)
  - Total: 640
  - Density: 1,400/km^{2} (3,700/sq mi)
- Time zone: UTC+1 (CET)
  - Summer (DST): UTC+2 (CEST)
- Postal code: 2376
- Dialing code: 071

Nieuwe Wetering is a village in the Dutch province of South Holland. It is a part of the municipality of Kaag en Braassem, and lies about 10 km east of Leiden.

The village was first mentioned in 1343 as "Nuwe Weteringhe", and means "new waterway". Nieuwe (new) has been added to distinguish from Oude Wetering.
