= Hoogmade =

- Village
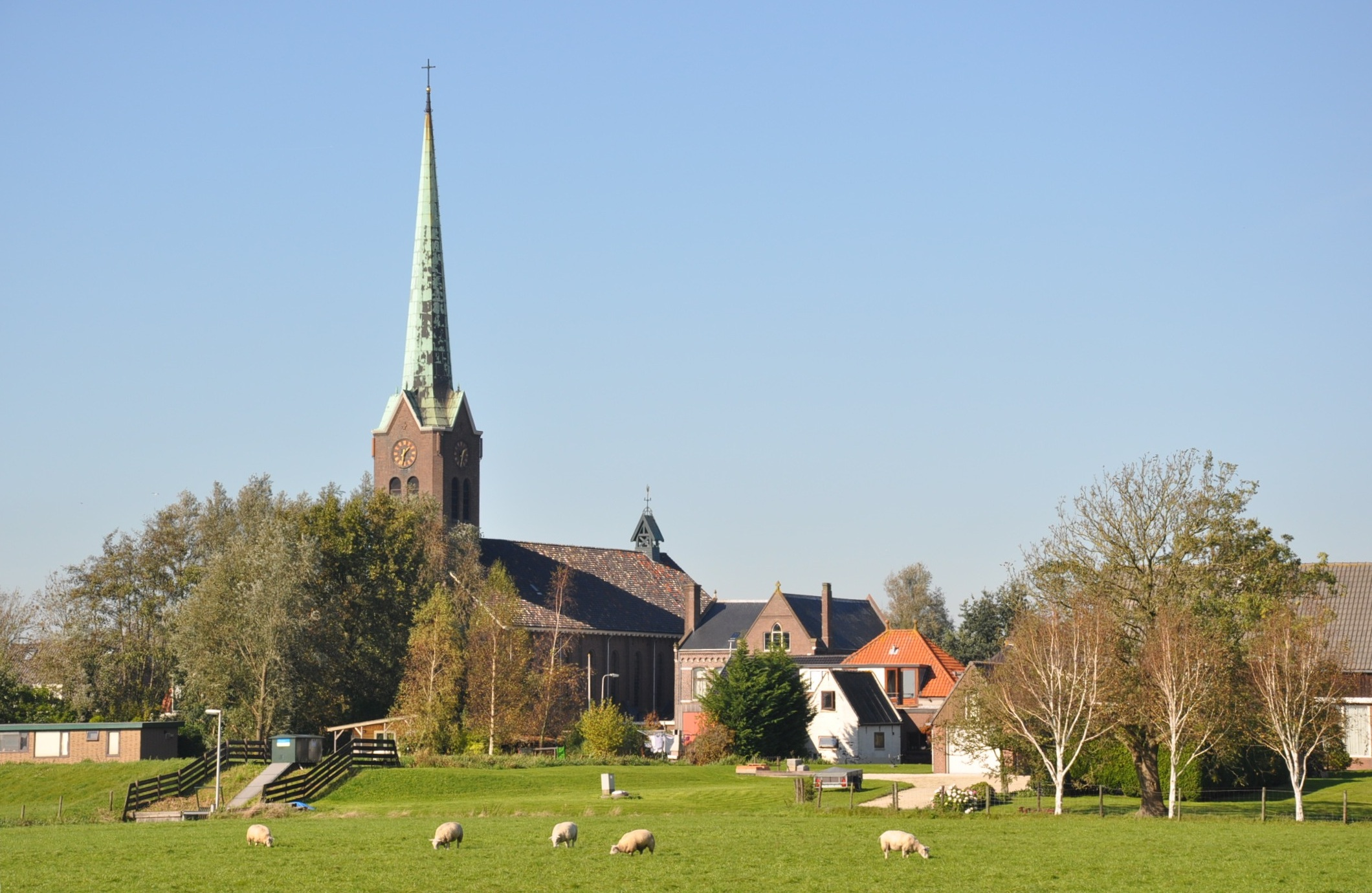
- View on Hoogmade

- Location in the province of South Holland in the Netherlands Location in the Netherlands
- Coordinates: 52°10′N 4°35′E
- Country: Netherlands
- Province: South Holland
- Municipality: Kaag en Braassem

Area
  - Total: 1.07 km^{2} (0.41 sq mi)
- Elevation: −1.0 m (−3.3 ft)

Population (2021)
  - Total: 1,460
  - Density: 1,360/km^{2} (3,530/sq mi)
- Time zone: UTC+1 (CET)
  - Summer (DST): UTC+2 (CEST)
- Postal code: 2355
- Dialing code: 071
- Major roads: A4 N446

Hoogmade is a village in the Dutch province of South Holland. It is located about 7 km east of Leiden, in the municipality of Kaag en Braassem.

== History ==
The village was first mentioned between 1280 and 1287 as "Hoghe made", and means "elevated hay land". Hoogmade is a peat excavation settlement which developed in the Middle Ages.

The Dutch Reformed church is an aisleless church with open wooden tower built between 1729 and 1730 as a replacement of the medieval church. The Catholic Onze-Lieve-Vrouw-Geboorte church is an aisleless church with built-in tower with needle spire. It was built between 1931 and 1932 to replace the 1875 church which had collapsed. On 4 November 2019, the Onze-Lieve-Vrouw-Geboorte church was severely damaged by fire. With the help of many volunteers to raise money, three years after this fire the rebuilding of the church has started

The polder mill Doesmolen was built around 1636. It was in service until 1953. In 1965, it was restored and functions on a voluntary basis.

Hoogmade was home to 311 people in 1840. It was a separate municipality between 1817 and 1855, when it merged with Woubrugge. In 2009, it became part of the municipality of Kaag en Braassem.

== Gallery ==
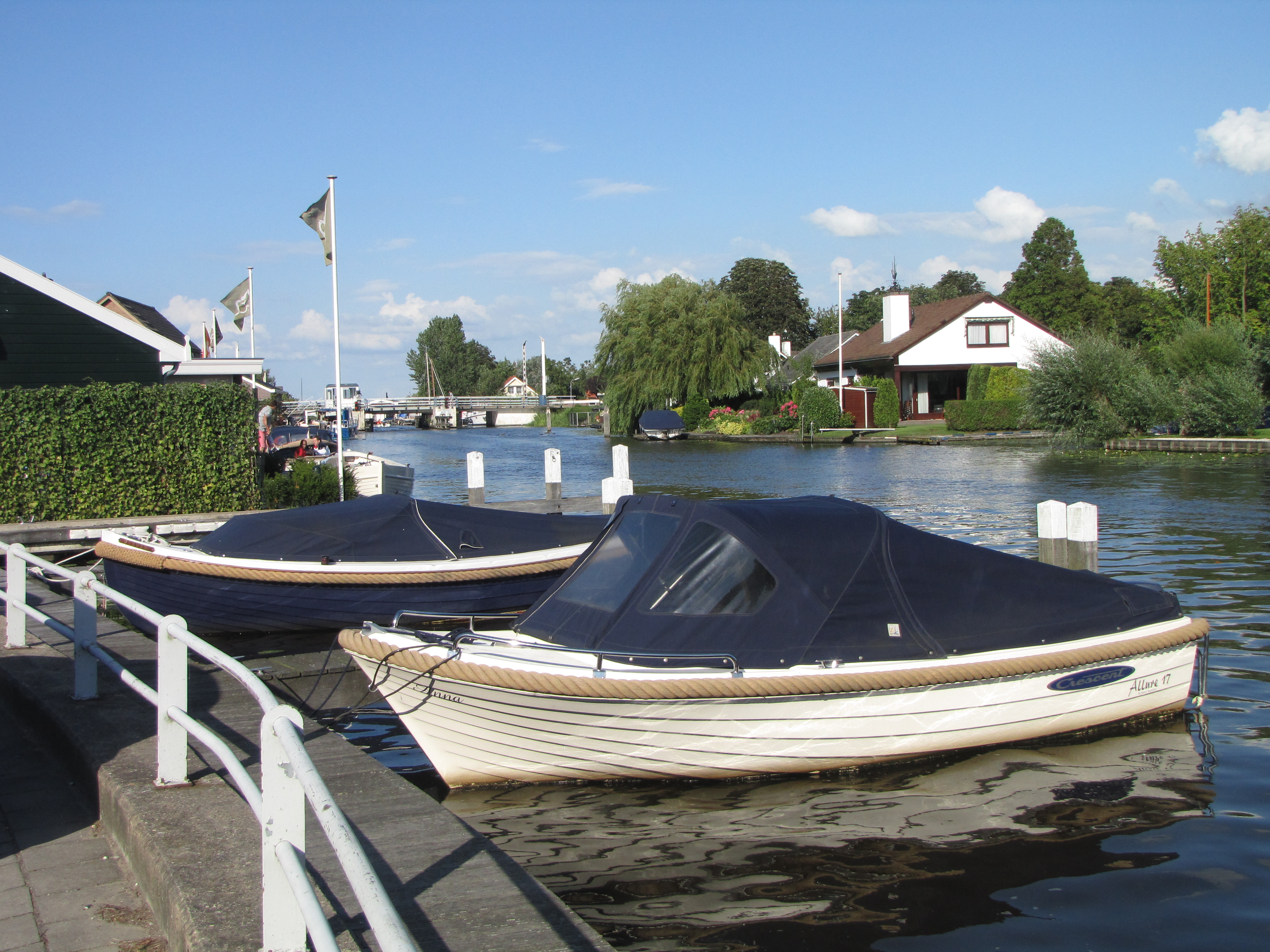
Canal view

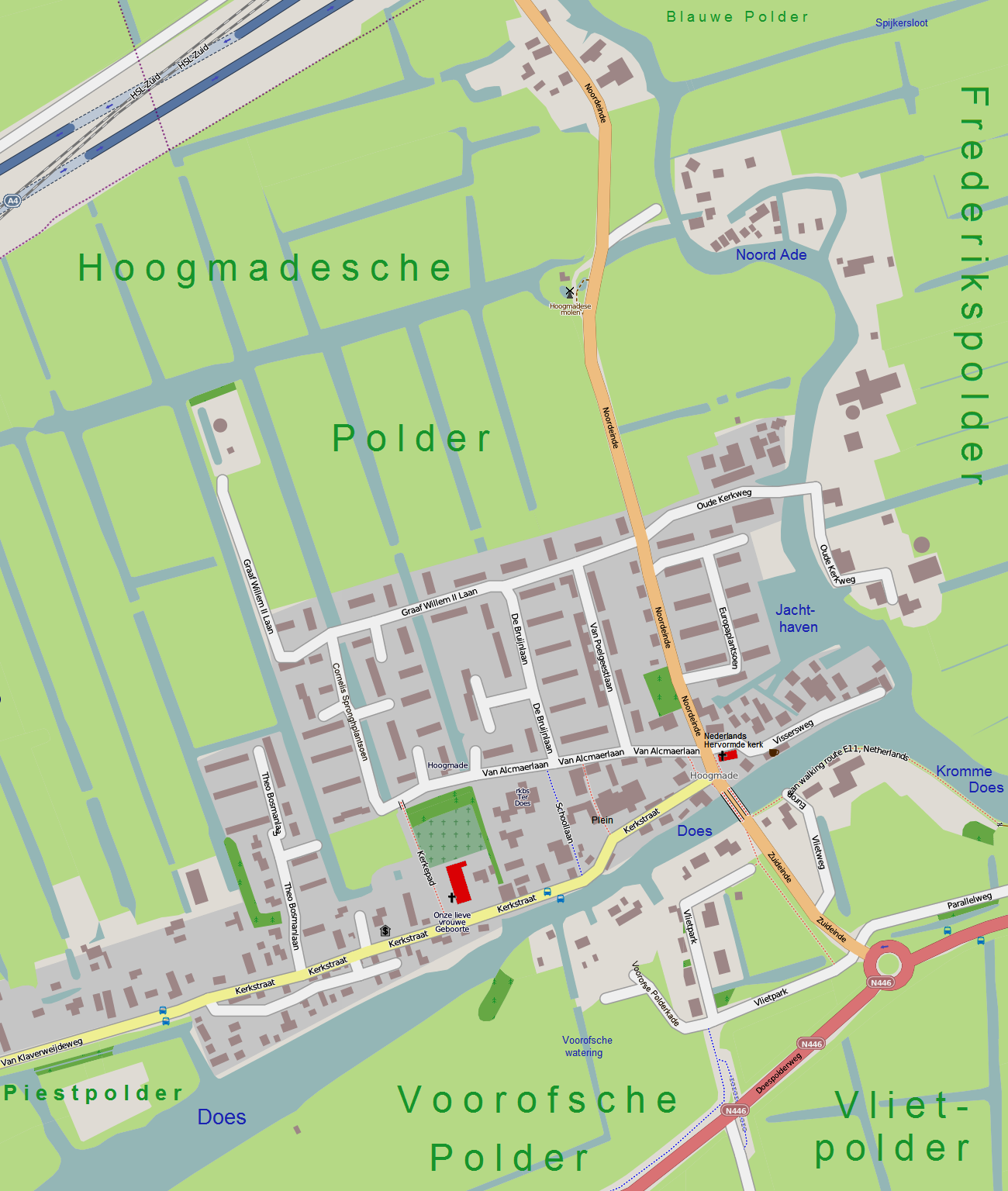
Map of Hoogmade

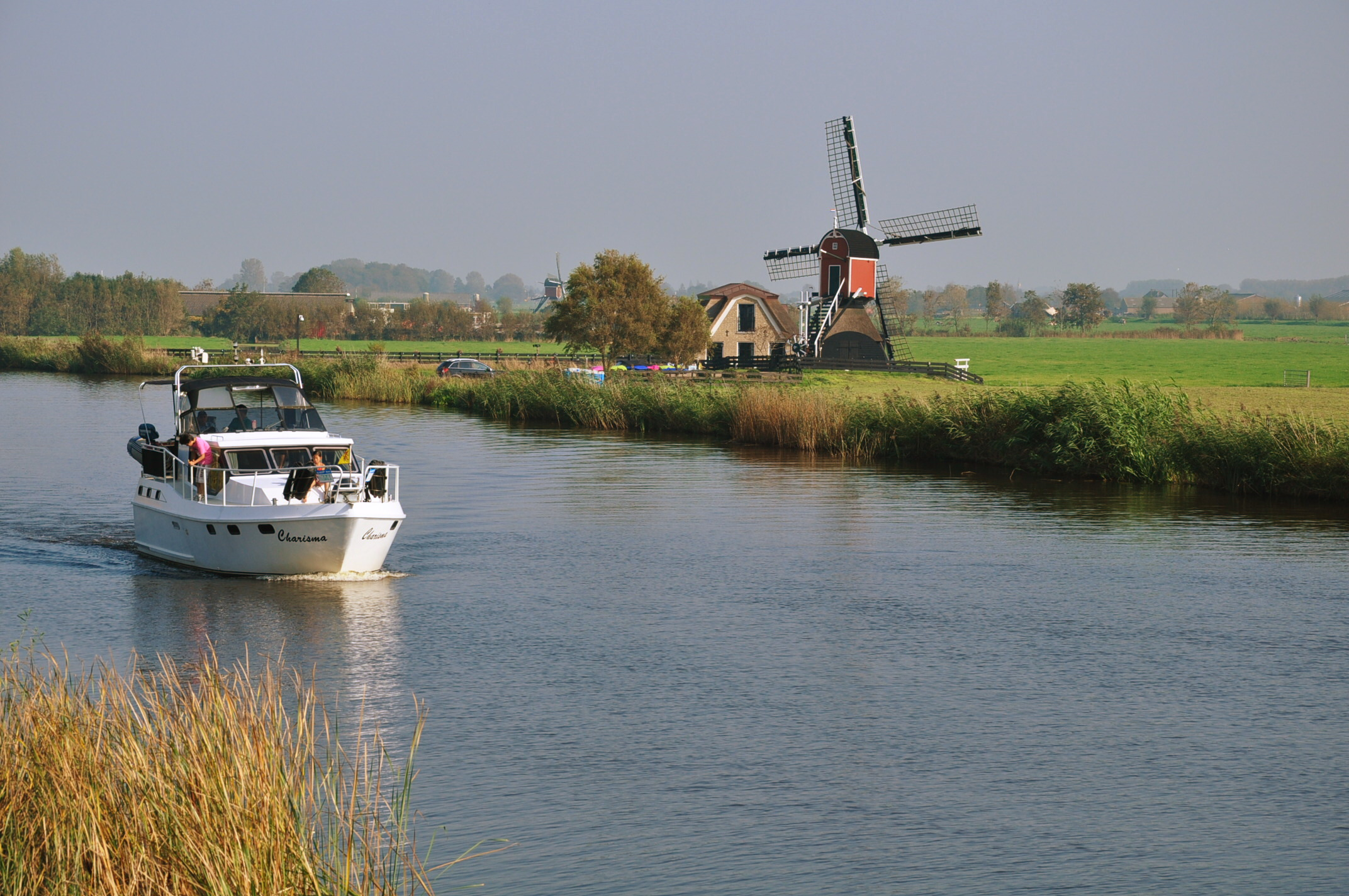
The Does waterway, close to Hoogmade

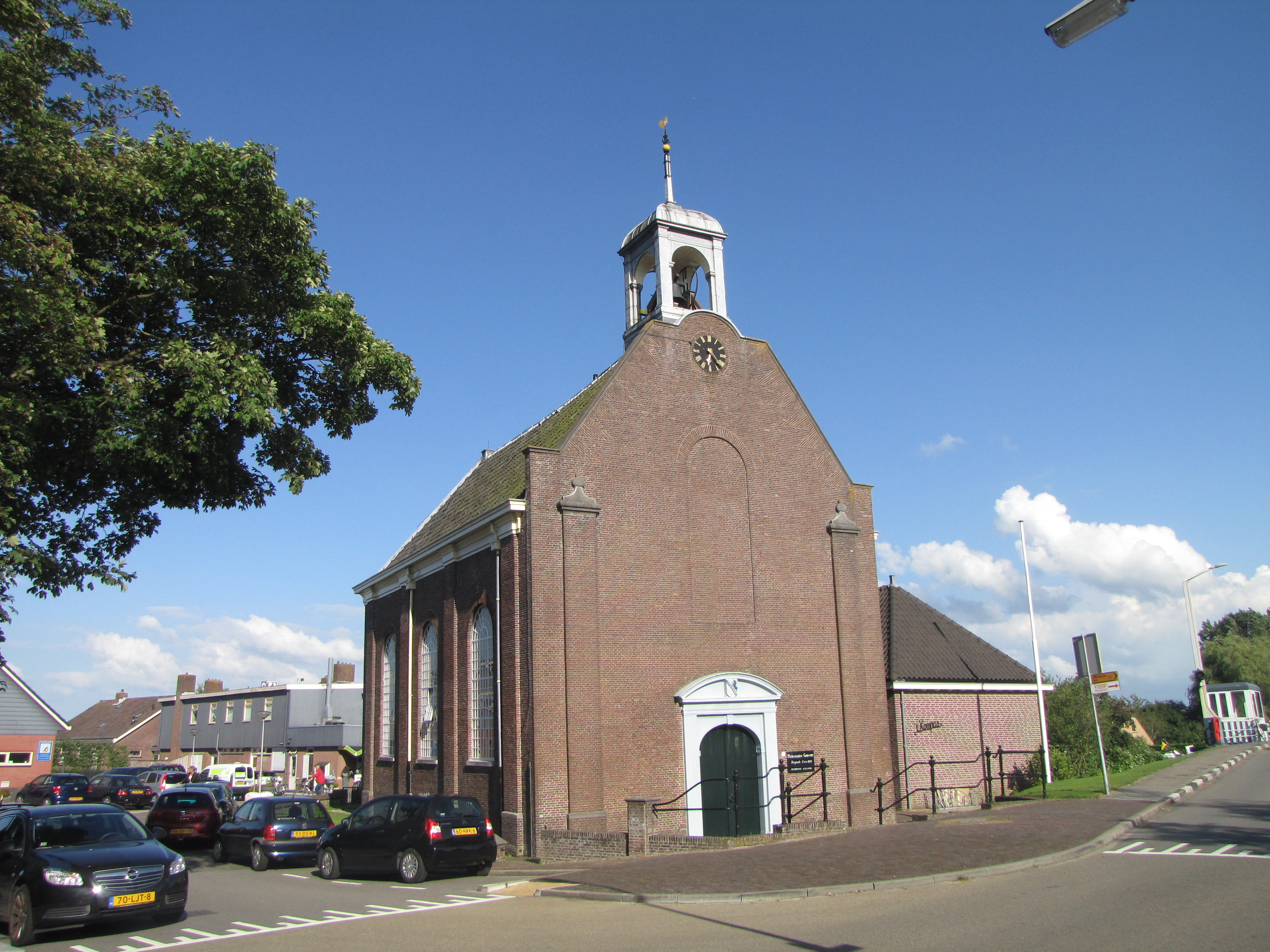
Dutch Reformed church

== Notable people ==
- Loek Hartog (born 2002), Racing driver
