= Oud Ade =

- Village
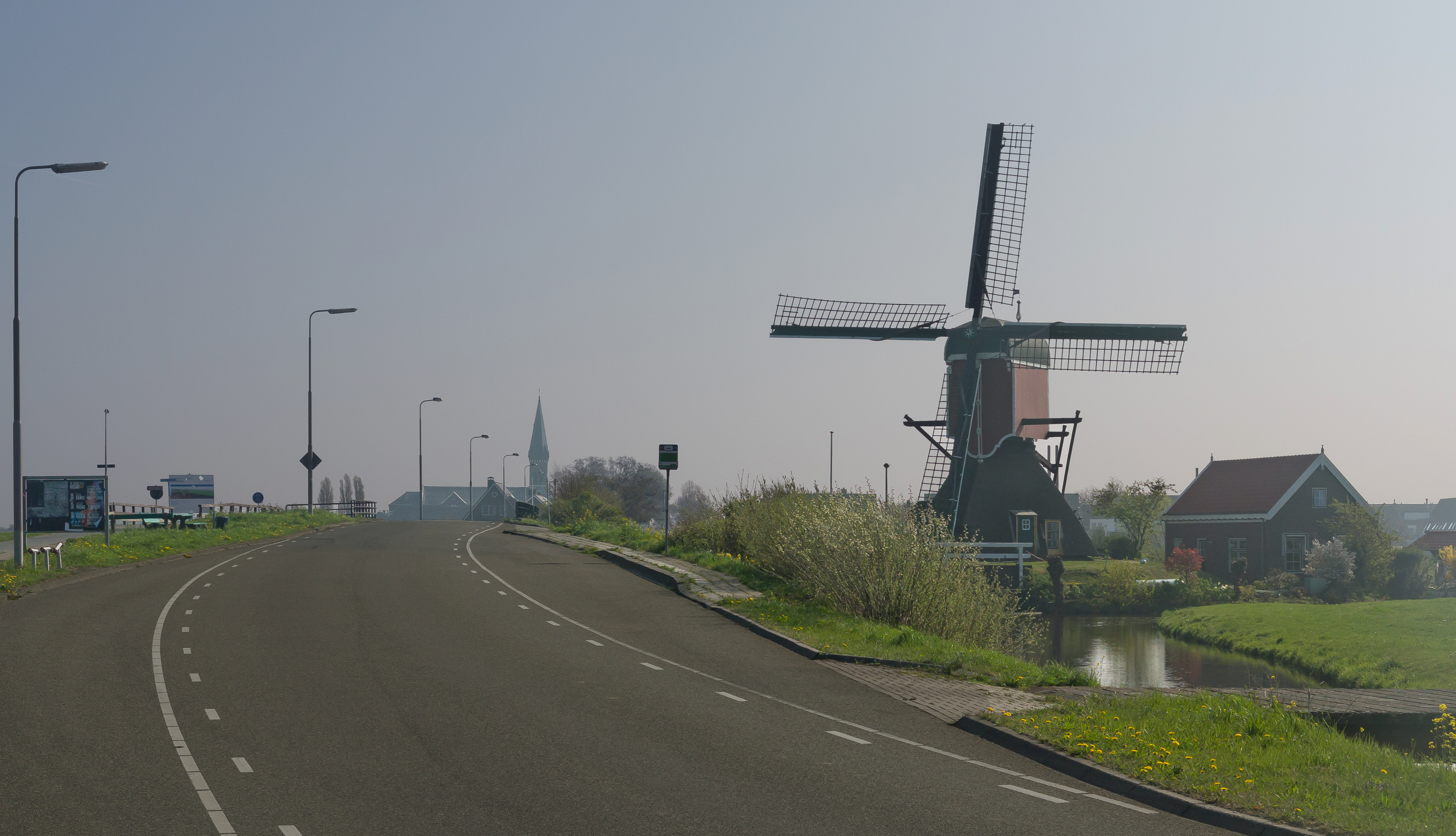
- Windmill (de Vrouw Vennemolen) with catholic church in the background

- Location in the province of South Holland in the Netherlands Location in the Netherlands
- Coordinates: 52°11′N 4°34′E
- Country: Netherlands
- Province: South Holland
- Municipality: Kaag en Braassem

Area
  - Total: 1.63 km^{2} (0.63 sq mi)
- Elevation: −1.9 m (−6.2 ft)

Population (2021)
  - Total: 560
  - Density: 340/km^{2} (890/sq mi)
- Time zone: UTC+1 (CET)
  - Summer (DST): UTC+2 (CEST)
- Postal code: 2374
- Dialing code: 071

Oud Ade (also: Oud-Ade) is a village in the Dutch province of South Holland. It is a part of the municipality of Kaag en Braassem, and lies about 7 km east of Leiden.

The village was first mentioned in 1395 or 1396 "Ecclesia de A". The current name means "the old river". Oud Ade developed as a peat excavation settlement, but remained a small linear settlement. It developed into the village in the 1960s by the addition of planned neighbourhoods. The Catholic St Bavo Church was built in 1868.

== Gallery ==
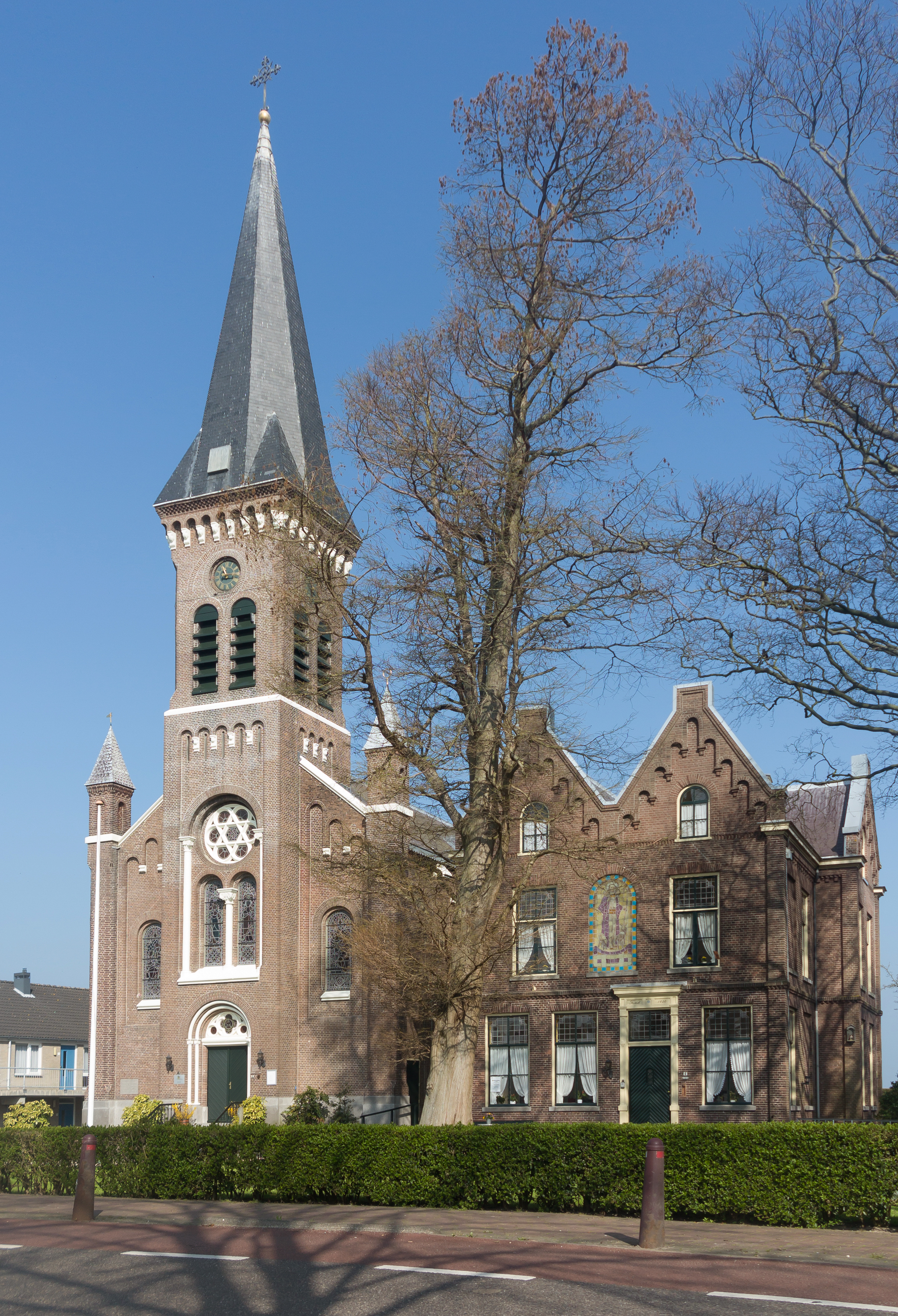
Catholic church and presbytery

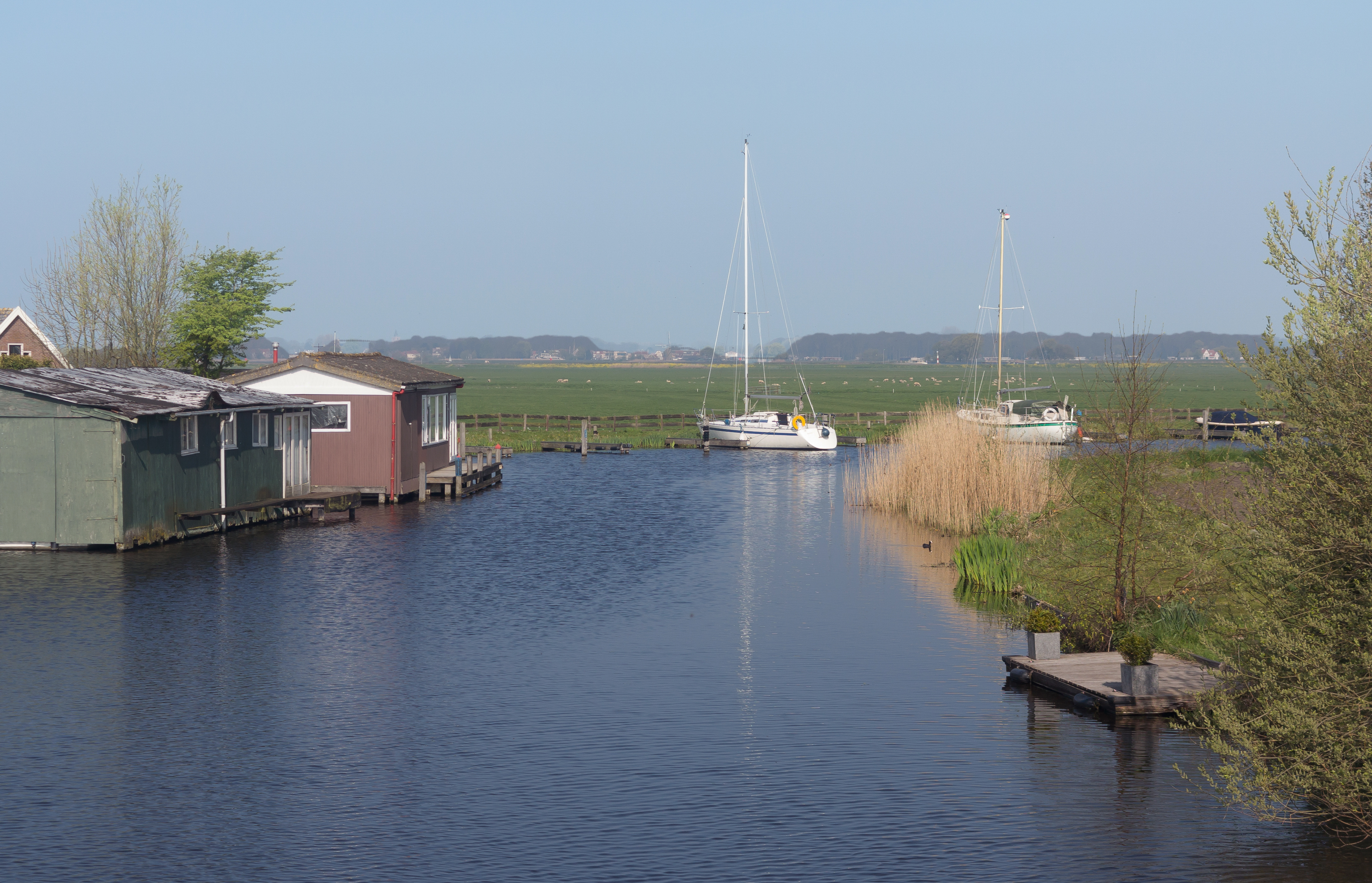
Panorama between Oud Ade and Warmond
