= Roelofarendsveen =

- Town
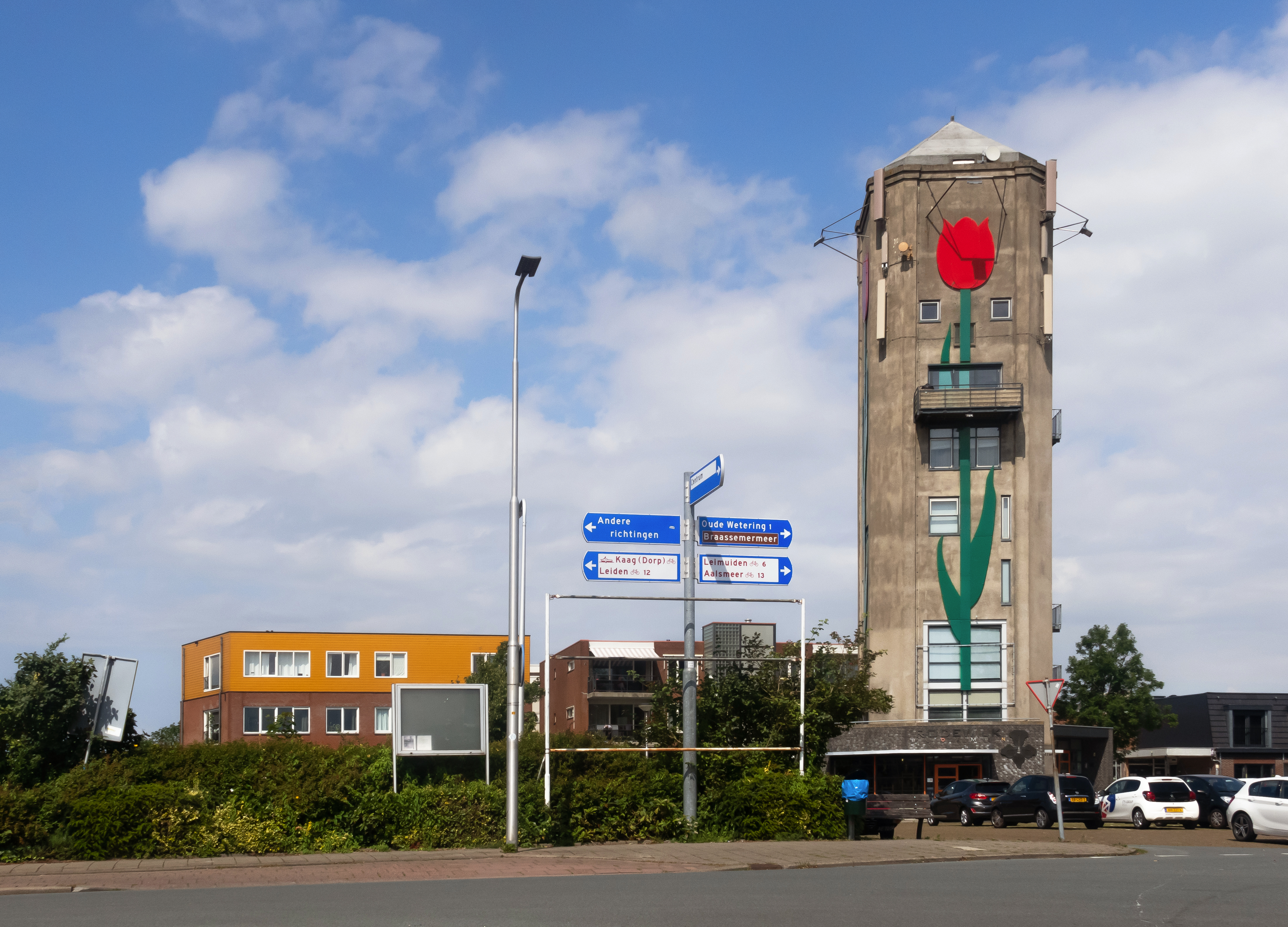
- Water tower

- Location in the province of South Holland in the Netherlands Location in the Netherlands
- Coordinates: 52°12′N 4°38′E
- Country: Netherlands
- Province: South Holland
- Municipality: Kaag en Braassem

Area
  - Total: 7.76 km^{2} (3.00 sq mi)
- Elevation: −0.9 m (−3.0 ft)

Population (2021)
  - Total: 10,070
  - Density: 1,300/km^{2} (3,360/sq mi)
- Time zone: UTC+1 (CET)
  - Summer (DST): UTC+2 (CEST)
- Postal code: 2371
- Dialing code: 071
- Major roads: A4

Roelofarendsveen (Dutch pronunciation: [ruloːˌfaːrəntsˈfeːn]) is a town in the west of the Netherlands. It is located in the municipality of Kaag en Braassem, South Holland, about 10 km east of Leiden.

== History ==
The village was first mentioned in 1575 as "Roelifaerts Veen", and means "bog of Roelof Aertszoon" who was probably the peat concession holder. Roelofarendsveen is a road village which developed along the bank of the Braassemermeer. Later it developed into a horticulture centre.

The polder mill Googermolen was built in 1717. It might have been rebuilt in 1830s. It was definitely restored in 1839. In 1956, a pumping station was added, and the wind mill now operates on a voluntary basis. The Catholic St Petrus' Banden Church is an aisleless church with detached tower built between 1969 and 1970 as a replacement of the 1856 church.

Roelofarendsveen was home to 1,205 people in 1840. After World War II, the town Roelofarendsveen and the village Oude Wetering have merged to form one built-up area.

== Gallery ==
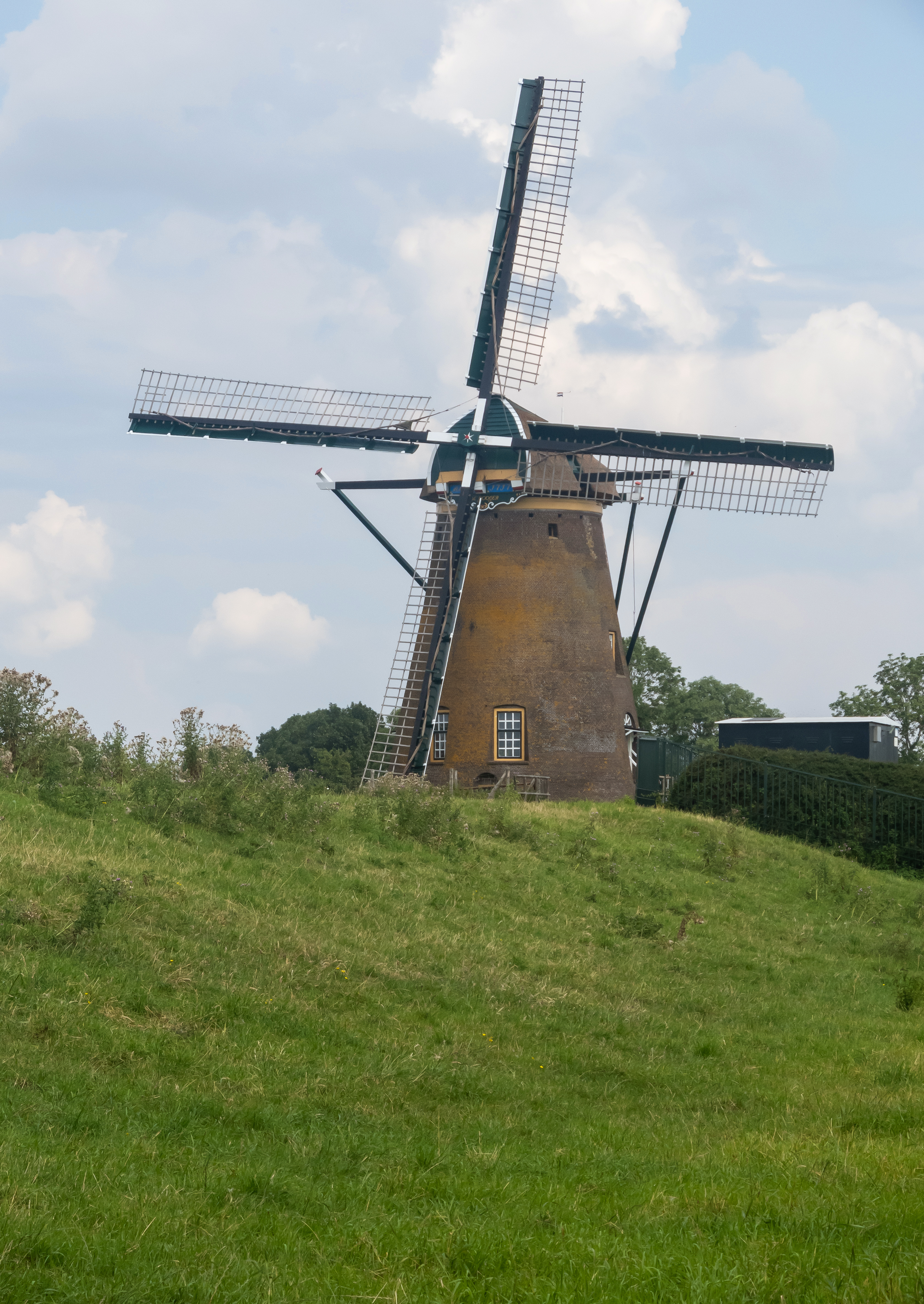
Roelofarendsveen, windmill

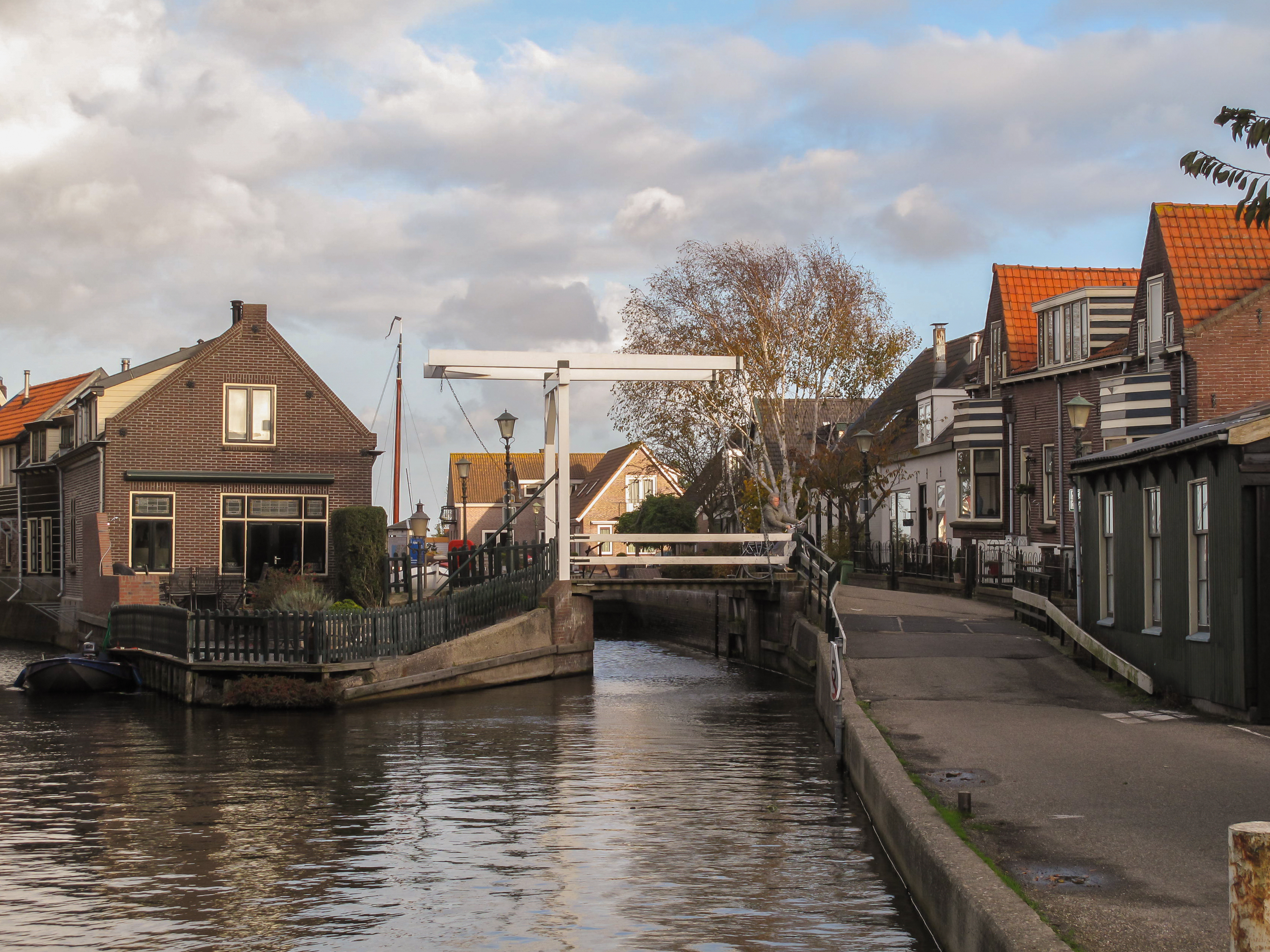
Roelofarendsveen, small bridge in the street

== Notable people ==
- Femke Heemskerk, international swimmer, gold medallist in the 100m freestyle event at the 2014 World Short Course Championships
