= List of cities, towns and villages in South Holland =

This is a list of settlements in the province of South Holland, in the Netherlands.

Name	Municipality	Coordinates	Notes
Aardam	Nieuwkoop	52°9′57″N 4°42′00″E	Former hamlet.
Aarlanderveen	Alphen aan den Rijn	52°08′25″N 4°43′40″E	
Abbenbroek	Nissewaard	51°50′55″N 4°14′35″E	
Abtswoude	Delft	51°58′45″N 4°21′20″E	
Achterbroek	Krimpenerwaard	51°58′00″N 4°41′55″E	
Achter-Lindt	Zwijndrecht	51°49′10″N 4°34′55″E	
Achthoven	Leiderdorp	52°08′00″N 4°33′00″E	Former hamlet. (VUGA 1997)
Achthuizen	Goeree-Overflakkee	51°41′15″N 4°16′45″E	
Achttienhoven	Nieuwkoop	52°08′50″N 4°51′25″E	
Alblasserdam	Alblasserdam	51°52′00″N 4°39′40″E	
Alphen aan den Rijn	Alphen aan den Rijn	52°08′05″N 4°39′35″E	
Ammerstol	Krimpenerwaard	51°55′40″N 4°48′30″E	
Arkel	Giessenlanden	51°51′50″N 4°59′40″E	
Arnoud	Hillegom	52°16′40″N 4°34′15″E	
Baakwoning	Westland	52°00′20″N 4°11′20″E	
Baanhoek	Sliedrecht	51°49′30″N 4°44′35″E	
Barendrecht	Barendrecht	51°51′25″N 4°32′05″E	
Barendrechtse Veer	Barendrecht	51°50′10″N 4°31′45″E	
Battenoord	Goeree-Overflakkee	51°42′25″N 4°07′45″E	
Beerenplaat	Nissewaard	51°50′00″N 4°23′45″E	
Benedenberg	Krimpenerwaard	51°56′15″N 4°45′30″E	
Beneden-Haastrecht	Krimpenerwaard	52°00′05″N 4°45′15″E	
Benedenheul	Krimpenerwaard	51°57′25″N 4°43′55″E	
Benedenkerk	Krimpenerwaard	51°58′05″N 4°45′15″E	
Bent	Alphen aan den Rijn	52°06′20″N 4°33′25″E	
Benthuizen	Alphen aan den Rijn	52°04′40″N 4°32′40″E	
Bergambacht	Krimpenerwaard	51°56′05″N 4°47′10″E	
Bergschenhoek	Lansingerland	51°59′25″N 4°29′55″E	
Bergstoep	Krimpenerwaard	51°55′20″N 4°47′05″E	
Berkel	Lansingerland	51°59′00″N 4°29′00″E	Now part of Berkel en Rodenrijs
Berkel en Rodenrijs	Lansingerland	51°59′30″N 4°28′20″E	
Berkenwoude	Krimpenerwaard	51°56′40″N 4°42′25″E	
Biert	Nissewaard	51°50′15″N 4°17′10″E	
Bilderdam	Kaag en Braassem	52°12′45″N 4°43′30″E	
Blaaksedijk	Hoeksche Waard	51°48′55″N 4°30′40″E	
Blaker	Westland	51°58′55″N 4°16′15″E	
Bleiswijk	Lansingerland	52°00′40″N 4°31′55″E	
Bleskensgraaf	Molenwaard	51°52′20″N 4°47′00″E	
Bloemendaal	Gouda	52°03′00″N 4°41′00″E	Former village; now part of Gouda
Blokland	Nieuwkoop	52°12′45″N 4°47′00″E	
Bodegraven	Bodegraven-Reeuwijk	52°04′55″N 4°45′00″E	
Bolnes	Ridderkerk	51°53′45″N 4°34′45″E	
Bommelskous	Hoeksche Waard	51°45′55″N 4°24′35″E	
Bonrepas	Krimpenerwaard	51°57′50″N 4°50′40″E	
Boskoop	Alphen aan den Rijn	52°04′30″N 4°39′20″E	
Bovenberg	Krimpenerwaard	51°57′20″N 4°49′40″E	
Boven-Haastrecht	Krimpenerwaard	52°00′30″N 4°47′40″E	
Boven-Hardinxveld	Hardinxveld-Giessendam	51°49′25″N 4°52′55″E	
Bovenkerk	Krimpenerwaard	51°58′30″N 4°47′15″E	
Brandwijk	Molenwaard	51°53′25″N 4°48′50″E	
Brielle	Voorne aan Zee	51°54′05″N 4°09′45″E	
Burgersdijk	Westland	51°58′05″N 4°15′40″E	
Capelle aan den IJssel	Capelle aan den IJssel	51°55′45″N 4°34′40″E	
Carnisse	Barendrecht	51°51′00″N 4°31′00″E	(VUGA 1997)
Cillaarshoek	Hoeksche Waard	51°46′25″N 4°32′50″E	
Dalem	Gorinchem	51°49′40″N 5°00′35″E	
De Donk	Molenwaard	51°53′35″N 4°47′15″E	
De Driesprong	Westland	52°00′45″N 4°15′00″E	
De Engel	Lisse	52°14′30″N 4°32′15″E	
De Hem	Krimpenerwaard	51°56′35″N 4°49′50″E	
De Hoek	Krimpenerwaard	51°55′00″N 4°45′00″E	Former hamlet. (VUGA 1997)
De Hoek	Nissewaard	51°51′00″N 4°18′00″E	(VUGA 1997)
De Klei	Noordwijk	52°13′15″N 4°26′25″E	
De Klem	Hoeksche Waard	51°44′00″N 4°30′50″E	
De Kooi	Gorinchem	51°51′40″N 4°56′50″E	
Delfgauw	Pijnacker-Nootdorp	52°00′25″N 4°23′45″E	
Delft	Delft	52°00′25″N 4°21′20″E	
De Lier	Westland	51°58′30″N 4°14′55″E	
Den Bommel	Goeree-Overflakkee	51°42′55″N 4°17′05″E	
Den Deijl	Wassenaar	52°08′15″N 4°24′45″E	
Den Dool	Giessenlanden	51°54′40″N 4°57′35″E	
Den Haag (The Hague)	Den Haag (The Hague)	52°04′35″N 4°17′55″E	
Den Hoorn	Zoetermeer	52°03′00″N 4°31′00″E	Former hamlet. (VUGA 1997)
Den Hoorn	Midden-Delfland	52°00′10″N 4°20′00″E	
De Pan	Katwijk	52°10′20″N 4°24′00″E	
De Roemer	Alphen aan den Rijn	52°05′05″N 4°37′55″E	
De Rotte	Lansingerland	51°58′10″N 4°32′05″E	
De Wacht	Hoeksche Waard	51°45′05″N 4°37′30″E	
De Zilk	Noordwijkerhout	52°18′10″N 4°32′40″E	
Dirksland	Goeree-Overflakkee	51°44′55″N 4°06′00″E	
Dordrecht	Dordrecht	51°48′35″N 4°40′25″E	
Driebruggen	Bodegraven-Reeuwijk	52°02′40″N 4°48′00″E	
Dubbeldam	Dordrecht	51°47′00″N 4°44′00″E	Former village; now a neighbourhood of Dordrecht.
Gaag	Midden-Delfland	51°57′20″N 4°17′20″E	
Geervliet	Nissewaard	51°51′40″N 4°15′40″E	
Gelderswoude	Zoeterwoude	52°05′30″N 4°31′50″E	
Gelkenes	Molenwaard	51°56′20″N 4°50′35″E	
Giessenburg	Giessenlanden	51°51′05″N 4°53′25″E	
Giessendam	Hardinxveld-Giessendam	51°49′25″N 4°48′55″E	
Giessen-Oudekerk	Giessenlanden	51°50′40″N 4°52′00″E	
Gijbeland	Molenwaard	51°52′45″N 4°49′20″E	
Gnephoek	Alphen aan den Rijn	52°08′25″N 4°37′40″E	
Goedereede	Goeree-Overflakkee	51°49′05″N 3°58′50″E	
Goidschalxoord	Hoeksche Waard	51°49′35″N 4°27′40″E	
Gooland	Pijnacker-Nootdorp	52°03′10″N 4°23′35″E	
Gorinchem	Gorinchem	51°50′00″N 4°58′30″E	
Gouda	Gouda	52°01′00″N 4°42′30″E	
Gouderak	Krimpenerwaard	51°59′05″N 4°40′40″E	
Goudriaan	Molenwaard	51°54′10″N 4°54′00″E	
Goudseweg	Krimpenerwaard	51°59′00″N 4°45′45″E	
Goudswaard	Hoeksche Waard	51°47′40″N 4°16′35″E	
Graafland	Molenwaard	51°55′30″N 4°51′20″E	
's-Gravendeel	Hoeksche Waard	51°46′45″N 4°37′00″E	
's-Gravenweg	Zuidplas	51°57′35″N 4°37′15″E	
's-Gravenzande	Westland	52°00′05″N 4°09′55″E	
Greup	Hoeksche Waard	51°47′15″N 4°26′10″E	
Groenendijk	Alphen aan den Rijn	52°07′50″N 4°33′35″E	
Groeneweg	Rotterdam	51°59′05″N 4°35′50″E	
Groot-Ammers	Molenwaard	51°55′25″N 4°49′25″E	
Groot Hitland	Zuidplas	51°56′15″N 4°37′50″E	
Haagoord	Den Haag (The Hague)	52°03′35″N 4°24′15″E	
't Haantje	Rijswijk (SH)	52°01′15″N 4°20′30″E	
Haastrecht	Krimpenerwaard	52°00′05″N 4°46′30″E	
Halfweg	Lisse	52°16′40″N 4°32′10″E	
Havenhoofd	Goeree-Overflakkee	51°49′50″N 4°00′20″E	
Hazerswoude-Dorp	Alphen aan den Rijn	52°05′50″N 4°35′10″E	
Hazerswoude-Rijndijk	Alphen aan den Rijn	52°07′40″N 4°35′30″E	
Heenvliet	Nissewaard	51°51′55″N 4°14′35″E	
Heenweg	Westland	51°58′55″N 4°10′50″E	
Heerjansdam	Zwijndrecht	51°50′10″N 4°33′50″E	
Heijplaat	Rotterdam	51°53′35″N 4°25′15″E	
Heimansbuurt	Alphen aan den Rijn	52°09′40″N 4°38′25″E	
Heinenoord	Hoeksche Waard	51°49′35″N 4°28′45″E	
Hekelingen	Nissewaard	51°49′35″N 4°20′40″E	
Helhoek	Voorne aan Zee	51°53′55″N 4°05′30″E	
Hellevoetsluis	Voorne aan Zee	51°50′05″N 4°08′50″E	
Hendrik-Ido-Ambacht	Hendrik-Ido-Ambacht	51°50′40″N 4°38′20″E	
Herkingen	Goeree-Overflakkee	51°42′35″N 4°05′15″E	
Het Beijersche	Krimpenerwaard	51°59′05″N 4°43′55″E	
Hillegom	Hillegom	52°17′25″N 4°35′00″E	
Hitsertse Kade	Hoeksche Waard	51°44′25″N 4°21′50″E	
Hodenpijl	Midden-Delfland	51°59′05″N 4°19′15″E	
Hogebrug	Bodegraven-Reeuwijk	52°01′35″N 4°48′15″E	
Hogeveen	Alphen aan den Rijn	52°04′40″N 4°34′50″E	
Hollevoeterbrug	Zuidplas	52°02′30″N 4°33′45″E	
Hoogblokland	Giessenlanden	51°52′30″N 4°58′35″E	
Hoogmade	Kaag en Braassem	52°10′10″N 4°34′55″E	
Hoogvliet	Rotterdam	51°51′45″N 4°21′45″E	
Hook of Holland	Rotterdam	51°58′40″N 4°08′00″E	
Hoorn	Alphen aan den Rijn	52°08′05″N 4°37′30″E	
Hoornaar	Giessenlanden	51°52′45″N 4°56′50″E	
IJssellaan	Krimpenerwaard	51°58′05″N 4°38′00″E	
IJzerenbrug	Voorne aan Zee	51°50′35″N 4°10′15″E	
Kaag	Kaag en Braassem	52°12′50″N 4°33′25″E	
Kadijk	Krimpenerwaard	51°56′35″N 4°47′00″E	
Kandelaar	Rotterdam	51°57′25″N 4°23′55″E	
Katwijk aan den Rijn	Katwijk	52°11′40″N 4°25′20″E	Now part of Katwijk
Katwijk aan Zee	Katwijk	52°12′10″N 4°23′55″E	Now part of Katwijk
Katwijkerlaan	Pijnacker-Nootdorp	52°02′05″N 4°27′00″E	
Keizersdijk	Hoeksche Waard	51°45′25″N 4°32′50″E	
Kerkbuurt	Schiedam	51°56′40″N 4°23′10″E	
Kijfhoek	Zwijndrecht	51°49′30″N 4°35′45″E	
Kinderdijk	Molenwaard	51°53′10″N 4°37′55″E	
Klaaswaal	Hoeksche Waard	51°46′15″N 4°26′45″E	
Klein-Delfgauw	Delft, Pijnacker-Nootdorp	52°01′10″N 4°23′15″E	
Kleine-Lindt	Zwijndrecht	51°49′40″N 4°34′25″E	
Klein Hitland	Zuidplas	51°57′30″N 4°38′25″E	
Klinkenberg	Teylingen	52°12′20″N 4°29′40″E	
Koedood	Barendrecht, Albrandswaard	51°50′40″N 4°29′25″E	
Kooiwijk	Molenwaard	51°51′55″N 4°41′40″E	
Koolwijk	Krimpenerwaard	51°57′30″N 4°46′00″E	
Kop van 't Land	Dordrecht	51°47′20″N 4°45′25″E	
Kortenoord	Zuidplas	51°58′05″N 4°37′45″E	
Korteraar	Nieuwkoop	52°10′25″N 4°43′55″E	
Kortland	Alblasserdam	51°52′00″N 4°41′15″E	
Koudekerk aan den Rijn	Alphen aan den Rijn	52°08′00″N 4°36′05″E	
Kralingse Veer	Rotterdam	51°54′45″N 4°33′10″E	
Kranendijk	Goeree-Overflakkee	51°40′55″N 4°15′25″E	
Krimpen aan de Lek	Krimpenerwaard	51°53′40″N 4°37′45″E	
Krimpen aan den IJssel	Krimpen aan den IJssel	51°55′00″N 4°36′10″E	
Kruiningergors	Voorne aan Zee	51°55′15″N 4°07′10″E	
Kruisweg	Lansingerland	52°02′40″N 4°32′40″E	
Kuipersveer	Hoeksche Waard	51°49′25″N 4°33′10″E	
Kwintsheul	Westland	52°00′45″N 4°15′20″E	
Lage Weg	Krimpenerwaard	51°57′55″N 4°38′25″E	
Langeraar	Nieuwkoop	52°11′35″N 4°42′40″E	
Langerak	Molenwaard	51°55′55″N 4°52′35″E	
Langeweide	Bodegraven-Reeuwijk	52°02′20″N 4°47′40″E	
Langstraat	Goeree-Overflakkee	51°40′30″N 4°16′45″E	
Leiden	Leiden	52°09′30″N 4°29′35″E	
Leiderdorp	Leiderdorp	52°09′30″N 4°31′45″E	
Leidschendam	Leidschendam-Voorburg	52°05′15″N 4°23′40″E	
Leimuiden	Kaag en Braassem	52°13′25″N 4°40′10″E	
Lekkerkerk	Krimpenerwaard	51°53′55″N 4°40′55″E	
Lierhand	Westland	51°59′10″N 4°16′50″E	
Liesveld	Molenwaard	51°55′56″N 4°49′57″E	
Lisse	Lisse	52°15′35″N 4°33′25″E	
Loete	Alphen aan den Rijn	52°05′20″N 4°38′20″E	
Maaldrift	Wassenaar	52°09′05″N 4°25′40″E	
Maasdam	Hoeksche Waard	51°47′20″N 4°33′20″E	
Maasdijk	Westland	51°57′30″N 4°12′50″E	
Maasdijk	Hoeksche Waard	51°47′25″N 4°28′20″E	
Maasland	Midden-Delfland	51°56′05″N 4°16′20″E	
Maassluis	Maassluis	51°55′25″N 4°15′00″E	
Mariëndijk	Westland	52°00′40″N 4°14′15″E	
Matena	Papendrecht	51°49′45″N 4°43′50″E	
Meije	Bodegraven-Reeuwijk, Nieuwkoop, Woerden	52°07′15″N 4°47′35″E	
Melissant	Goeree-Overflakkee	51°46′15″N 4°04′15″E	
Middelburg	Bodegraven-Reeuwijk	52°03′25″N 4°40′55″E	
Middelharnis	Goeree-Overflakkee	51°45′30″N 4°09′55″E	
Middelsluis	Hoeksche Waard	51°44′35″N 4°26′30″E	
Mijnsheerenland	Hoeksche Waard	51°47′50″N 4°29′15″E	
Minkeloos	Giessenlanden	51°53′35″N 4°58′20″E	
Moerkapelle	Zuidplas	52°02′40″N 4°34′30″E	
's-Molenaarsbuurt	Alphen aan den Rijn	52°08′40″N 4°38′40″E	
Molenaarsgraaf	Molenwaard	51°52′30″N 4°49′30″E	
Monster	Westland	52°01′35″N 4°10′30″E	
Mookhoek	Hoeksche Waard	51°45′10″N 4°35′40″E	
Moordrecht	Zuidplas	51°59′10″N 4°40′05″E	
Naaldwijk	Westland	51°59′40″N 4°12′35″E	
Neder-Hardinxveld	Hardinxveld-Giessendam	51°49′35″N 4°50′15″E	
Negenhuizen	Midden-Delfland	51°57′40″N 4°19′40″E	
Nieuw-Beijerland	Hoeksche Waard	51°48′45″N 4°20′35″E	
Nieuwendijk	Hoeksche Waard	51°45′15″N 4°19′05″E	
Nieuwenhoorn	Voorne aan Zee	51°51′15″N 4°08′35″E	
Nieuwerbrug	Bodegraven-Reeuwijk	52°04′40″N 4°48′50″E	
Nieuwerkerk aan den IJssel	Zuidplas	51°58′05″N 4°36′35″E	
Nieuwe-Tonge	Goeree-Overflakkee	51°42′55″N 4°09′55″E	
Nieuwe Tuinen	Westland	51°58′30″N 4°14′05″E	
Nieuwe Wetering	Kaag en Braassem	52°12′25″N 4°37′05″E	
Nieuwkoop	Nieuwkoop	52°09′05″N 4°46′35″E	
Nieuw-Lekkerland	Molenwaard	51°53′20″N 4°40′45″E	
Nieuwpoort	Molenwaard	51°56′10″N 4°52′05″E	
Nieuwveen	Nieuwkoop	52°11′50″N 4°45′25″E	
Noordeinde	Lansingerland	52°01′00″N 4°29′00″E	
Noordeinde	Nieuwkoop	52°11′35″N 4°46′25″E	
Noordeloos	Giessenlanden	51°54′15″N 4°56′30″E	
Noorden	Nieuwkoop	52°10′00″N 4°49′40″E	
Noordsebuurt	Nieuwkoop	52°10′15″N 4°51′15″E	
Noordse Dorp	Nieuwkoop	52°10′10″N 4°50′20″E	
Noordwijk aan Zee	Noordwijk	52°14′35″N 4°26′05″E	
Noordwijk-Binnen	Noordwijk	52°14′10″N 4°26′50″E	
Noordwijkerhout	Noordwijkerhout	52°15′40″N 4°29′35″E	
Noordzijde	Bodegraven-Reeuwijk	52°04′55″N 4°46′25″E	
Nootdorp	Pijnacker-Nootdorp	52°02′40″N 4°23′45″E	
Noukoop	Pijnacker-Nootdorp	52°02′10″N 4°25′35″E	
Numansdorp	Hoeksche Waard	51°43′55″N 4°26′15″E	
Oegstgeest	Oegstgeest	52°10′50″N 4°28′10″E	
Ofwegen	Kaag en Braassem	52°09′55″N 4°36′15″E	
Ooltgensplaat	Goeree-Overflakkee	51°41′00″N 4°20′45″E	
Oostbuurt	Westland	51°58′45″N 4°16′40″E	
Oostdijk	Goeree-Overflakkee	51°49′40″N 3°57′40″E	
Oosteind	Papendrecht	51°49′45″N 4°43′25″E	
Oosteinde	Teylingen	52°12′45″N 4°30′50″E	
Oostendam	Ridderkerk	51°51′10″N 4°38′05″E	
Oosthoek	Hoeksche Waard	51°48′00″N 4°20′15″E	
Oostvoorne	Voorne aan Zee	51°54′45″N 4°05′55″E	
Opperduit	Krimpenerwaard	51°53′55″N 4°42′45″E	
Ottoland	Molenwaard	51°53′35″N 4°52′15″E	
Oud-Ade	Kaag en Braassem	52°11′25″N 4°33′55″E	
Oud-Alblas	Molenwaard	51°51′30″N 4°42′20″E	
Oud-Beijerland	Hoeksche Waard	51°49′25″N 4°24′45″E	
Oud-Bodegraven	Bodegraven-Reeuwijk	52°04′40″N 4°44′05″E	
Ouddorp	Goeree-Overflakkee	51°48′45″N 3°56′05″E	
Oudeland	Krimpenerwaard	51°55′50″N 4°40′45″E	
Oude Leede	Pijnacker-Nootdorp	51°59′15″N 4°25′20″E	
Oude-Molen	Ridderkerk	51°51′35″N 4°38′15″E	
Oudendijk	Hoeksche Waard	51°46′25″N 4°29′15″E	
Oudendijk	Hoeksche Waard	51°46′20″N 4°16′25″E	
Oudenhoorn	Voorne aan Zee	51°49′40″N 4°11′30″E	
Ouderkerk aan den IJssel	Krimpenerwaard	51°56′05″N 4°38′10″E	
Oudesluis	Hoeksche Waard	51°45′35″N 4°26′40″E	
Oude-Tonge	Goeree-Overflakkee	51°41′30″N 4°12′50″E	
Oude Wetering	Kaag en Braassem	52°12′50″N 4°38′40″E	
Oud-Reeuwijk	Bodegraven-Reeuwijk	52°03′30″N 4°42′55″E	
Oud Verlaat	Rotterdam	51°58′45″N 4°33′10″E	
Oukoop	Bodegraven-Reeuwijk	52°02′05″N 4°46′20″E	(VUGA 1997)
Overslingeland	Giessenlanden	51°52′55″N 4°55′30″E	
Papendrecht	Papendrecht	51°49′55″N 4°41′15″E	
Papenveer	Nieuwkoop	52°11′05″N 4°43′30″E	
Park Leeuwenbergh	Leidschendam-Voorburg	52°03′30″N 4°21′25″E	
Pernis	Rotterdam	51°53′20″N 4°23′20″E	
Piershil	Hoeksche Waard	51°47′35″N 4°18′50″E	
Pijnacker	Pijnacker-Nootdorp	52°01′00″N 4°26′15″E	
Pinkenveer	Giessenlanden	51°52′05″N 4°54′30″E	
Platteweg	Bodegraven-Reeuwijk	52°01′30″N 4°44′20″E	
Poeldijk	Westland	52°01′30″N 4°13′10″E	
Poortugaal	Albrandswaard	51°51′30″N 4°23′40″E	
Puttershoek	Hoeksche Waard	51°48′20″N 4°34′05″E	
Randenburg	Bodegraven-Reeuwijk	52°03′45″N 4°40′15″E	
Reedijk	Hoeksche Waard	51°49′00″N 4°27′45″E	
Reeuwijk	Bodegraven-Reeuwijk	52°02′45″N 4°43′30″E	
Reeuwijk-Dorp	Bodegraven-Reeuwijk	52°03′20″N 4°41′25″E	
Rhoon	Albrandswaard	51°51′25″N 4°25′20″E	
Ridderbuurt	Alphen aan den Rijn	52°09′15″N 4°40′35″E	
Ridderkerk	Ridderkerk	51°52′20″N 4°36′10″E	
Rietveld	Alphen aan den Rijn	52°06′05″N 4°37′40″E	
Rietveld	Giessenlanden	51°51′35″N 5°00′50″E	
Rijnsaterwoude	Kaag en Braassem	52°11′45″N 4°40′15″E	
Rijnsburg	Katwijk	52°11′25″N 4°26′30″E	Now part of Katwijk
Rijpwetering	Kaag en Braassem	52°11′35″N 4°35′00″E	
Rijsoord	Ridderkerk	51°51′00″N 4°35′45″E	
Rijswijk	Rijswijk (SH)	52°02′40″N 4°19′40″E	
Rockanje	Voorne aan Zee	51°52′20″N 4°04′15″E	
Roeleveen	Zoetermeer	52°03′20″N 4°25′05″E	
Roelofarendsveen	Kaag en Braassem	52°12′10″N 4°38′00″E	
Rolpaal	Westland	52°00′45″N 4°13′00″E	
Rotterdam	Rotterdam	51°55′20″N 4°28′45″E	
Rozenburg	Rotterdam	51°54′15″N 4°14′55″E	
Rozendaal	Krimpenerwaard	52°00′55″N 4°50′25″E	
Ruigenhoek	Noordwijkerhout	52°17′30″N 4°31′35″E	
Sassenheim	Teylingen	52°13′30″N 4°31′20″E	
Schelluinen	Giessenlanden	51°50′35″N 4°55′35″E	
Schenkeldijk	Hoeksche Waard	51°44′35″N 4°23′00″E	
Schenkeldijk	Hoeksche Waard	51°44′30″N 4°36′10″E	
Schiedam	Schiedam	51°55′10″N 4°23′20″E	
Schipluiden	Midden-Delfland	51°58′35″N 4°18′50″E	
Schoonhoven	Krimpenerwaard	51°56′50″N 4°50′55″E	
Schoonouwen	Krimpenerwaard	51°57′50″N 4°47′30″E	
Schuring	Hoeksche Waard	51°43′45″N 4°29′05″E	
Schuwacht	Krimpenerwaard	51°53′35″N 4°38′50″E	
Simonshaven	Nissewaard	51°49′20″N 4°17′20″E	
Sint Anthoniepolder	Hoeksche Waard	51°47′55″N 4°31′55″E	
Sion	Rijswijk (SH)	52°00′50″N 4°19′30″E	
Sliedrecht	Sliedrecht	51°49′15″N 4°46′35″E	
Slikkendam	Nieuwkoop	52°09′20″N 4°51′25″E	
Sluipwijk	Bodegraven-Reeuwijk	52°02′20″N 4°44′30″E	
Sommelsdijk	Goeree-Overflakkee	51°45′25″N 4°08′55″E	
Spijkenisse	Nissewaard	51°50′40″N 4°19′45″E	
Spoelwijk	Alphen aan den Rijn	52°05′00″N 4°41′45″E	
Stad aan 't Haringvliet	Goeree-Overflakkee	51°44′20″N 4°14′30″E	
Steenplaats	Hoeksche Waard	51°43′55″N 4°34′15″E	
Stein	Krimpenerwaard	52°00′15″N 4°46′55″E	
Stellendam	Goeree-Overflakkee	51°48′20″N 4°01′30″E	
Stolwijk	Krimpenerwaard	51°58′20″N 4°46′25″E	
Stolwijkersluis	Gouda, Krimpenerwaard	52°00′20″N 4°43′15″E	
Stompwijk	Leidschendam-Voorburg	52°05′40″N 4°28′15″E	
Stormpolder	Krimpen aan den IJssel	51°54′45″N 4°34′25″E	
Streefkerk	Molenwaard	51°54′00″N 4°44′35″E	
Strijen	Hoeksche Waard	52°38′30″N 4°32′05″E	
Strijensas	Hoeksche Waard	51°42′55″N 4°35′10″E	
Strijp	Rijswijk (SH)	52°01′50″N 4°18′05″E	
Strype	Voorne aan Zee	51°53′25″N 4°05′15″E	
Stuifakker	Voorne aan Zee	51°53′05″N 4°03′45″E	
Teijlingen	Teylingen	52°13′55″N 4°31′15″E	
Tempel	Bodegraven-Reeuwijk	52°04′05″N 4°42′15″E	
Ter Aar	Nieuwkoop	52°09′55″N 4°42′25″E	
Terbregge	Rotterdam	51°57′20″N 4°31′05″E	
Ter Heijde	Westland	52°01′50″N 4°10′05″E	
Ter Lucht	Midden-Delfland	51°55′35″N 4°16′20″E	
Tiengemeten	Hoeksche Waard	51°44′30″N 4°19′05″E	
Tinte	Voorne aan Zee	51°53′15″N 4°08′10″E	
Tussenlanen	Krimpenerwaard	51°56′25″N 4°48′15″E	
Tweede Tol	Dordrecht	51°46′00″N 4°38′40″E	
Tweede Vlotbrug	Nissewaard	51°51′10″N 4°11′50″E	
Valkenburg	Katwijk	52°10′50″N 4°25′55″E	Now part of Katwijk.
Vierpolders	Voorne aan Zee	51°52′45″N 4°10′45″E	
Visschershoek	Goeree-Overflakkee	51°48′00″N 3°52′10″E	
Vlaardingen	Vlaardingen	51°54′45″N 4°20′30″E	
Vlieland	Pijnacker-Nootdorp	52°01′45″N 4°26′05″E	
Vlist	Krimpenerwaard	51°58′50″N 4°49′10″E	
Vlotbrug	Voorne aan Zee	51°50′10″N 4°08′55″E	
Voorburg	Leidschendam-Voorburg	52°04′25″N 4°21′35″E	
Voorhout	Teylingen	52°13′20″N 4°29′05″E	
Voorschoten	Voorschoten	52°07′40″N 4°26′55″E	
Voorweg	Alphen aan den Rijn	52°05′20″N 4°37′15″E	
Vriezekoop	Kaag en Braassem	52°13′15″N 4°41′55″E	
Vuilendam	Molenwaard	51°52′30″N 4°50′55″E	
Vuurbaken	Hoeksche Waard	51°47′15″N 4°23′40″E	
Waal	Molenwaard	51°56′20″N 4°53′55″E	
Waarder	Bodegraven-Reeuwijk	52°03′40″N 4°49′15″E	
Waddinxveen	Waddinxveen	52°02′40″N 4°39′05″E	
Warmond	Teylingen	52°11′50″N 4°30′10″E	
Wassenaar	Wassenaar	52°08′45″N 4°24′10″E	
Wateringen	Westland	52°01′25″N 4°16′15″E	
Weijland	Bodegraven-Reeuwijk	52°05′05″N 4°47′55″E	
Weijpoort	Bodegraven-Reeuwijk	52°04′55″N 4°48′10″E	
Weipoort	Zoeterwoude	52°06′50″N 4°31′25″E	
Westdijk	Hoeksche Waard	51°47′45″N 4°28′20″E	
Westeinde	Alphen aan den Rijn	52°05′45″N 4°33′30″E	
Westeinde	Zoeterwoude	52°06′40″N 4°28′50″E	
Westerlee	Westland	51°58′25″N 4°13′15″E	
Westmaas	Hoeksche Waard	51°47′10″N 4°28′30″E	
Wevershoek	Ridderkerk	51°51′20″N 4°34′30″E	
Wieldrecht	Dordrecht	51°47′05″N 4°37′55″E	
Wijngaarden	Molenwaard	51°50′45″N 4°45′45″E	
Willemsdorp	Dordrecht	51°43′50″N 4°37′50″E	
Wilsveen	Leidschendam-Voorburg	52°04′30″N 4°25′30″E	
Windas	Schiedam	51°56′15″N 4°23′10″E	
Woerdense Verlaat	Nieuwkoop	52°09′20″N 4°51′50″E	
Woubrugge	Kaag en Braassem	52°10′10″N 4°38′10″E	
't Woudt	Midden-Delfland	51°59′45″N 4°17′35″E	
Zevenhoven	Nieuwkoop	52°10′55″N 4°46′45″E	
Zevenhuizen	Zuidplas	52°00′40″N 4°34′55″E	
Zevenhuizen	Kaag en Braassem	52°11′50″N 4°33′25″E	
Zinkweg	Hoeksche Waard	51°48′10″N 4°23′25″E	
Zoetermeer	Zoetermeer	52°03′25″N 4°29′35″E	
Zoeterwoude-Dorp	Zoeterwoude	52°07′15″N 4°29′45″E	
Zoeterwoude-Rijndijk	Zoeterwoude	52°08′30″N 4°31′35″E	
Zouteveen	Midden-Delfland	51°57′05″N 4°19′30″E	
Zuid-Beijerland	Hoeksche Waard	51°45′05″N 4°22′05″E	
Zuidbroek	Krimpenerwaard	51°56′10″N 4°43′55″E	
Zuidbuurt	Zoeterwoude	52°06′30″N 4°30′15″E	
Zuideinde	Nieuwkoop	52°08′00″N 4°45′50″E	
Zuidland	Nissewaard	51°49′20″N 4°15′35″E	
Zuidzijde	Bodegraven-Reeuwijk	52°04′50″N 4°46′20″E	
Zuidzijde	Goeree-Overflakkee	51°42′05″N 4°15′30″E	
Zuidzijde	Hoeksche Waard	51°46′55″N 4°21′55″E	
Zwaantje	Ridderkerk	51°51′25″N 4°34′05″E	
Zwammerdam	Alphen aan den Rijn	52°06′20″N 4°43′35″E	
Zwanegat	Hoeksche Waard	51°47′25″N 4°31′00″E	
Zwartewaal	Voorne aan Zee	51°53′00″N 4°13′15″E	
Zwartsluisje	Hoeksche Waard	51°46′20″N 4°19′40″E	
Zwet	Ridderkerk	51°51′55″N 4°33′35″E	
Zweth	Rotterdam	51°57′40″N 4°23′40″E	
Zwijndrecht	Zwijndrecht	51°49′05″N 4°38′00″E	

== Sources ==
GEOnet Names Server (GNS)
