= Pieter van Reede van Oudtshoorn =

Dutch governor (1714–1773)

Baron Pieter van Reede van Oudtshoorn of Nederhorst
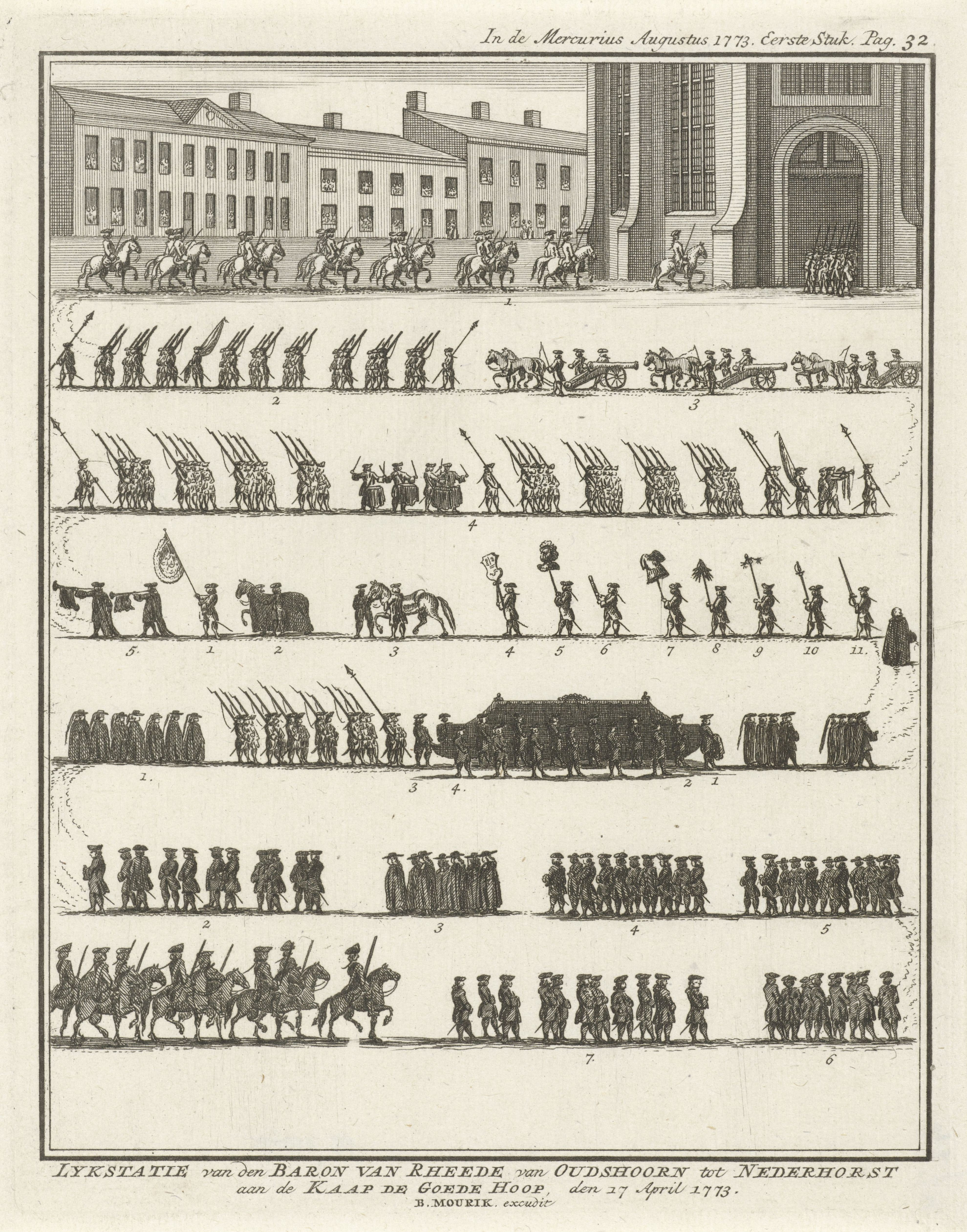
- The funeral of Baron van Rheede

10th Governor of the Dutch Cape Colony
- In office 1772 – 23 January 1773
- Preceded by: Joachim van Plettenberg (acting)
- Succeeded by: Joachim van Plettenberg

Personal details
- Born: 8 July 1714 Utrecht, the Netherlands
- Died: 23 January 1773 (aged 58) At sea
- Resting place: Groote Kerk, Cape Town, South Africa
- Spouse: Sophia Catharina Boesses

Baron Pieter van Reede (or van Rheede) van Oudtshoorn (8 July 1714 – 23 January 1773) was a senior official and Governor designate of the Dutch Cape Colony. He was appointed Governor of the Cape Colony in 1772 to succeed the deceased Governor Ryk Tulbagh but died at sea on his way to the Cape Colony to take up his post. The Western Cape town of Oudtshoorn is named after him. He is the progenitor of the van R(h)eede van Oudtshoorn family in South Africa.

== Career and death ==
De Hoog Edele Welgebore Gestrenge Heer De Heer Pieter Baron van Reede van Oudtshoorn tot Nederhorst Heer van Oudtshoorn Gnephoek Ridder Búúrt en Drakenburg Gouverneur en Directeur van Cabo de Goede Hoop Obiit op de reize herwaarts Aan boord van het Schip Asia Den XXIII Januarij MDCCLXXIII En is den XVII April Daeraen volgende Alhier begraven

— Gravestone inscription, Groote Kerk

Born the son of a nobleman in Utrecht, van Reede van Oudtshoorn first arrived in the Cape Colony aboard de Duijff as an employee of the Dutch East India Company in 1741.

In 1743 then Cape Governor Hendrik Swellengrebel granted him land in the Table Mountain valley named Garden Oudtshoorn, bounded by Hof Street and Kloof Street in the present-day suburb of Gardens. After van Reede van Oudtshoorn's death the developed estate was subdivided into three separate properties named La Belle Alliance, Trafalgar and Mount Nelson where the Mount Nelson Hotel stands today.

He was fiscal independent from September 1741 to September 1762, and Secunde (deputy Governor) of the Cape Colony from December 1760 to April 1766 after Ryk Tulbagh had succeeded Swellengrebel as Governor. He returned to the Netherlands in 1766, but left his children in the Cape, and bought the Drakensteyn castle. He was later re-appointed to the vacant Secunde position in the Cape Colony and in 1772, following the arrival of news of Tulbagh's death before he had departed for the Cape Colony, appointed as Tulbagh's successor. However, he became ill and died at sea aboard Asia on his voyage to take up his post as Governor. His body was transported to Cape Town in a coffin he had carried aboard on the same voyage. On 17 April 1773 he was given a state funeral in Cape Town and buried at the Groote Kerk. After the church building was enlarged in 1841, the stone that had covered his grave was attached to the church's eastern wall. A print depicting his funeral procession is preserved in the Atlas van Stolk museum in Rotterdam.

Baron Joachim van Plettenberg, who had been acting Governor since Tulbagh's death on 11 August 1771, was appointed Governor on 18 May 1774.

== Family Origins ==
"The van Rheedes are one of the old families of Europe, descending from Bitter Van Reede, mentioned between 1344 and 1372, who himself was probably descendent of Wernerus de Rethe, knight, mentioned between 1223 and 1236. Godard VAN Reede (10th generation) accompanied William III of Orange to England and became Earl of Athlone on 14th March 1691 (branch extinct 7 Jan 1897). Another branch, Van Reede de Parkeren en Aa, became extinct in 1879. The Van R(h)eede van Oudsthoorns are, therefore, the only surviving branch of the family, both in the Netherlands and in South Africa. Van Ooudsthoorn was added to the original surname of Van Reede because for a period they were squires of that village in Holland.

After the Napoleonic wars and the establishment of a monarchy in the Netherlands, the old nobility of the family, and the title of Baron, was confirmed by Royal Decrees of 2nd April and 14th June 1822."

== Family ==
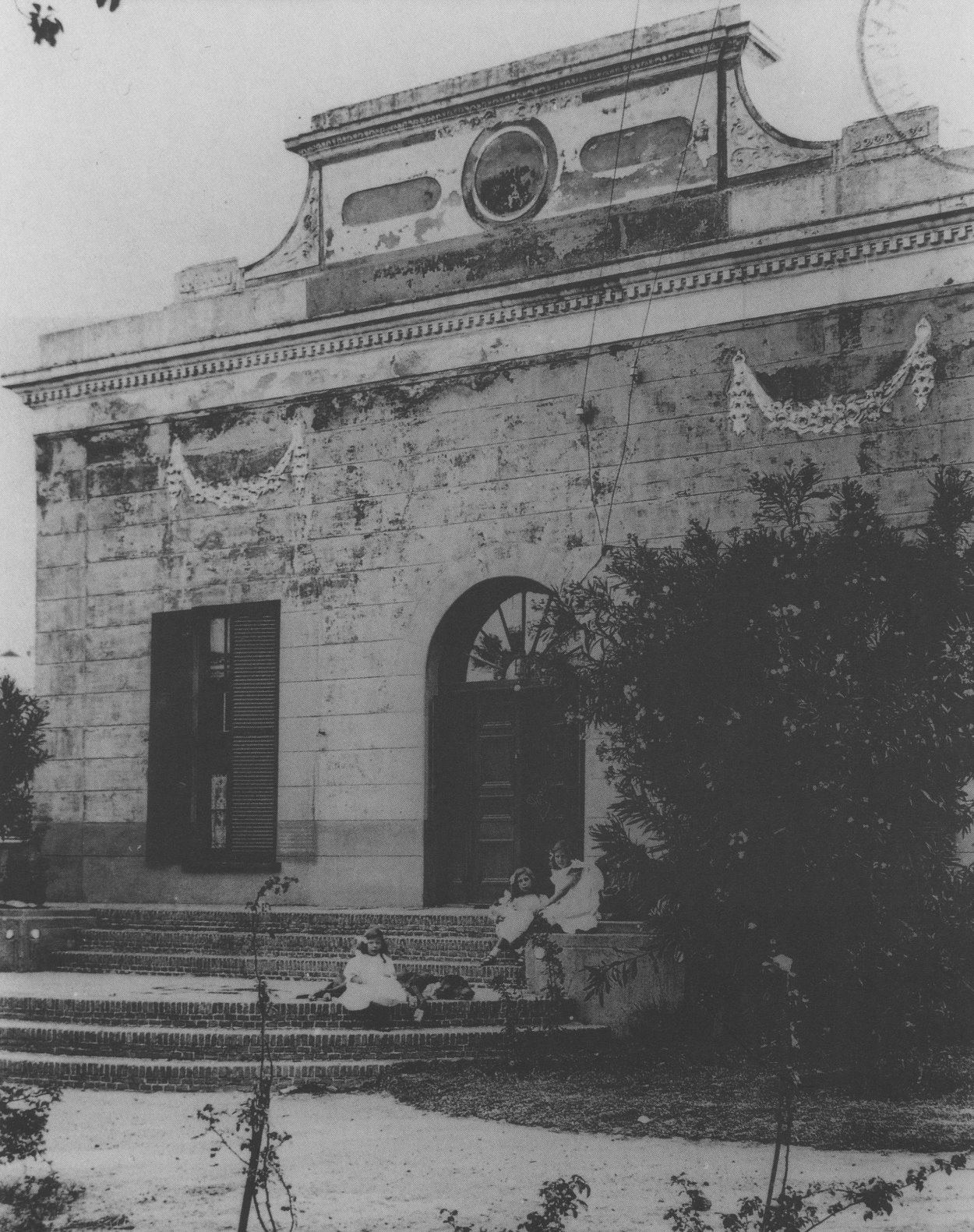
Saasveld House, originally built in Kloof Street on the Garden Oudtshoorn estate by Pieter's son William Ferdinand, was demolished and rebuilt in Franschhoek where it houses the Huguenot Memorial Museum.

Pieter was Lord of Oudshoorn, Ridderbuurt and Gnephoek, the only son of Barend Cornelis van Reede van Oudtshoorn (1690–1750) and his wife Catharina Cornelia van Eys. He was baptised in St Catherine's Cathedral, Utrecht on 10 July 1714. His father was the first to bear the surname van Reede van Oudtshoorn. Barend Cornelis was the only child of Pieter van Reede tot Nederhorst (1645–1692), Lord of Oudshoorn, Ridderbuurt and Gnephoek, and his wife Maria de Vlamingh van Outshoorn (1646–1732). Maria was the only child of Cornelis de Vlamingh van Outshoorn (1613–1688), Lord of Outshoorn and Gnephoek, and his wife Claesgen Hooft. The King of the Netherlands recognised the family's title of baron in 1822. Pieter was also the heir of William Ferdinand Carey, the 8th Baron Hunsdon, son of William Carey and Maria de Vlamingh van Outshoorn's sister Geertruida.

On 18 January 1741 in Den Bosch Pieter married Sophia Catharina Boesses, who was born to a military officer in 1720 in Bergen op Zoom, after living together since 1736. They departed for the Cape Colony on 7 May 1741. Some of their children settled in the Cape Colony, including their son William Ferdinand (1755–1822) who also worked for the Dutch East India Company. Following the British occupation the independently wealthy William Ferdinand, who had been a senior official of the Cape Colony before the occupation, refused to swear allegiance to the British Crown.

In 1782, Pieter's then 61-year-old widow was the subject of a scandal in the Cape Colony when she attempted unsuccessfully to withdraw her inheritance and elope with a 20-year-old soldier. She died in Cape Town in 1791.

== Oudtshoorn ==
In 1858, Ernestina Johanna Geesje, William Ferdinand's daughter and Pieter's granddaughter, married Egbertus Bergh, a magistrate of the Western Cape town of George. Bergh was one of the founding fathers of the Western Cape town of Oudtshoorn, which was named in honour of his wife's distinguished grandfather. The coat of arms of the local municipality is based on the Dutch family's coat of arms. Oudtshoorn is a twin town of Alphen aan den Rijn in the Netherlands which incorporates the historic Dutch villages of Oudshoorn, Ridderbuurt and Gnephoek.
