= Hoogeveen (disambiguation) =

Hoogeveen may refer to:

- Hoogeveen, a large town in Drenthe, the Netherlands
- Hoogeveen, Nootdorp, a former municipality in South Holland, the Netherlands
- Hogeveen or Hoogeveen, a hamlet and former municipality in South Holland, the Netherlands
