= Zuidzijde =

Zuidzijde (Dutch for "south side") is the name of several Dutch villages:

- Zuidzijde, Bodegraven-Reeuwijk
- Zuidzijde, Goeree-Overflakkee
- Zuidzijde, Hoeksche Waard
