= Koolwijk =

Koolwijk may refer to:

- Koolwijk, North Brabant, a village in the Netherlands; see Ravenstein, Netherlands
- Koolwijk, South Holland, a village in the Netherlands
- Ryan Koolwijk (born 1985), Dutch footballer

== See also ==
- Kooiwijk, a hamlet in Molenlanden, South Holland, Netherlands
- Kootwijk, Barneveld, Gelderland, Netherlands
