= Strype =

Strype may refer to:

- John Strype (1643–1737), English clergyman, historian and biographer
- Strype, Netherlands, village in the municipality of Westvoorne, the Netherlands
- The Strypes, Irish rock band
