= Oudesluis =

Oudesluis can refer to:

- Oudesluis, Hoeksche Waard, a hamlet in the Dutch province of South Holland, part of the municipality of Hoeksche Waard
- Oudesluis, Schagen, a village in the Dutch province of North Holland, part of the municipality of Schagen
