= Rietveld =

Rietveld, Dutch for field of reed, can refer to:

== People ==
- Gerrit Rietveld (1888–1964), Dutch designer and architect
- Hugo Rietveld (1932–2016), Dutch crystallographer who invented the Rietveld refinement method
- Kees Rietveld (born 1969), Dutch singer
- Pelle Rietveld (born 1985), Dutch decathlete
- Piet Rietveld (1952–2013), Dutch economist
- Wilhelmina Rietveld (1949–1973), Dutch-Canadian model

== Places ==
- Rietveld, Giessenlanden, a hamlet near Arkel, Netherlands
- Rietveld, Woerden, a hamlet in the municipality Woerden, Netherlands
- Rietveld, Rijnwoude, a hamlet near Hazerswoude, Netherlands
- Rietveld, Nord, a hamlet near Wormhout, Nord, France

== Other ==
- Rietveld refinement, a technique for use in the characterisation of crystalline materials
- Gerrit Rietveld Academie, a Dutch Academy of art and design
- Rietveld (software), a code review tool written by Guido van Rossum
