= Boven-Haastrecht =

- Town
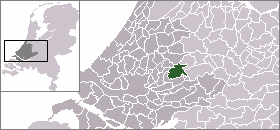

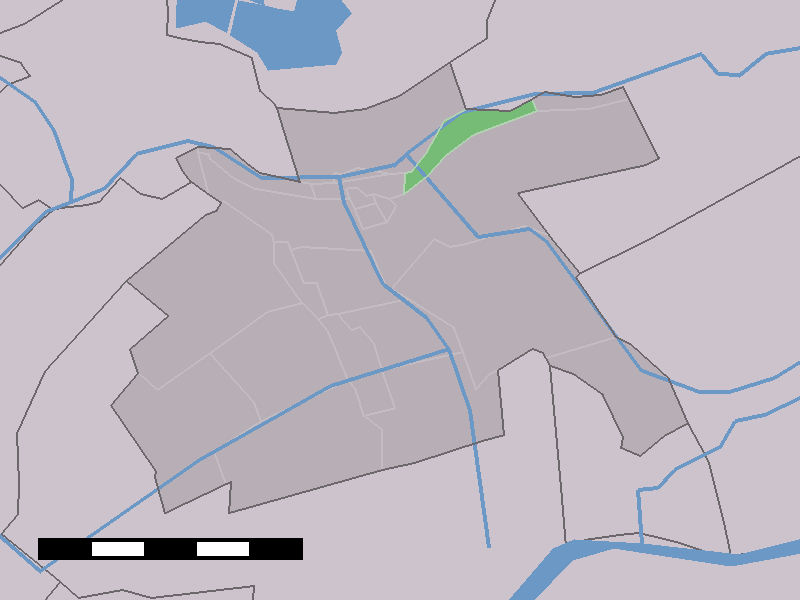
- The village (dark green) and the statistical district (light green) of Boven-Haastrecht in the former municipality of Vlist.
- Coordinates: 52°1′N 4°48′E
- Country: Netherlands
- Province: South Holland
- Municipality: Krimpenerwaard

Population (1 January 2005)
  - Total: 220
- Time zone: UTC+1 (CET)
  - Summer (DST): UTC+2 (CEST)

Boven-Haastrecht is a town in the Dutch province of South Holland, where it is a part of the municipality of Krimpenerwaard, about 6 km east of Gouda.

The statistical area of Boven-Haastrecht, including the surrounding countryside, has a population of around 220.

Boven-Haastrecht was part of Vlist until 2015.
