= Benedenkerk =

- Hamlet
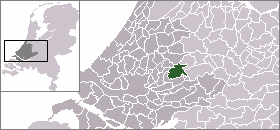

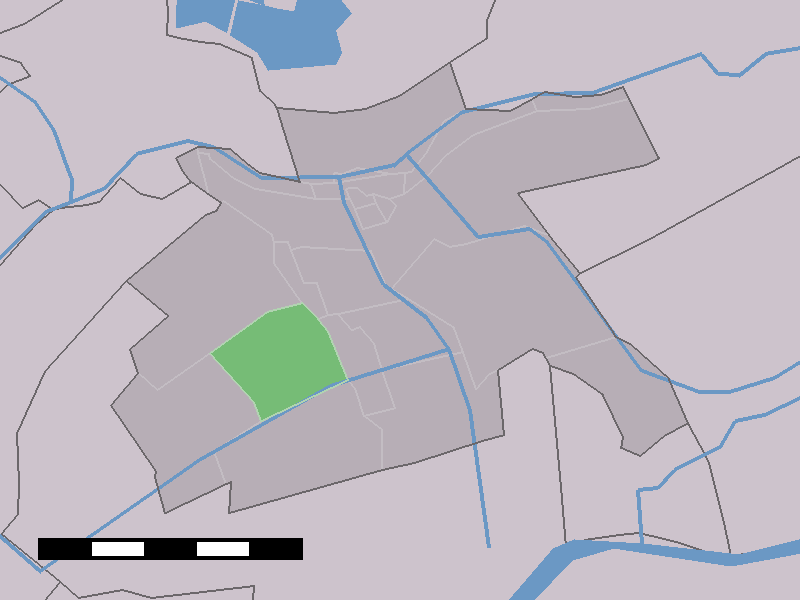
- The village (dark green) and the statistical district (light green) of Benedenkerk in the former municipality of Vlist.
- Coordinates: 51°57′56″N 4°45′15″E
- Country: Netherlands
- Province: South Holland
- Municipality: Krimpenerwaard
- Time zone: UTC+1 (CET)
  - Summer (DST): UTC+2 (CEST)

Benedenkerk is a town in the Dutch province of South Holland. It is a part of the municipality of Krimpenerwaard, and lies about 6 km south of Gouda.

The statistical area "Benedenkerk", which also can include the surrounding countryside, has a population of around 260.

Until 2015, Benedenkerk was part of Vlist.
