= Het Beijersche =

- Town
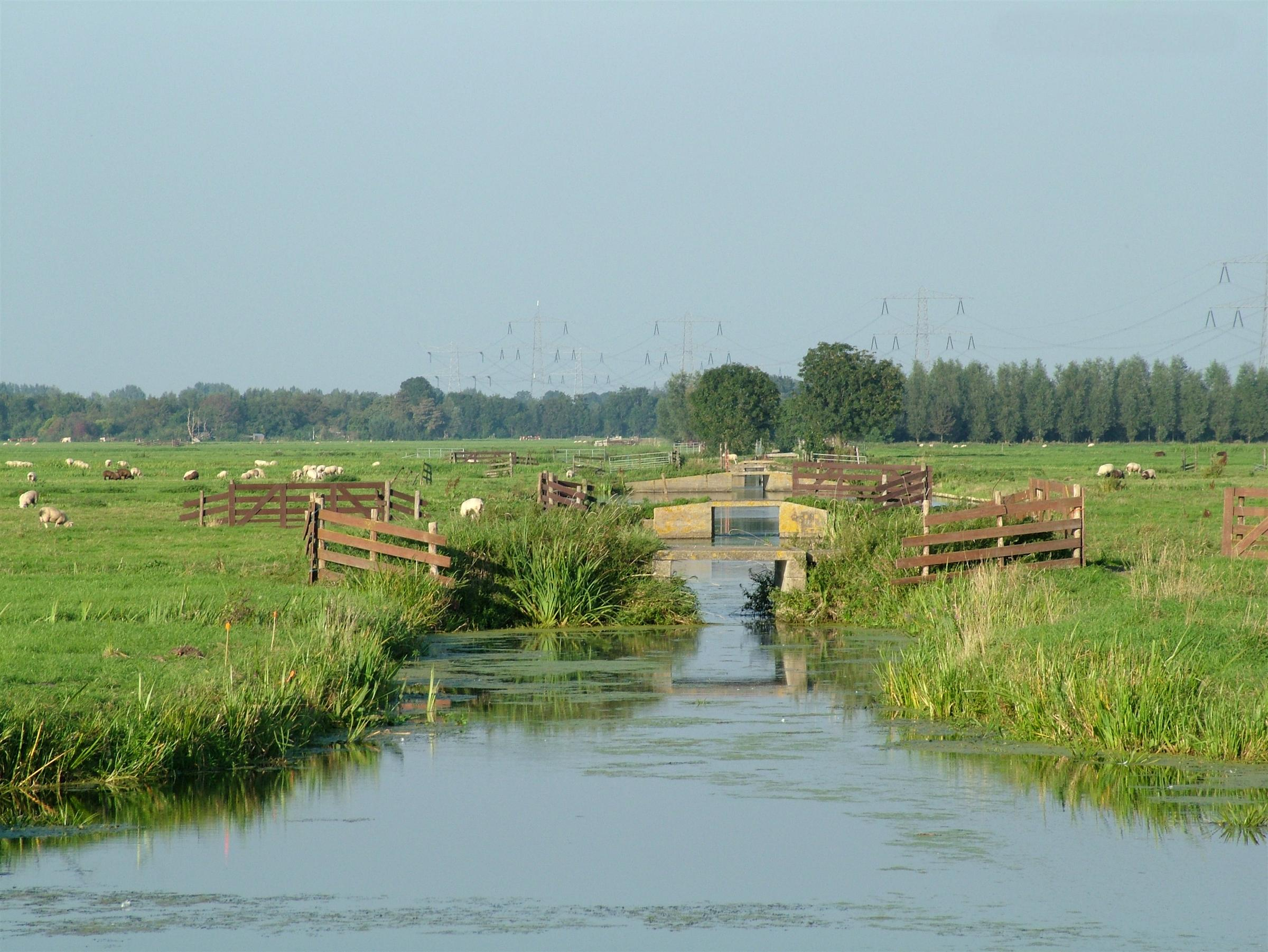
- A typical polder near the town

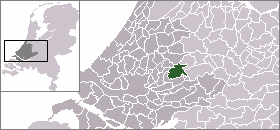

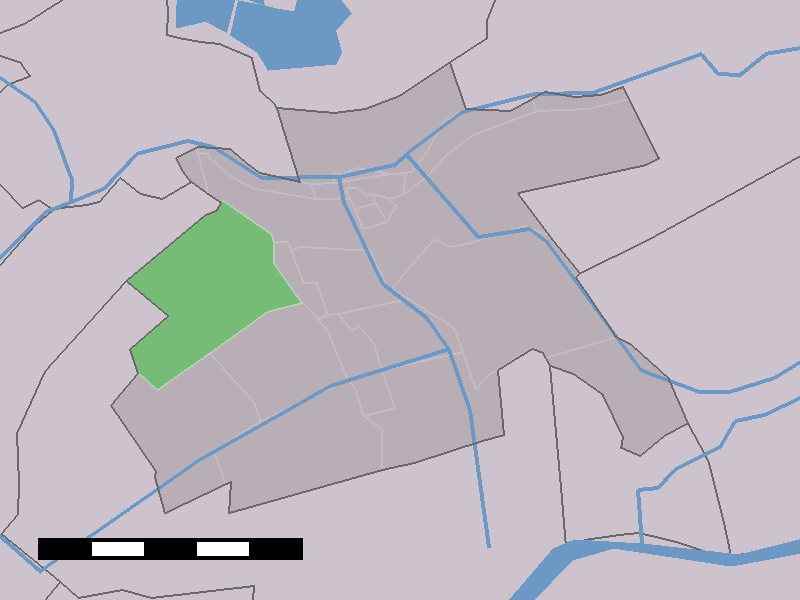
- The village (dark green) and the statistical district (light green) of Het Beijersche in the former municipality of Vlist.
- Coordinates: 51°59′N 4°44′E
- Country: Netherlands
- Province: South Holland
- Municipality: Krimpenerwaard

Population (1 January 2005)
  - Total: 350
- Time zone: UTC+1 (CET)
  - Summer (DST): UTC+2 (CEST)

Het Beijersche is a town in the Dutch province of South Holland. It is a part of the municipality of Krimpenerwaard, and lies about 4 km south of Gouda.

The statistical area "Het Beijersche", which also can include the surrounding countryside, has a population of around 350.

Until 2015, Het Beijersche was part of Vlist.
