= Beneden-Haastrecht =

- Town
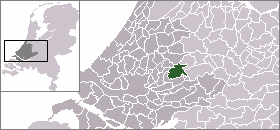

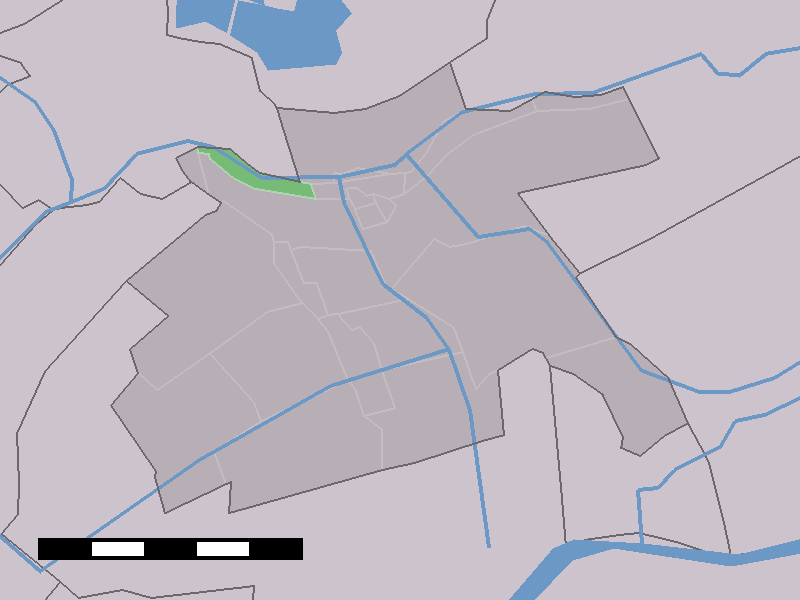
- The village (dark green) and the statistical district (light green) of Beneden-Haastrecht in the former municipality of Vlist.
- Coordinates: 52°0′N 4°45′E
- Country: Netherlands
- Province: South Holland
- Municipality: Krimpenerwaard

Population (1 January 2005)
  - Total: 110
- Time zone: UTC+1 (CET)
  - Summer (DST): UTC+2 (CEST)

Beneden-Haastrecht is a town in the Dutch province of South Holland. It is a part of the municipality of Krimpenerwaard, and lies about 3 km southeast of Gouda.

The statistical area "Beneden-Haastrecht", which also can include the surrounding countryside, has a population of around 110.

Until 2015, Beneden-Haastrecht was part of Vlist.
