= Goudseweg =

- Hamlet
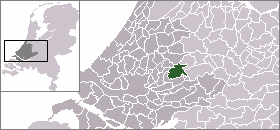

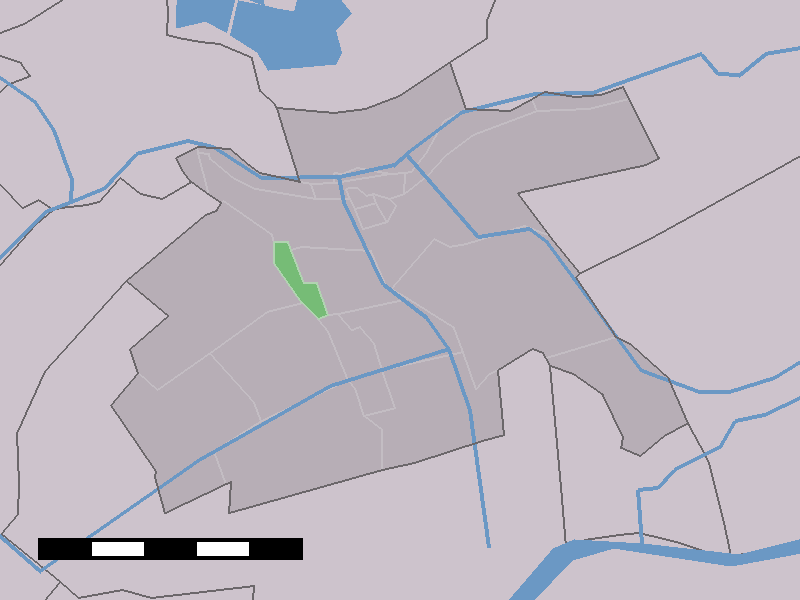
- The village (dark green) and the statistical district (light green) of Goudseweg in the former municipality of Vlist.
- Coordinates: 51°59′04″N 4°45′27″E
- Country: Netherlands
- Province: South Holland
- Municipality: Krimpenerwaard

Population (2007)
  - Total: 50
- Time zone: UTC+1 (CET)
  - Summer (DST): UTC+2 (CEST)

Goudseweg is a town in the Dutch province of South Holland. It is a part of the municipality of Krimpenerwaard, and lies about 5 km southeast of Gouda.

The statistical area "Goudseweg", which also can include the surrounding countryside, has a population of around 50.

Until 2015, Goudseweg was part of Vlist.
