= Schoonouwen =

- Hamlet
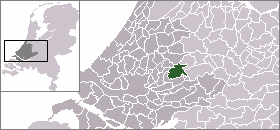

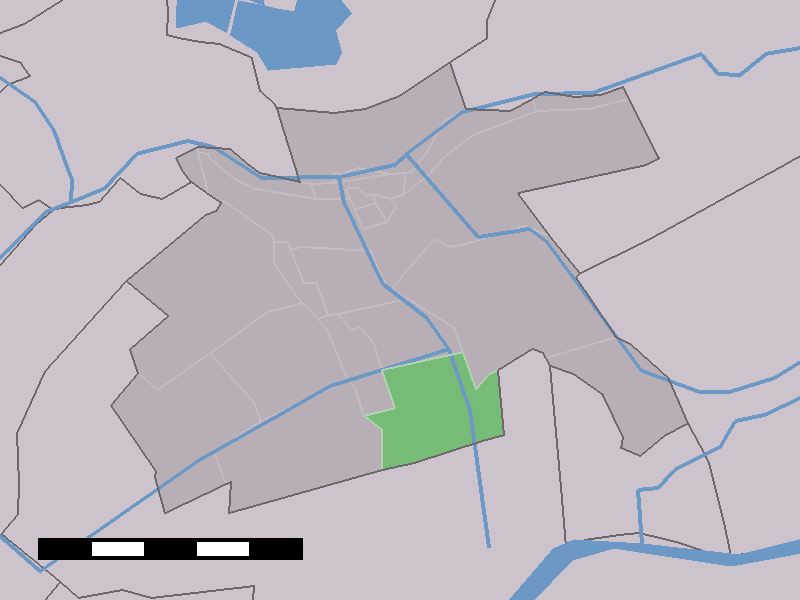
- Schoonouwen in the former municipality of Vlist.
- Coordinates: 51°57′48″N 4°47′37″E
- Country: Netherlands
- Province: South Holland
- Municipality: Krimpenerwaard

Population (2007)
  - Total: 150
- Time zone: UTC+1 (CET)
  - Summer (DST): UTC+2 (CEST)

Schoonouwen is a town in the Dutch province of South Holland. It is a part of the municipality of Krimpenerwaard, and lies about 8 km southeast of Gouda.

The statistical area "Schoonouwen", which also can include the surrounding countryside, has a population of around 160.

Until 2015, Schoonouwen was part of Vlist.
