= Joachim van Plettenberg =

Governor of the Cape of Good Hope

Baron Joachim van Plettenberg
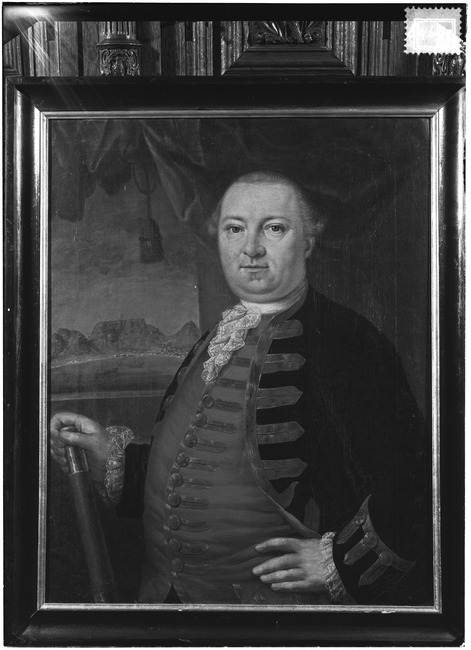
- Joachim van Plettenberg, between 1750 and 1774

Acting Governor of the Dutch Cape Colony
- In office 11 August 1771 – 18 May 1774
- Preceded by: Ryk Tulbagh
- Succeeded by: Pieter van Reede van Oudtshoorn

11th Governor of the Dutch Cape Colony
- In office 18 May 1774 – 14 February 1785
- Preceded by: Pieter van Reede van Oudtshoorn
- Succeeded by: Cornelis Jacob van de Graaff

Personal details
- Born: 8 March 1739 Leeuwarden, Netherlands
- Died: 18 August 1793 (aged 54) Zwolle, Netherlands
- Spouse: Cornelia Charlotte Feith

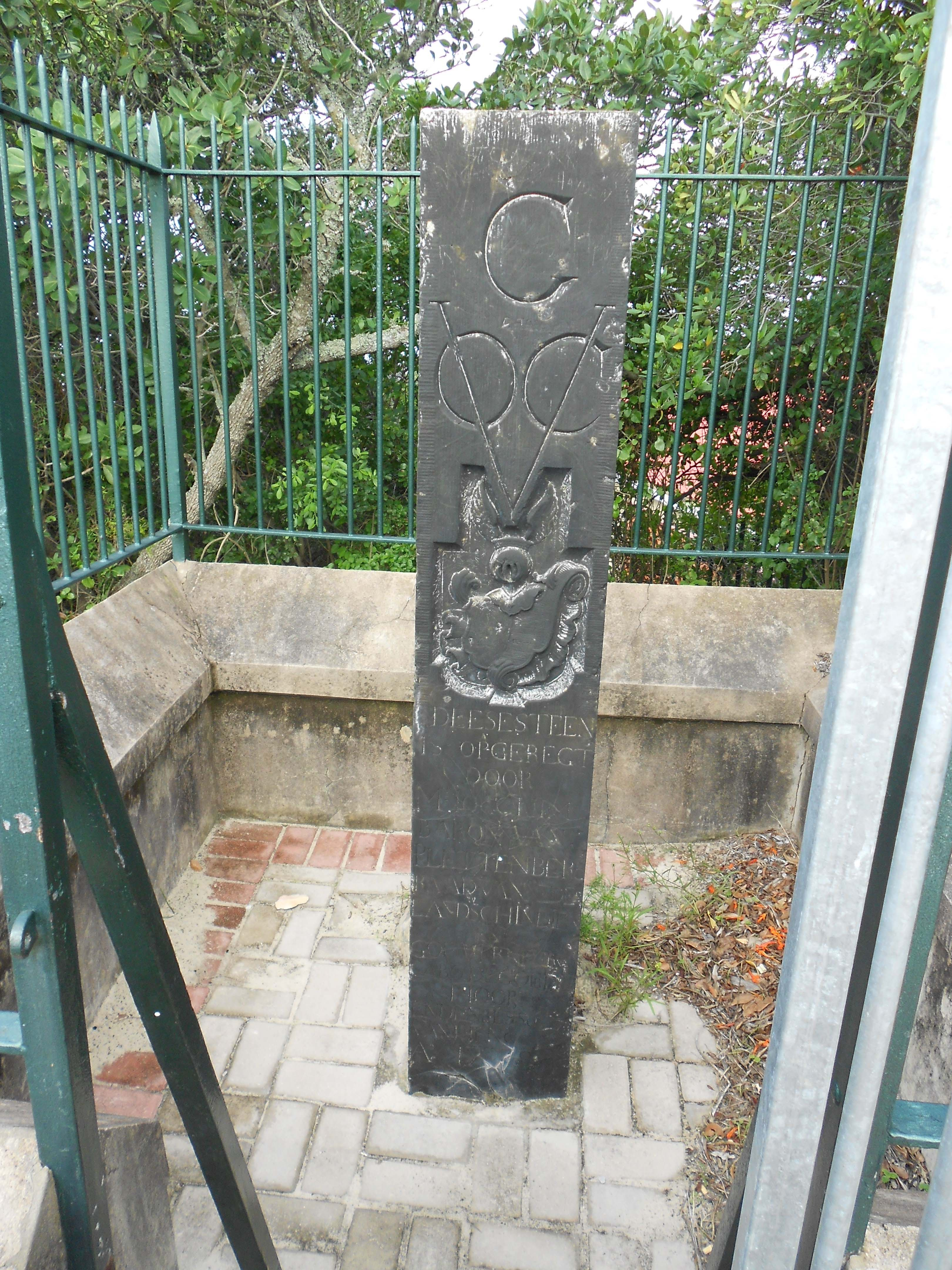
Replica of the van Plettenberg Beacon, Plettenberg Bay, South Africa

Baron Joachim Ammena van Plettenberg (8 March 1739, in Leeuwarden, Netherlands – 18 August 1793, in Zwolle, Netherlands) was the governor of the Cape of Good Hope from 11 August 1771 to 14 February 1785. Plettenberg was presiding governor after Ryk Tulbagh's death. On 18 May 1774 he was permanently appointed as governor.

== Early years ==
Plettenberg descended from the House of Plettenberg, an old aristocratic family from Westphalia in the Holy Roman Empire. His parents were Henrik Casimir van Plettenberg, colonel in the Nassau-Orange garrison in Leeuwarden and his wife, Agatha Petronella van Ammena. After his studies of law at the Utrecht University he left the country in 1764 and became in the service of the Dutch East India Company for 2 years a member of the Council of Law in Batavia. In 1767 he married Cornelia Charlotte Feith, the widow of Louis Taillefer.

== Cape Town ==
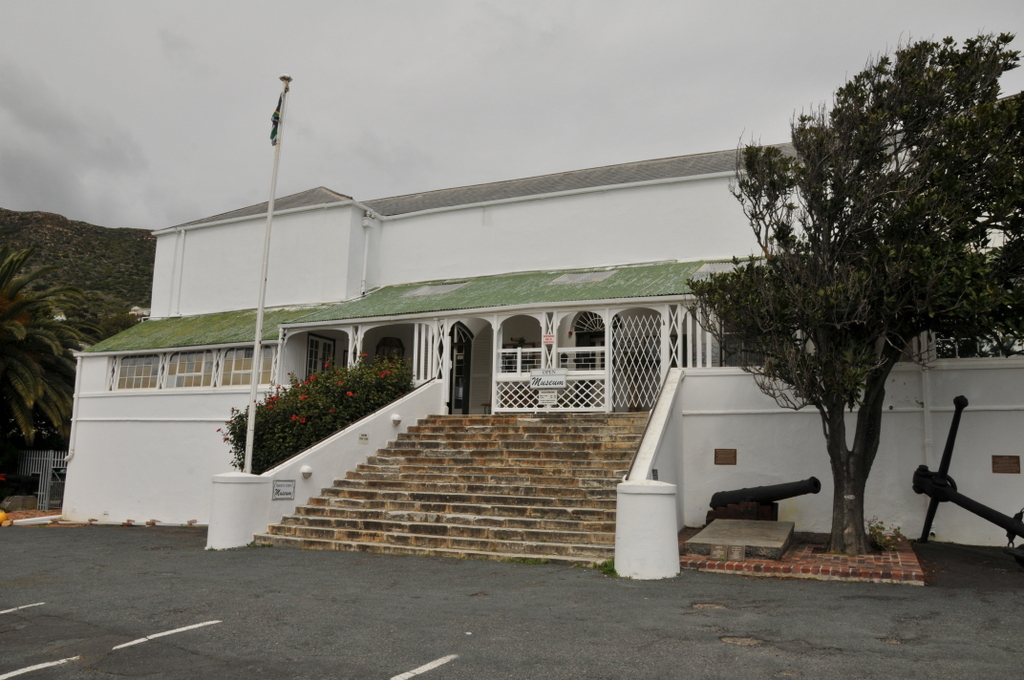
The Residency, erected by Plettenberg in Simon's Town

At this time Cape Town was the property of a commercial company, the Dutch East India Company (VOC) and not a colony of the Netherlands. At 28 years of age, in 1767, Plettenberg became "Independent-Fiscaal", the highest official of justice at Cape Town. After the death of Governor Ryk Tulbagh, Plettenberg took control of the administration; on 11 August 1771, he became governor.

On 1 June 1773, Plettenberg presided over a platoon of 30 soldiers charged with the task of salvaging goods and money from the De Jonge Thomas wrecked in a storm in Table Bay. During the salvage operation, the father of one of the soldiers, Wolraad Woltemade, heroically rescued men from the ship, unaided by the soldiers. In 1781 Van Plettenberg sent five ships to Saldanha Bay to wait for a French escort. In the Battle of Saldanha Bay four ships were taken prize and was destroyed by the captain himself.

The French-influenced Patriotic Movement ("Patriotte beweging") became a strong opposition to him. Petitions of colonists in 1779 and 1782 to the Lords Seventeen of the Dutch East India Company and to the "Staten-Generaal" of the Netherlands in 1784 show the problems between the governor and the colonists. The free burghers wished for greater representation in the courts and policy councils, codification of laws and some economic benefits, such as free trade (which were hindered by the trading activities of Company officials and various restrictions on the farmers).

== Later years ==
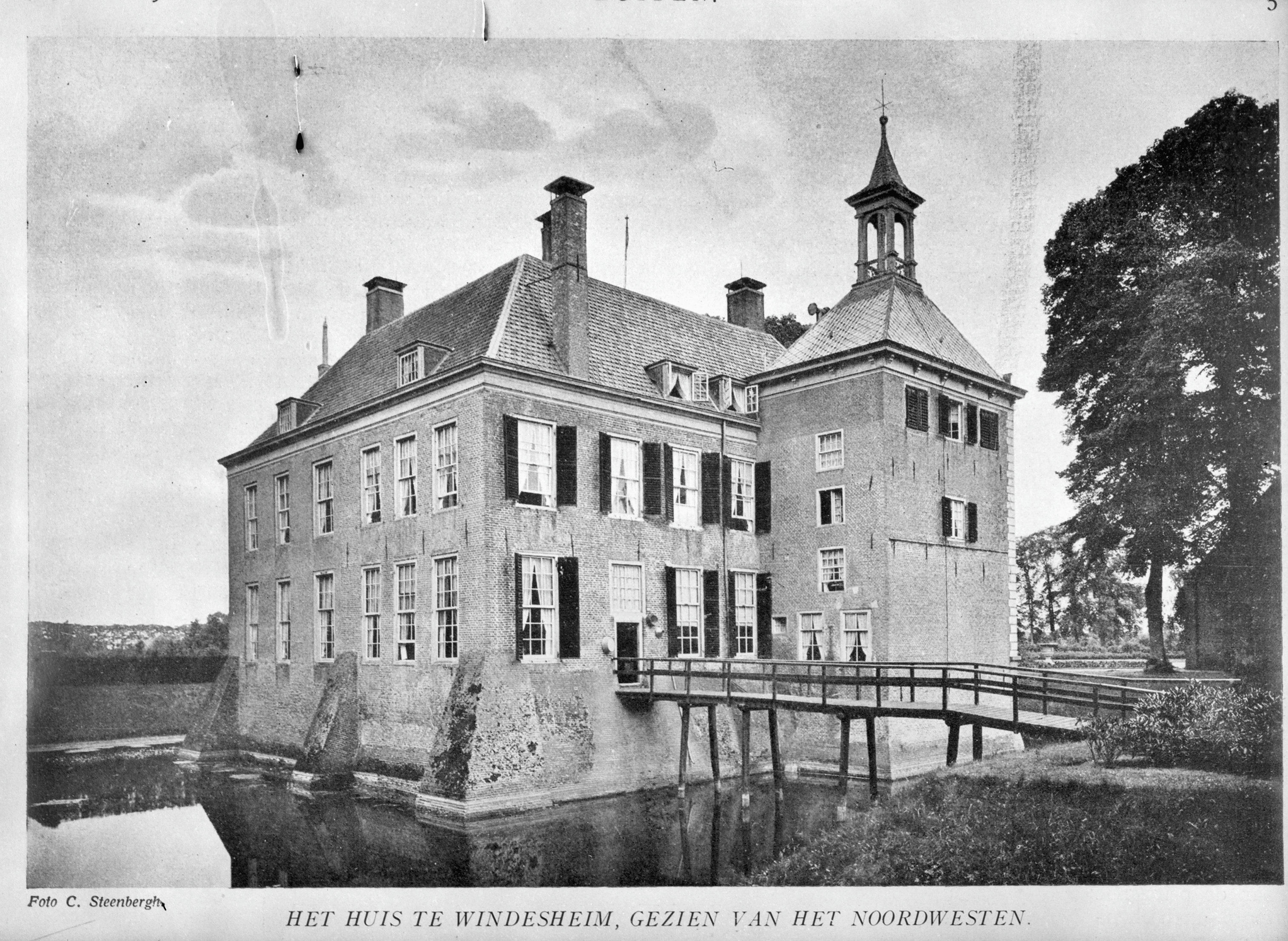
Huis Windesheim

In 1781 Plettenberg defended himself in a record. In 1785 he requested for discharge and was dismissed "with all honors". He resigned on 14 February 1785 and went back to the Netherlands, where he died on 18 August 1793, at his Huis Windesheim, near Zwolle. His successor as Governor of Cape Town was Lieutenant Colonel Cornelis Jacob van de Graaff.

== Exploration ==
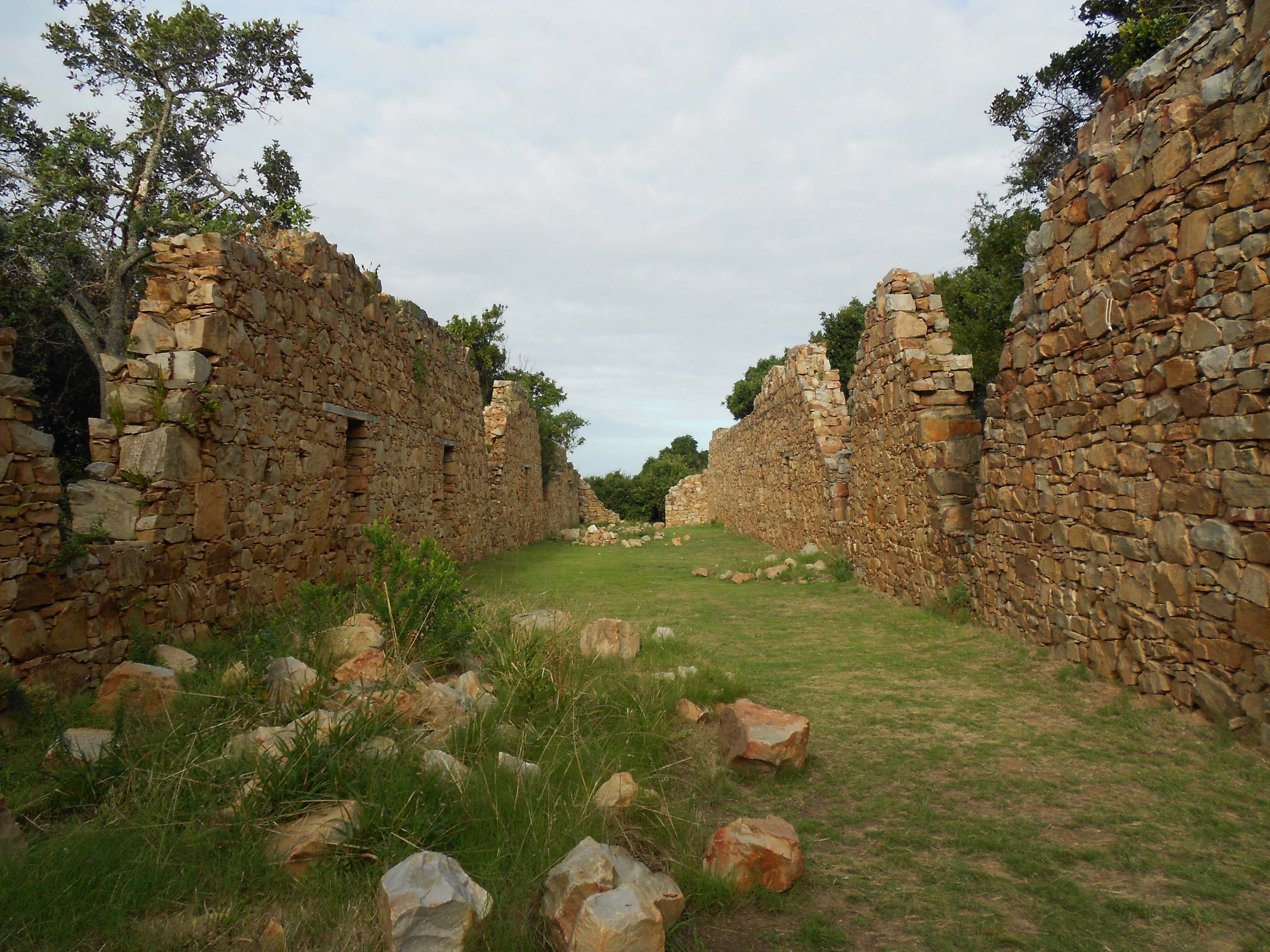
Old Timber Store

Plettenberg had great interest in the discovery of unknown regions and supported the exploration of southern Africa. In his time were the voyages of August Frederik Beutler, Carl Joseph Kindermann, Carl Peter Thunberg, Anders Sparrman, Francis Masson, William Patterson, Jan Splinter Stavornius or Stavorinus, Robert Jacob Gordon and François Le Vaillant (Levaillant).

He made several tours to determine the borders of the Cape-Colony and visited 47 outposts. Among others he erected a column for the Dutch East India Company (VOC) on 6 November 1778, the so-called Van Plettenberg Beacon. Since then, the place where it was erected is called Plettenberg Bay. The Plettenberg Bay area was rich in natural forests. Plettenberg was worried about these forests and suggested that a control post be erected to prevent the over-use of the timber. The Dutch East India Company started a woodcutter’s post in 1778. JF Meeding was appointed the first overseer of this post. In 1786 Johann Jacob Jerling was contracted to build a Timber Store for storage of the timber.

== Legacy ==
- The town of Plettenberg Bay was named after him in 1779.
- His former Residency at Simon's Town dating from 1777 is now the Simon's Town Museum

== Publications ==
- (in German) Weyl, Andreas, Joachim van Plettenberg, Gouverneur der niederländischen Kapkolonie. In: An Bigge, Lenne und Fretter, Part 1: Heft 35, Dezember 2011 p. 25-40; Part 2: Heft 36, Juni 2012 p. 48-61.

== See also ==
- House of Plettenberg
