= Kruiningergors =

- Hamlet
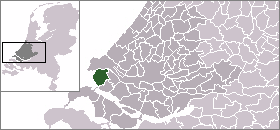

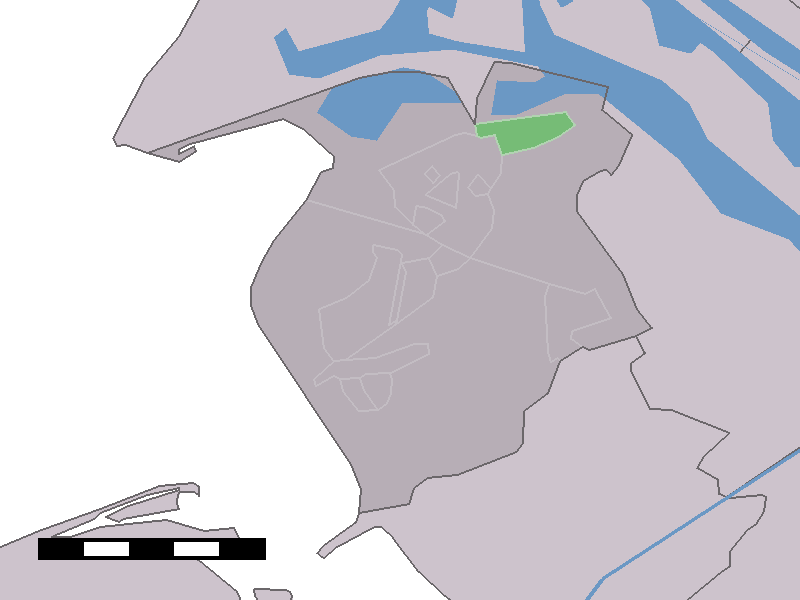
- Kruiningergors in the former municipality of Westvoorne.
- Coordinates: 51°55′14″N 4°07′21″E
- Country: Netherlands
- Province: South Holland
- Municipality: Voorne aan Zee

Population (2007)
  - Total: 170
- Time zone: UTC+1 (CET)
  - Summer (DST): UTC+2 (CEST)

Kruiningergors is a town in the Dutch province of South Holland. It is a part of the municipality of Voorne aan Zee, and lies about 9 km west of Maassluis.

The statistical area "Kruiningergors", which also can include the surrounding countryside, has a population of around 160.
