= Visschershoek =

Visschershoek Vissershoek
- Hamlet
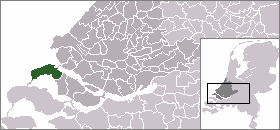

- Visschershoek in the former municipality of Goedereede.
- Coordinates: 51°48′N 3°52′E
- Country: Netherlands
- Province: South Holland
- Municipality: Goeree-Overflakkee
- Time zone: UTC+1 (CET)
  - Summer (DST): UTC+2 (CEST)

Visschershoek is an old farmhouse in the Dutch province of South Holland. The farmhouse is located nearby the lighthouse of Ouddorp, about 7 kilometers from the centre of Ouddorp, next to the dunes on the far western part of the island and municipality of Goeree-Overflakkee.

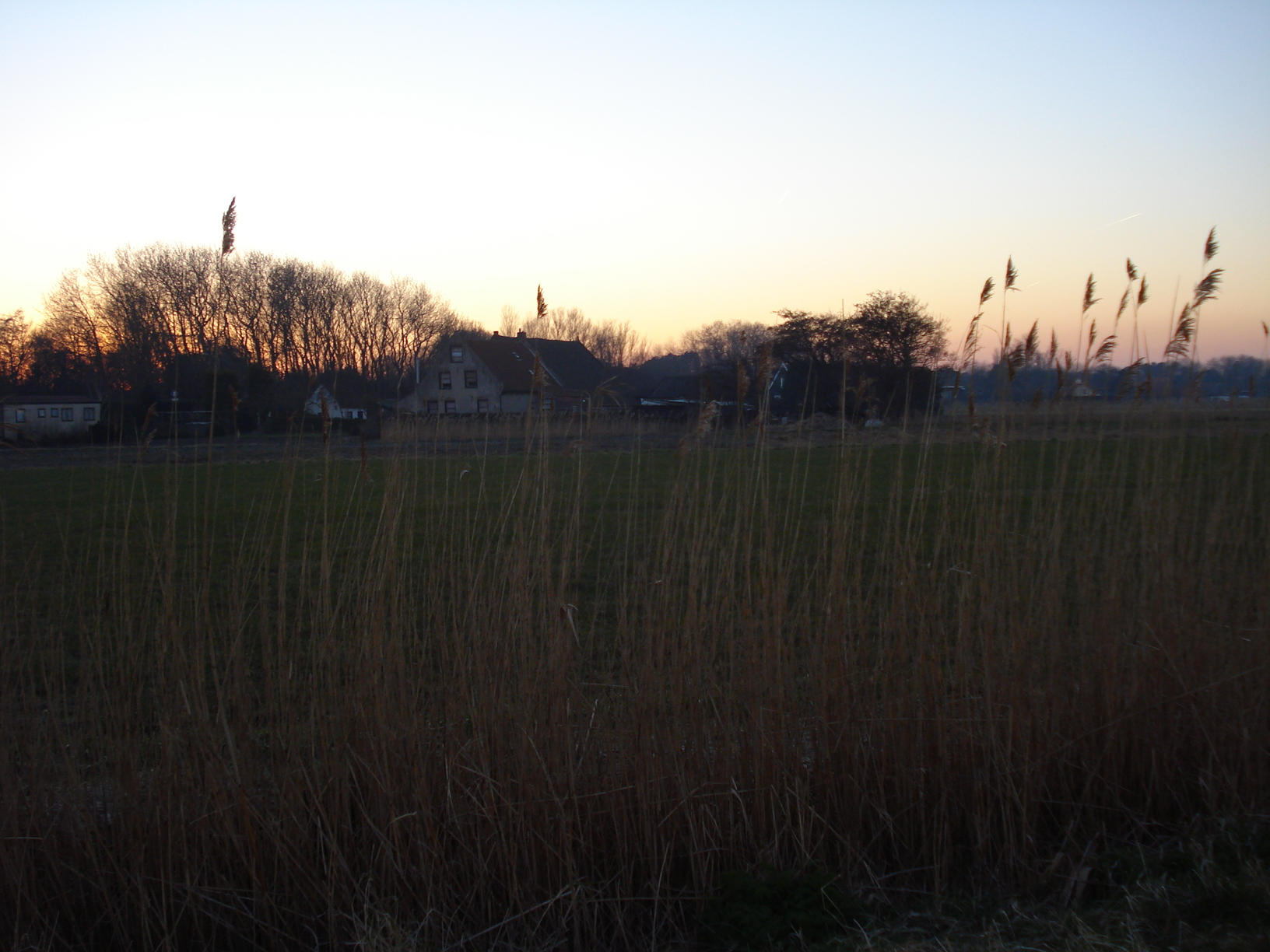
Visschershoek in 2008
