= Koedood =

- Buurtschap
- Interactive map of Koedood
- Location within Netherlands Location within Europe
- Coordinates: 51°50′39″N 4°29′23″E
- Country: Netherlands
- Province: South Holland
- Municipality: Albrandswaard, Barendrecht

Koedood is a hamlet in the Dutch province of South Holland. It is located on the border of the municipalities of Albrandswaard and Barendrecht.

Koedood was the name of a small stream, flowing from the Oude Maas northwest to the Nieuwe Maas, opposite of Schiedam. It separated the island of IJsselmonde from Poortugaal and Rhoon. It was dammed and used for draining the surrounding polders. The hamlet was built near the southern end of the river, and consisted of six houses with 42 inhabitants around the middle of the 19th century.

The hamlet was formerly divided into two parts: "Oude Koedood" in the west and "Nieuwe Koedood" in the east.

The name Koe-dood means Cow death.
