= Zwartsluisje =

- Hamlet
- Location in the province of South Holland in the Netherlands Location in the Netherlands
- Coordinates: 51°46′38″N 4°19′28″E
- Country: Netherlands
- Province: South Holland
- Municipality: Hoeksche Waard
- Time zone: UTC+1 (CET)
  - Summer (DST): UTC+2 (CEST)

Zwartsluisje is a hamlet in the Dutch province of South Holland. It is a part of the municipality of Hoeksche Waard and lies about 7 km (4 mi) south of Spijkenisse.

Zwartsluisje is not a statistical entity, and considered part of Zuid-Beijerland and Piershil. It has place name signs, and consists of about 115 houses.
