= Noordsebuurt =

- Village
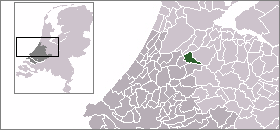

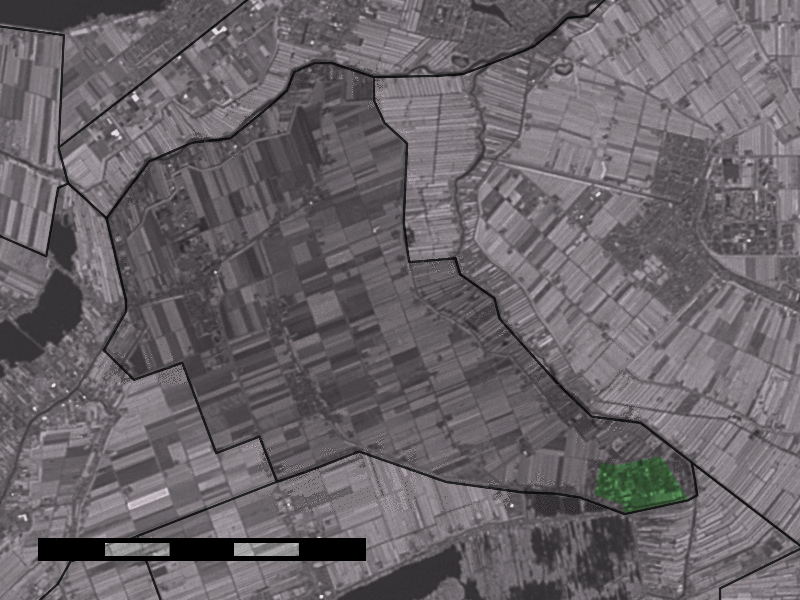
- Noordsebuurt in the municipality of Liemeer.
- Coordinates: 52°10′N 4°51′E
- Country: Netherlands
- Province: South Holland
- Municipality: Nieuwkoop

Population (January 1, 2005)
  - Total: 210
- Time zone: UTC+1 (CET)
  - Summer (DST): UTC+2 (CEST)

Noordsebuurt is a village in the Dutch province of South Holland. It is a part of the municipality of Nieuwkoop, and lies about 10 km north of Woerden.

The statistical area "Noordsebuurt", which also can include the surrounding countryside, has a population of around 210.
