= Weijland =

- Hamlet
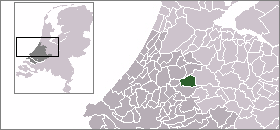

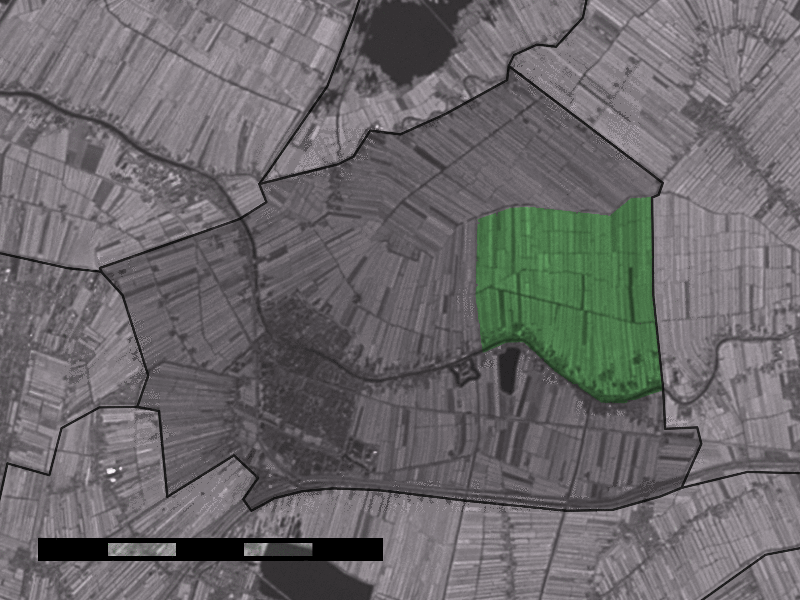
- Weijland in the municipality of Bodegraven.
- Coordinates: 52°05′11″N 4°47′53″E
- Country: Netherlands
- Province: South Holland
- Municipality: Bodegraven

Population (2008)
  - Total: 389
- Time zone: UTC+1 (CET)
  - Summer (DST): UTC+2 (CEST)

Weijland is a village in the Dutch province of South Holland. It is a part of the municipality of Bodegraven, and lies about 5 km west of Woerden.

The statistical area "Weijland", which also can include the surrounding countryside, has a population of around 400.
