= Bommelskous =

Bommelkous
- Hamlet
- Location in the province of South Holland in the Netherlands Location in the Netherlands
- Coordinates: 51°45′44″N 4°25′19″E
- Country: Netherlands
- Province: South Holland
- Municipality: Hoeksche Waard

Bommelkous is a hamlet in the Dutch province of South Holland and is part of the municipality of Hoeksche Waard.

Bommelkous is not a statistical entity, and is considered part of Klaaswaal. It has no place name signs, and consists of about 50 houses.
