= Stuifakker =

- Hamlet
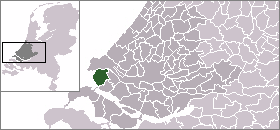

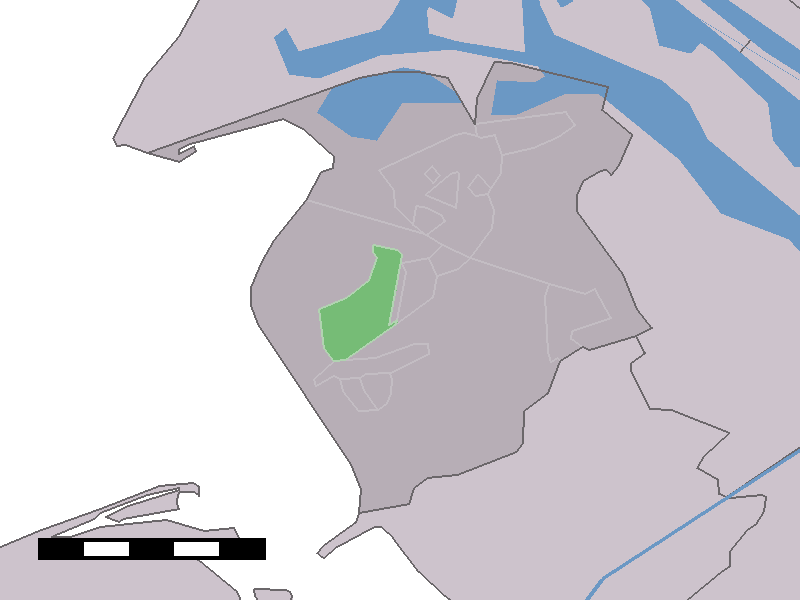
- Stuifakker in the former municipality of Westvoorne.
- Coordinates: 51°53′15″N 4°04′01″E
- Country: Netherlands
- Province: South Holland
- Municipality: Voorne aan Zee

Population (2007)
  - Total: 600
- Time zone: UTC+1 (CET)
  - Summer (DST): UTC+2 (CEST)

Stuifakker is a town in the Dutch province of South Holland. It is a part of the municipality of Voorne aan Zee, and lies about 8 km northwest of Hellevoetsluis.

The statistical area "Stuifakker", which also can include the surrounding countryside, has a population of around 600.
