= Oud-Bodegraven =

- Hamlet
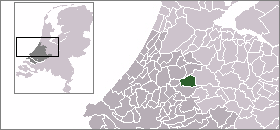

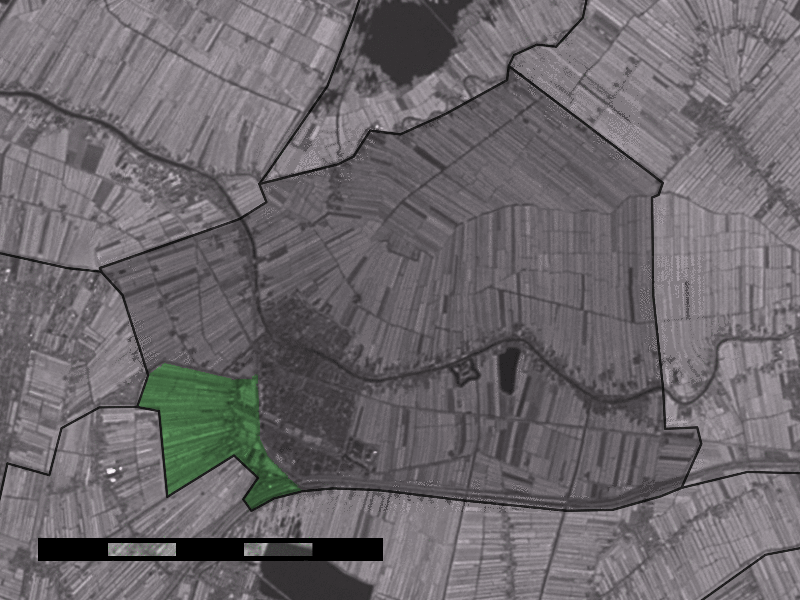
- Oud-Bodegraven in the municipality of Bodegraven.
- Coordinates: 52°04′24″N 4°44′00″E
- Country: Netherlands
- Province: South Holland
- Municipality: Bodegraven

Population (2008)
  - Total: 133
- Time zone: UTC+1 (CET)
  - Summer (DST): UTC+2 (CEST)

Oud-Bodegraven is a village in the Dutch province of South Holland. It is a part of the municipality of Bodegraven, and lies about 7 km north of Gouda.

The statistical area "Oud-Bodegraven", which also can include the surrounding countryside, has a population of around 110.
