= Rolpaal =

- Hamlet
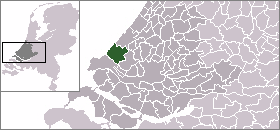

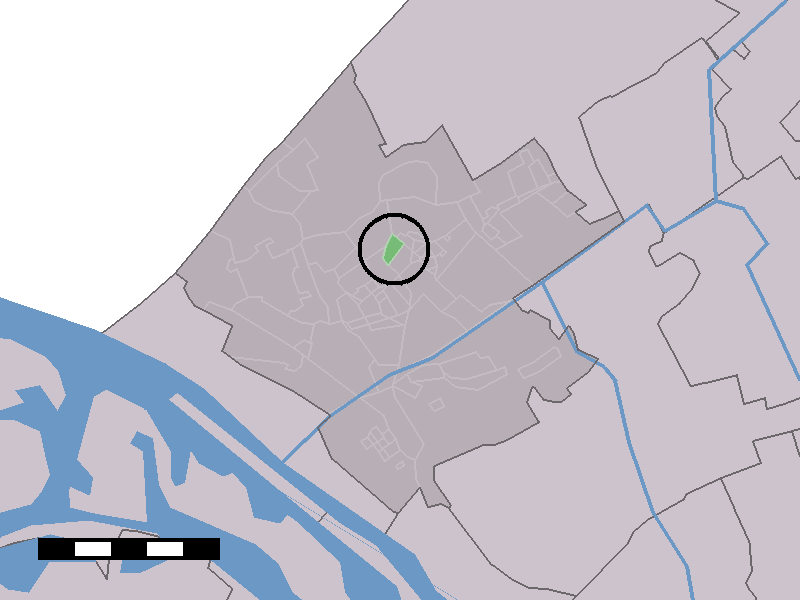
- Rolpaal in the municipality of Westland.
- Coordinates: 52°1′N 4°13′E
- Country: Netherlands
- Province: South Holland
- Municipality: Westland

Population (January 1, 2005)
  - Total: 40
- Time zone: UTC+1 (CET)
  - Summer (DST): UTC+2 (CEST)

Rolpaal is a hamlet in the Dutch province of South Holland. It is a part of the municipality of Westland, and lies about 9 km southwest of The Hague.

The statistical area "Rolpaal", which also can include the surrounding countryside, has a population of around 40.
