= Steenplaats =

- Hamlet
- Location in the province of South Holland in the Netherlands Location in the Netherlands
- Coordinates: 51°43′57″N 4°34′16″E
- Country: Netherlands
- Province: South Holland
- Municipality: Hoeksche Waard

Steenplaats is a hamlet in the Dutch province of South Holland and is part of the municipality of Hoeksche Waard. Steenplaats lies a few hundred metres southeast of Strijen.

Steenplaats is not a statistical entity, and considered part of Strijen. It has no place name signs, and consists of about 70 houses.
