= Arnoud, Hillegom =

Arnoud
- Township
- Interactive map of Arnoud
- Coordinates: 52°16′47″N 4°34′23″E
- Country: Netherlands
- Province: South Holland
- Municipality: Hillegom

Population
  - Total: 0

Arnoud was a small township in the Dutch province of South Holland. The township was located between Hillegom and Lisse. It consisted of a single street (Arnoudstraat) and was developed as part of the creation of De Arnoud factory in 1904. Over time the factory expanded and the houses on Arnoudstraat had to be torn down. The area of Arnoud is now called Hillegom-Zuid and is an industrial area with no inhabitants.
