= Overslingeland =

- Hamlet
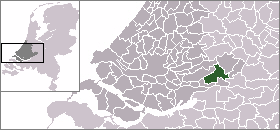

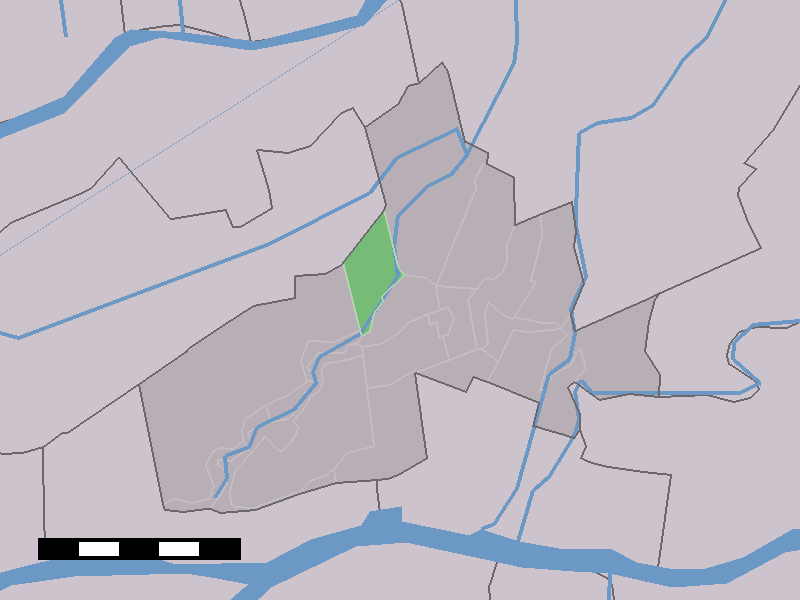
- Overslingeland in the municipality of Giessenlanden.
- Coordinates: 51°52′55″N 4°55′33″E
- Country: Netherlands
- Province: South Holland
- Municipality: Molenlanden

Population (2007)
  - Total: 140
- Time zone: UTC+1 (CET)
  - Summer (DST): UTC+2 (CEST)

Overslingeland is a hamlet in the Dutch province of South Holland. It is a part of the town of Noordeloos inside the municipality Molenlanden, and lies about 6 km northwest of Gorinchem.

The statistical area "Overslingeland", which also can include the surrounding countryside, has a population of around 140.
