= Middelsluis =

- Hamlet
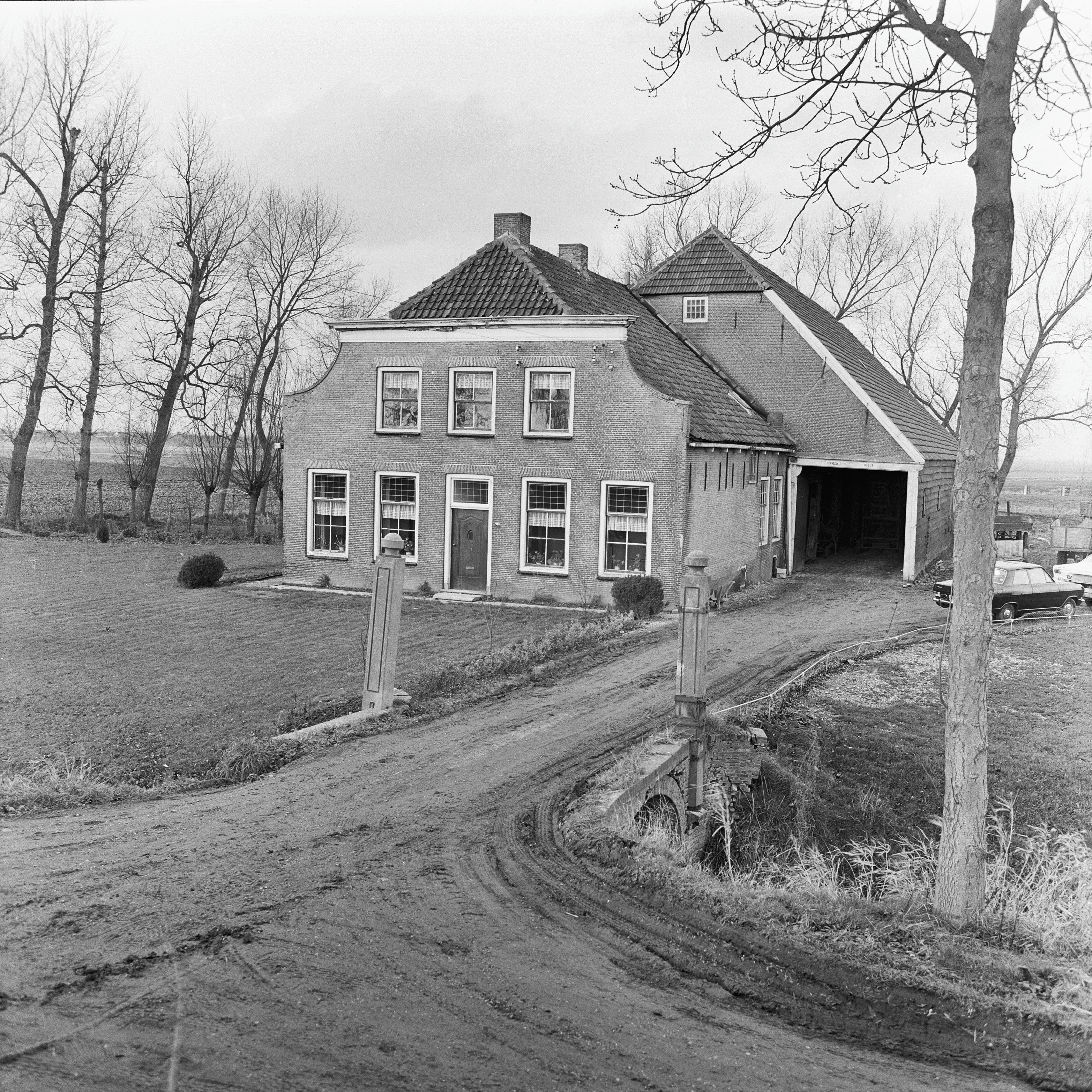
- Farm Cornelia's Hoeve

- Location in the province of South Holland in the Netherlands Location in the Netherlands
- Coordinates: 51°44′31″N 4°26′29″E
- Country: Netherlands
- Province: South Holland
- Municipality: Hoeksche Waard

Middelsluis is a hamlet in the Dutch province of South Holland and is part of the municipality of Hoeksche Waard. Middelsluis lies south of Numansdorp in the southern part of the municipality.

Middelsluis is not a statistical entity, and considered part of Numansdorp. It has no place name signs, and consists of about 350 houses.
