= Oudendijk, Korendijk =

Oudendijk
- Hamlet
- Location in the province of South Holland in the Netherlands Location in the Netherlands
- Coordinates: 51°46′12″N 4°16′43″E
- Country: Netherlands
- Province: South Holland
- Municipality: Hoeksche Waard
- Time zone: UTC+1 (CET)
  - Summer (DST): UTC+2 (CEST)

Oudendijk is a hamlet in the Dutch province of South Holland. It is a part of the municipality of Hoeksche Waard, and lies about 9 km southwest of Spijkenisse.

Oudendijk is not a statistical entity, and considered part of Klaaswaal. It has no place name signs, and consists of about 60 houses.
