= Hitsertse Kade =

- Hamlet
- Location in the province of South Holland in the Netherlands Location in the Netherlands
- Coordinates: 51°44′20″N 4°21′55″E
- Country: Netherlands
- Province: South Holland
- Municipality: Hoeksche Waard

Hitsertse Kade is a hamlet in the Dutch province of South Holland and is part of the municipality of Hoeksche Waard.

Hitsertse Kade is not a statistical entity, and is considered part of Klaaswaal. It has a little marina and some holiday homes.
