= Noordse Dorp =

- Hamlet
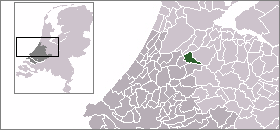

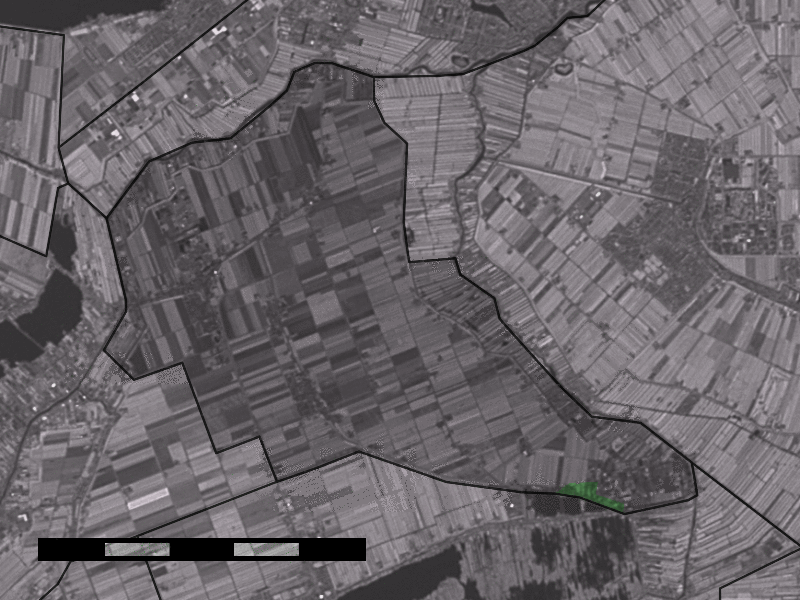
- Noordse Village in the municipality of Liemeer.
- Coordinates: 52°10′09″N 4°50′20″E
- Country: Netherlands
- Province: South Holland
- Municipality: Nieuwkoop

Population (2007)
  - Total: 60
- Time zone: UTC+1 (CET)
  - Summer (DST): UTC+2 (CEST)

Noordse Dorp is a village in the Dutch province of South Holland. It is a part of the municipality of Nieuwkoop, and lies about 10 km north of Woerden.

The statistical area "Noordse Dorp", which also can include the surrounding countryside, has a population of around 60.
