= Matena, Netherlands =

Matena
- Village
- Interactive map of Matena
- Coordinates: 51°49′41″N 4°43′54″E
- Country: Netherlands
- Province: South Holland
- Municipality: Papendrecht

Matena is a small village in the west of the Netherlands. It is located in the municipality of Papendrecht, South Holland, east of the town Papendrecht.
