= Koolwijk, South Holland =

Koolwijk
- Hamlet
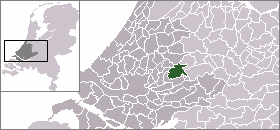

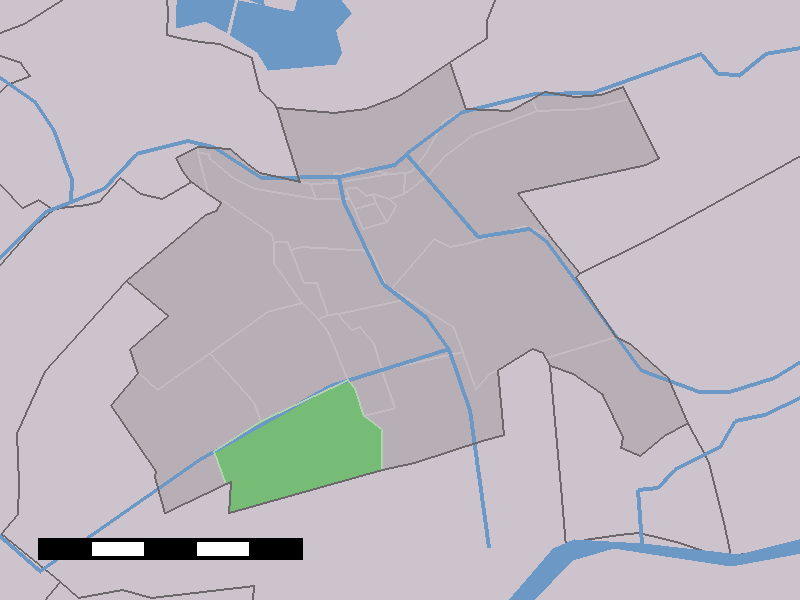
- Koolwijk in the former municipality of Vlist.
- Coordinates: 51°57′19″N 4°45′30″E
- Country: Netherlands
- Province: South Holland
- Municipality: Krimpenerwaard

Population (2007)
  - Total: 100
- Time zone: UTC+1 (CET)
  - Summer (DST): UTC+2 (CEST)

Koolwijk (South Holland) is a hamlet in the Dutch province of South Holland. It is a part of the municipality of Krimpenerwaard, and lies about 7 km south of Gouda.

The statistical area "Koolwijk", which also can include the surrounding countryside, has a population of around 100.

Until 2015, Koolwijk was part of Vlist.
