= Hogeveen =

Settlement in the Netherlands

Coordinates: 52°05′N 4°35′E

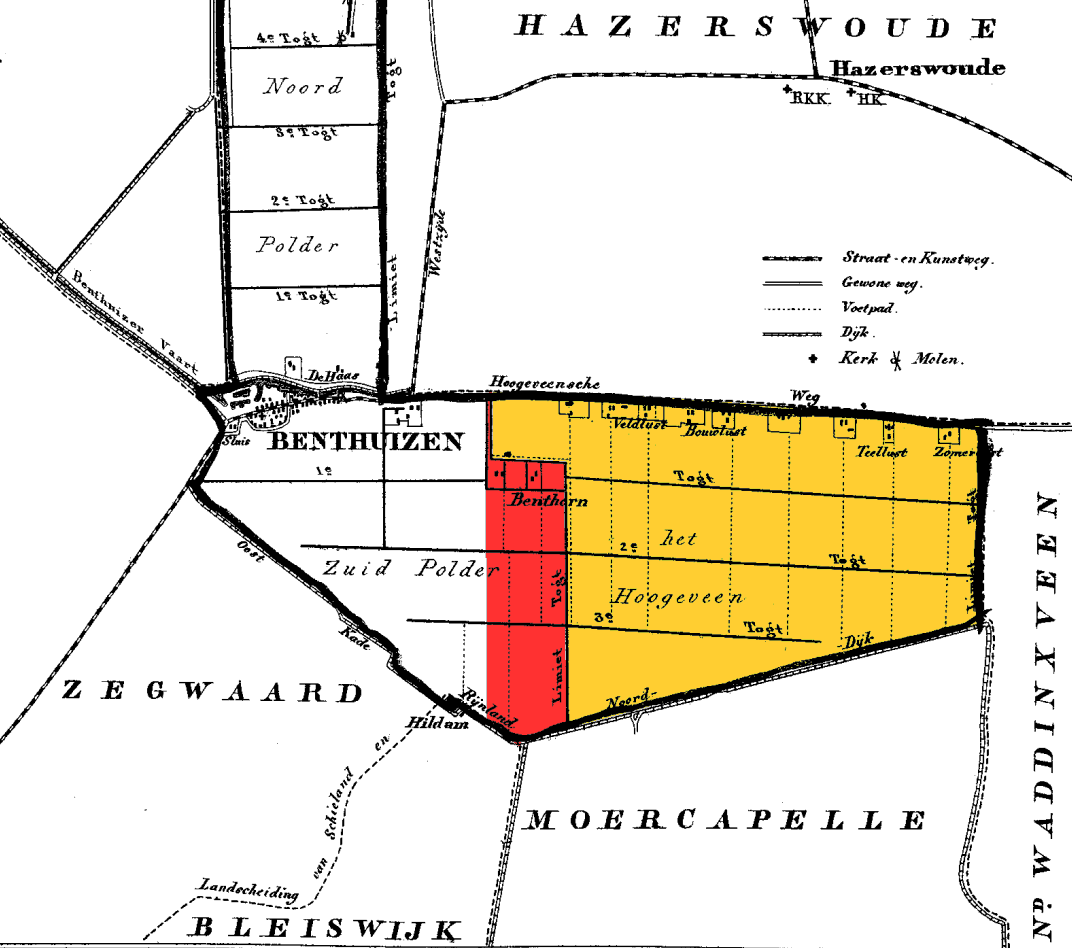
The municipality of Hogeveen (1817-1855), in yellow, on an 1868 map of the municipality of Benthuizen.

Hogeveen is a hamlet in the Dutch province of South Holland. It is located in the municipality of Alphen aan den Rijn, about 2 km south of Hazerswoude-Dorp.

Hogeveen (then also spelled Hoogeveen) was a separate municipality between 1817 and 1855, when it merged with Benthuizen. The municipality was often called "Hoogeveen in Rijnland" to distinguish it from the municipality Hoogeveen in Delfland, also in South Holland.

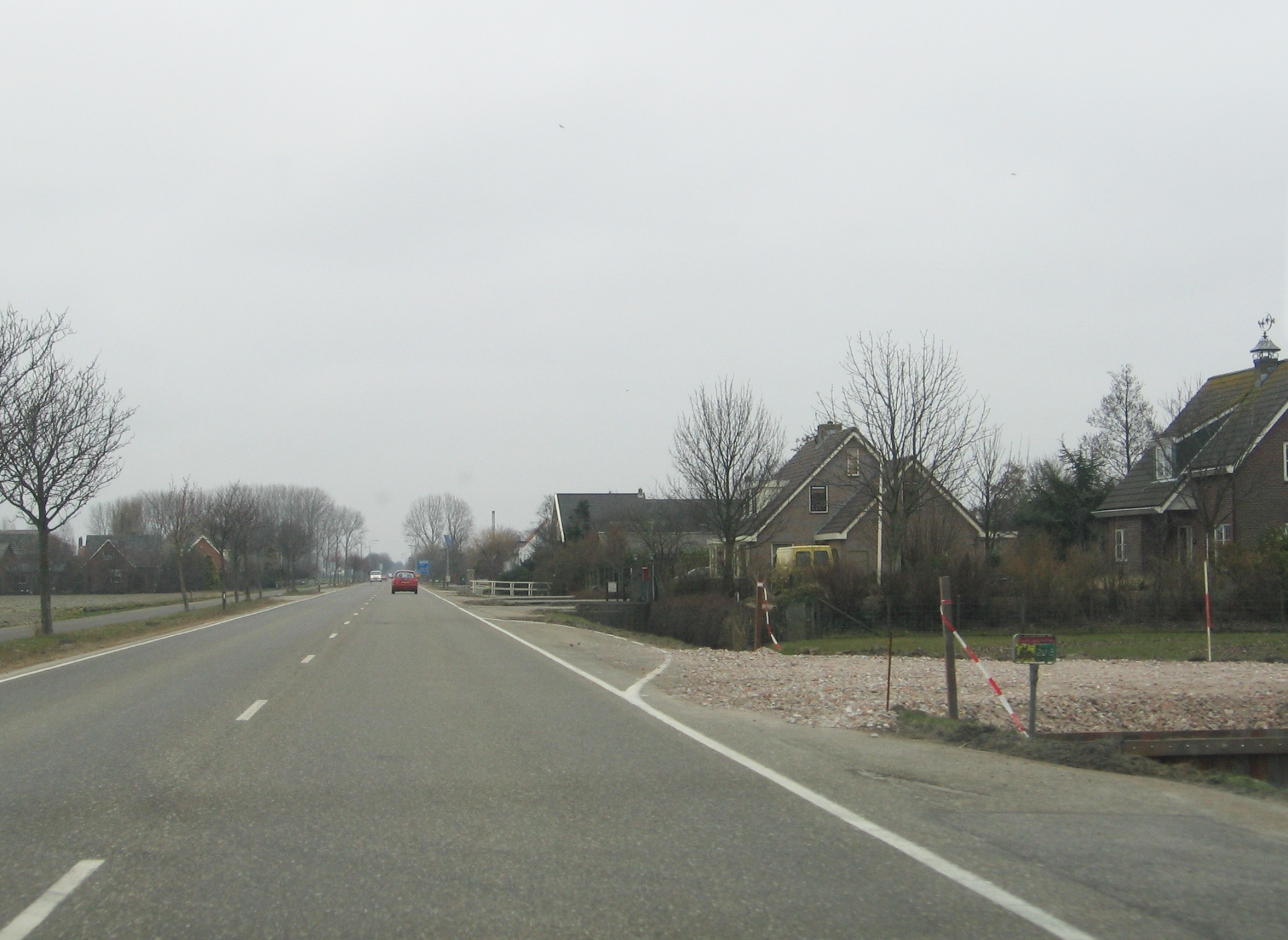
Hogeveen
