= Zuideinde, South Holland =

Zuideinde
- Hamlet
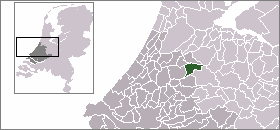

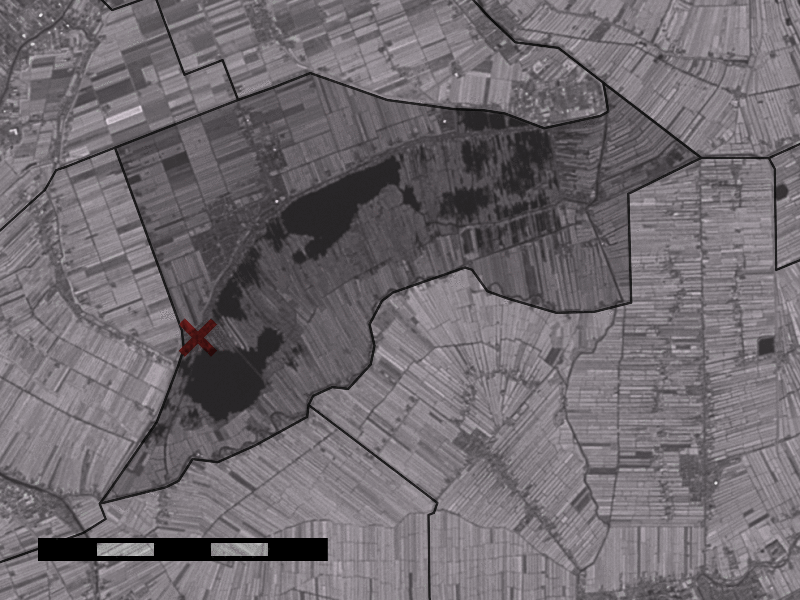
- Zuideinde in the municipality of Nieuwkoop.
- Coordinates: 52°8′N 4°46′E
- Country: Netherlands
- Province: South Holland
- Municipality: Nieuwkoop
- Time zone: UTC+1 (CET)
  - Summer (DST): UTC+2 (CEST)

Zuideinde is a hamlet in the Dutch province of South Holland. It is a part of the municipality of Nieuwkoop, and lies about 7 km east of Alphen aan den Rijn.
