= Slikkendam =

- Hamlet
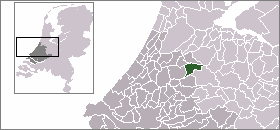

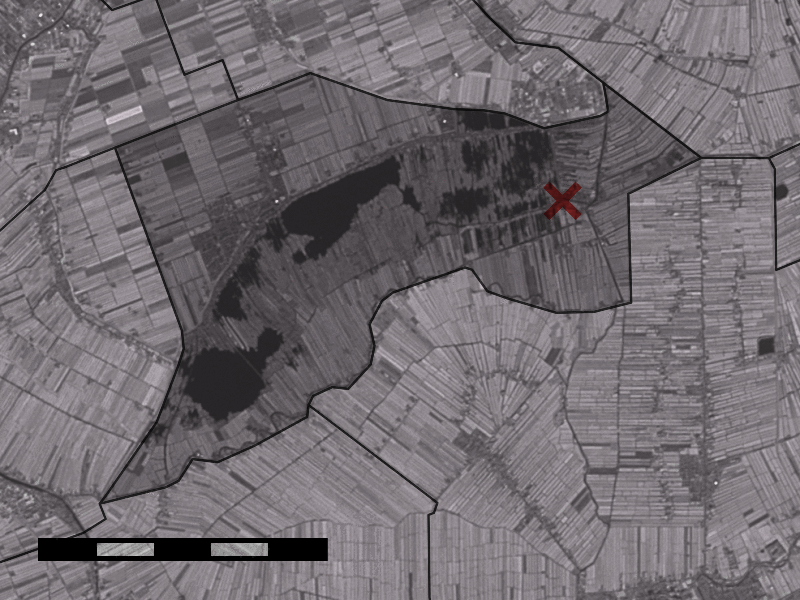
- Slikkendam in the municipality of Nieuwkoop.
- Coordinates: 52°09′16″N 4°52′24″E
- Country: Netherlands
- Province: South Holland
- Municipality: Nieuwkoop
- Time zone: UTC+1 (CET)
  - Summer (DST): UTC+2 (CEST)

Slikkendam is a hamlet in the Dutch province of South Holland. It is a part of the municipality of Nieuwkoop, and lies about 8 km north of Woerden.
