= Gnephoek =

- Hamlet
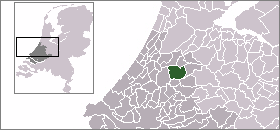
- Gnephoek in the municipality of Alphen aan den Rijn.

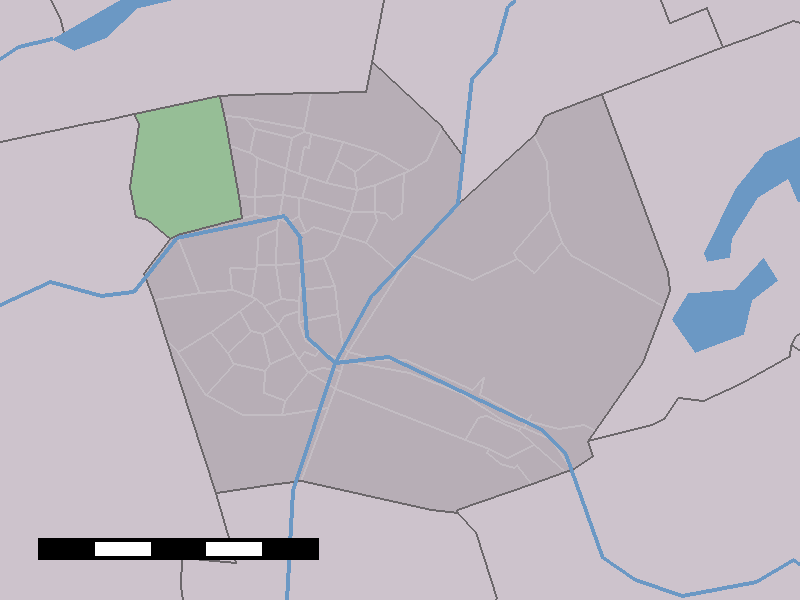
- Coordinates: 52°8′N 4°38′E
- Country: Netherlands
- Province: South Holland
- Municipality: Alphen aan den Rijn

Population (2007)
  - Total: 240

Gnephoek is a polder and a hamlet in the Dutch province of South Holland. It is a part of the municipality of Alphen aan den Rijn, and lies about 2 km west of Alphen aan den Rijn.

The statistical area "Gnephoek", which also can include the surrounding countryside, has a population of around 250.
