= Ridderbuurt =

- Hamlet
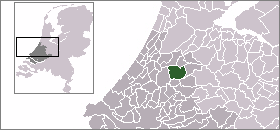

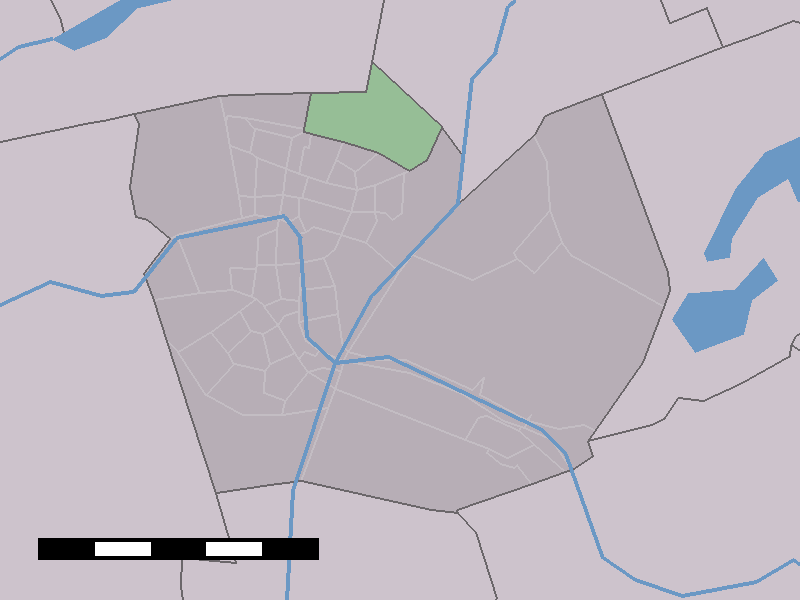
- Ridderbuurt in the municipality of Alphen aan den Rijn.
- Coordinates: 52°09′18″N 4°40′29″E
- Country: Netherlands
- Province: South Holland
- Municipality: Alphen aan den Rijn

Population (2007)
  - Total: 120
- Time zone: UTC+1 (CET)
  - Summer (DST): UTC+2 (CEST)

Ridderbuurt is a hamlet in the Dutch province of South Holland. It is a part of the municipality of Alphen aan den Rijn, and lies about 2 km north of Alphen aan den Rijn. The statistical area "Ridderbuurt", which also can include the surrounding countryside, has a population of around 120.
