= Hoogeveen, Nootdorp =

Former municipality in South Holland, The Netherlands

Coordinates: 52°3′6″N 4°25′25″E

Hoogeveen is a former municipality in the Dutch province of South Holland. It was located about 2 km east of the town of Nootdorp.

Hoogeveen was a separate municipality between 1817 and 1833, when it merged with Nootdorp.
