= Rietveld, Giessenlanden =

Rietveld
- Hamlet
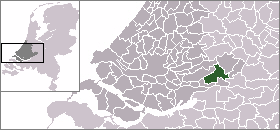

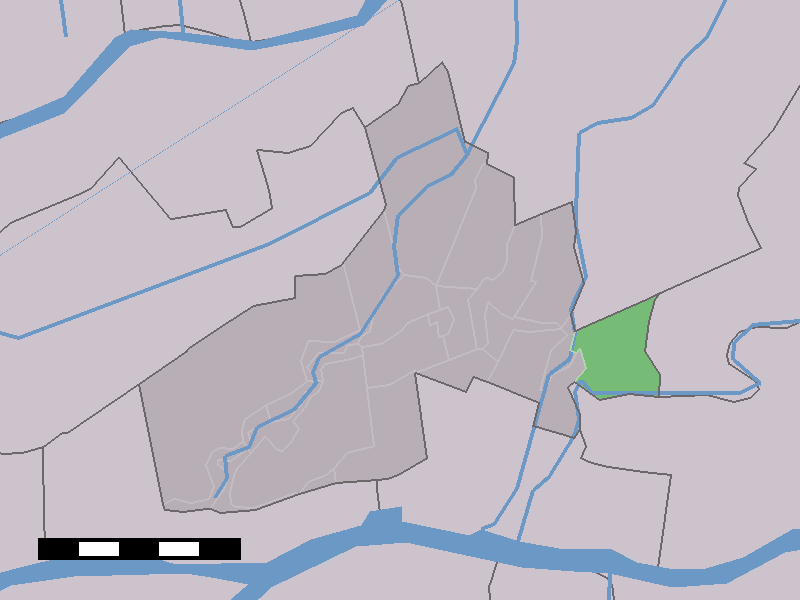
- Rietveld in the municipality of Giessenlanden.
- Coordinates: 51°51′38″N 5°0′43″E
- Country: Netherlands
- Province: South Holland
- Municipality: Molenlanden

Population (1 January 2005)
  - Total: 180
- Time zone: UTC+1 (CET)
  - Summer (DST): UTC+2 (CEST)

Rietveld is a town in the Dutch province of South Holland. It is a part of the municipality of Molenlanden, and lies about 4 km northeast of Gorinchem.

The statistical area "Rietveld", which also can include the surrounding countryside, has a population of around 180.
