= Strype, Netherlands =

Strype
- Town
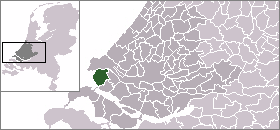

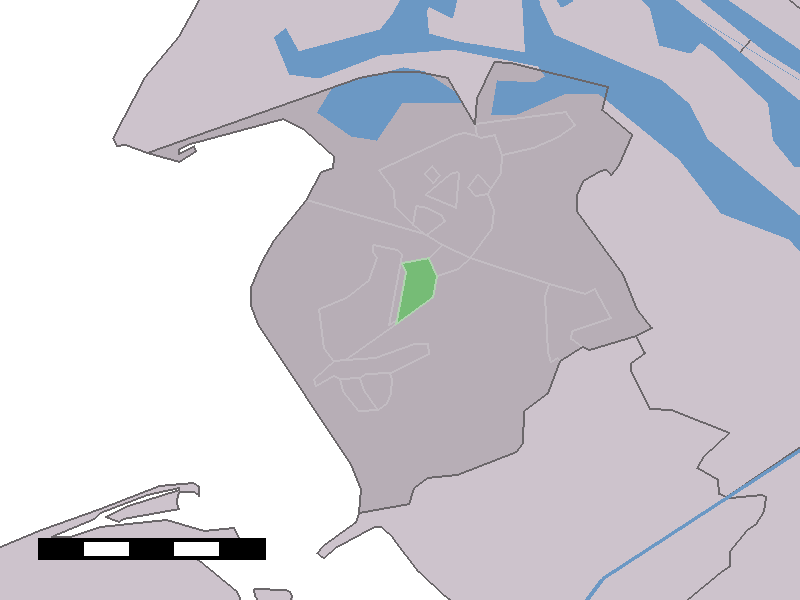
- Strype in the former municipality of Westvoorne.
- Coordinates: 51°53′N 4°5′E
- Country: Netherlands
- Province: South Holland
- Municipality: Voorne aan Zee
- Time zone: UTC+1 (CET)
  - Summer (DST): UTC+2 (CEST)

Strype is a town in the Dutch province of South Holland. It is a part of the municipality of Voorne aan Zee, and lies approximately 8 km northwest of Hellevoetsluis.

The statistical area "Strype", which also can include the surrounding countryside, has a population of approximately 200.
