= Oudesluis, Hoeksche Waard =

Oudesluis
- Hamlet
- Location in the province of South Holland in the Netherlands Location in the Netherlands
- Coordinates: 51°45′35″N 4°26′40″E
- Country: Netherlands
- Province: South Holland
- Municipality: Hoeksche Waard

Oudesluis is a hamlet in the Dutch province of South Holland and is part of the municipality of Hoeksche Waard.

Oudesluis is not a statistical entity, and considered part of Klaaswaal and Numansdorp. It has no place name signs, and consists of about 40 houses.
