= Zuidzijde, Bodegraven-Reeuwijk =

Zuidzijde
- Hamlet
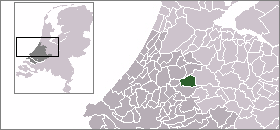

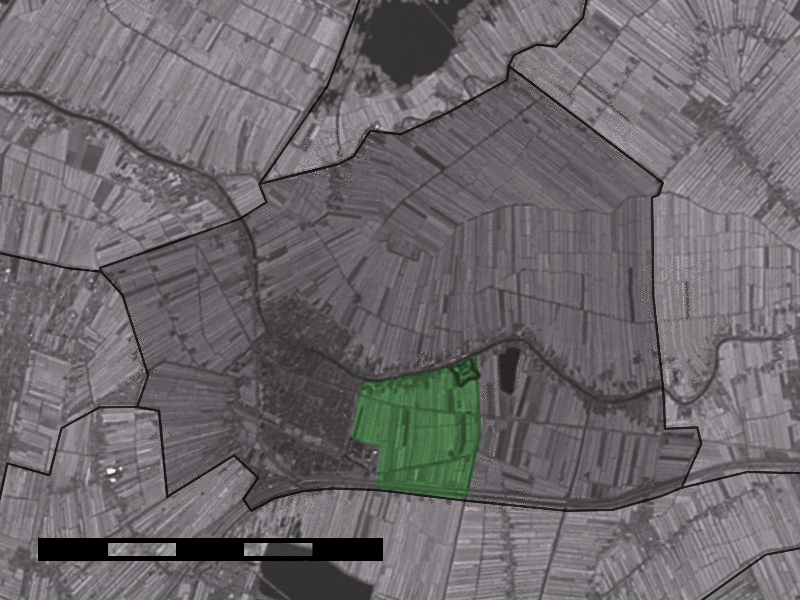
- Zuidzijde in the municipality of Bodegraven.
- Coordinates: 52°04′48″N 4°46′31″E
- Country: Netherlands
- Province: South Holland
- Municipality: Bodegraven-Reeuwijk

Population (2008)
  - Total: 236
- Time zone: UTC+1 (CET)
  - Summer (DST): UTC+2 (CEST)

Zuidzijde is a village in the Dutch province of South Holland. It is a part of the municipality of Bodegraven-Reeuwijk, and lies about 7 km west of Woerden.

The statistical area "Zuidzijde", which also can include the surrounding countryside, has a population of around 240.
