= Vlist =

- Village and former municipality
- Flag

- Location of the former municipality in South Holland
- Coordinates: 51°58′N 4°46′E
- Country: Netherlands
- Province: South Holland
- Municipality: Krimpenerwaard
- Established: 1 January 1985

Area
  - Total: 56.51 km^{2} (21.82 sq mi)
  - Land: 53.71 km^{2} (20.74 sq mi)
  - Water: 2.80 km^{2} (1.08 sq mi)
- Elevation: 0 m (0 ft)

Population (January 2021)
  - Total: data missing
- Time zone: UTC+1 (CET)
  - Summer (DST): UTC+2 (CEST)
- Postcode: 2850–2855
- Area code: 0182
- Website: www.gemeentevlist.nl

Vlist (Dutch pronunciation: [vlɪst]) is a village and former municipality in the western Netherlands, in the province of South Holland. As of 2015, it is a part of the municipality of Krimpenerwaard.

== Description ==
Vlist is named after the river with the same name, along which the population is concentrated. The river forms a connection between the Lek river and the city of Schoonhoven to Haastrecht, where it empties into the Hollandsche IJssel. It has a length of approximately 9 kilometres (5.6 miles). The Vlist was formerly used as a drainage basin for polders around the river; there were many windmills on the banks of the river, to pump water out of the adjacent polders and into the river. It was also used for the transport of goods, particularly from Schoonhoven to Utrecht. Today the river has a larger function in tourism, and is particularly popular among cyclists and pedestrians, who enjoy walking or riding along the river. The river itself is often navigated with canoes which can be rented in Haastrecht. If the river is sufficiently frozen in winter, the Two Provinces skating tour is organized for the ice-skate enthusiasts.

== Arrest at Goejanverwellesluis ==
Famously, along the river Vlist, Wilhelmina of Prussia, was halted by patriots from Gouda while on her way to The Hague. She was planning to attempt to convince the States General to let her husband William V return to the city. The patriots tried to prevent this and she was then brought to a farm near the Goejanverwellesluis (in present Hekendorp). Afterwards, she was not allowed further passage into Holland and returned to Nijmegen without result. This event, that directly led to the invasion of the Dutch Republic by Frederick William II of Prussia and the fall of the patriots, occurred on June 28, 1787, and is (incorrectly, because it happened at Bonrepas) known as the Arrest at Goejanverwellesluis.

== International relations ==
=== Twin towns - Sister cities ===
Vlist is twinned with:

- Bač, Serbia
