= Binnenmaas =

- Former municipality
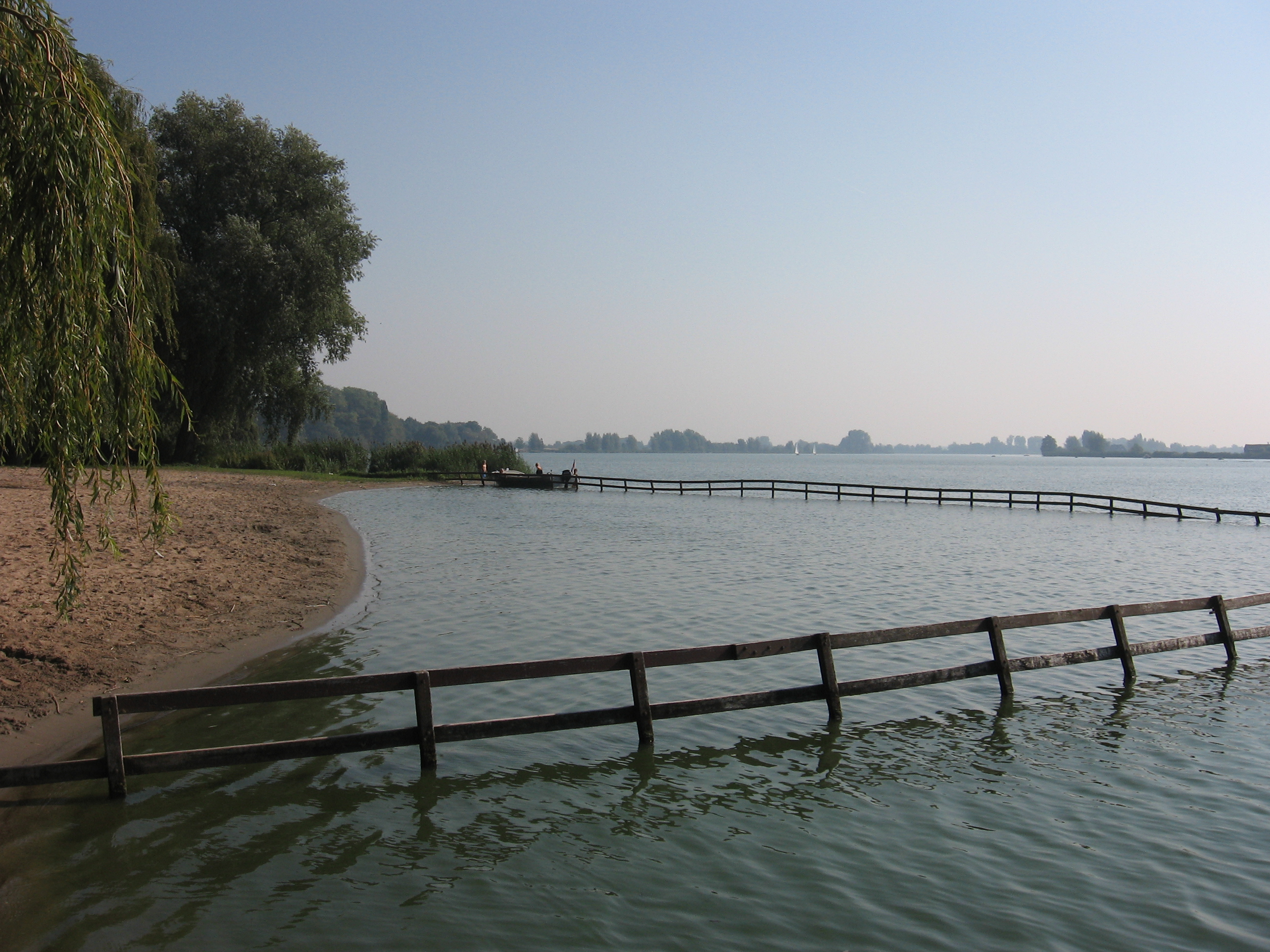
- Lake Binnenmaas

- Flag Coat of arms

- Location in South Holland
- Coordinates: 51°48′N 4°33′E
- Country: Netherlands
- Province: South Holland
- Municipality: Hoeksche Waard
- Merged: 2019

Area
  - Total: 75.57 km^{2} (29.18 sq mi)
  - Land: 69.26 km^{2} (26.74 sq mi)
  - Water: 6.31 km^{2} (2.44 sq mi)
- Elevation: −1 m (−3.3 ft)

Population (January 2021)
  - Total: data missing
- Time zone: UTC+1 (CET)
  - Summer (DST): UTC+2 (CEST)
- Postcode: 3270–3274, 3295–3299
- Area code: 0186, 078
- Website: www.binnenmaas.nl

Binnenmaas (Dutch pronunciation: [ˈbɪnəmaːs]) was a municipality in the western Netherlands, in the province of South Holland. The municipality had a population of data missing in 2021, and covers an area of 75.57 km^{2} (29.18 sq mi) of which 6.31 km^{2} (2.44 sq mi) is water. It is named after the lake of the same name.

The municipality was formed on 1 January 1984 by the merger of the municipalities Puttershoek, Maasdam, Mijnsheerenland, Westmaas, and Heinenoord. On 1 January 2007 the municipality 's-Gravendeel was added to Binnenmaas. On 1 January 2019 it was merged with Cromstrijen, Korendijk, Oud-Beijerland, and Strijen to form the municipality of Hoeksche Waard.

The municipality of Binnenmaas consists of the following communities: Blaaksedijk, De Wacht, Goidschalxoord, 's-Gravendeel, Greup, Heinenoord, Kuipersveer, Maasdam, Maasdijk, Mijnsheerenland, Puttershoek, Reedijk, Schenkeldijk, Sint Anthoniepolder, Westdijk, Westmaas and Zwanegat.

== Topography ==
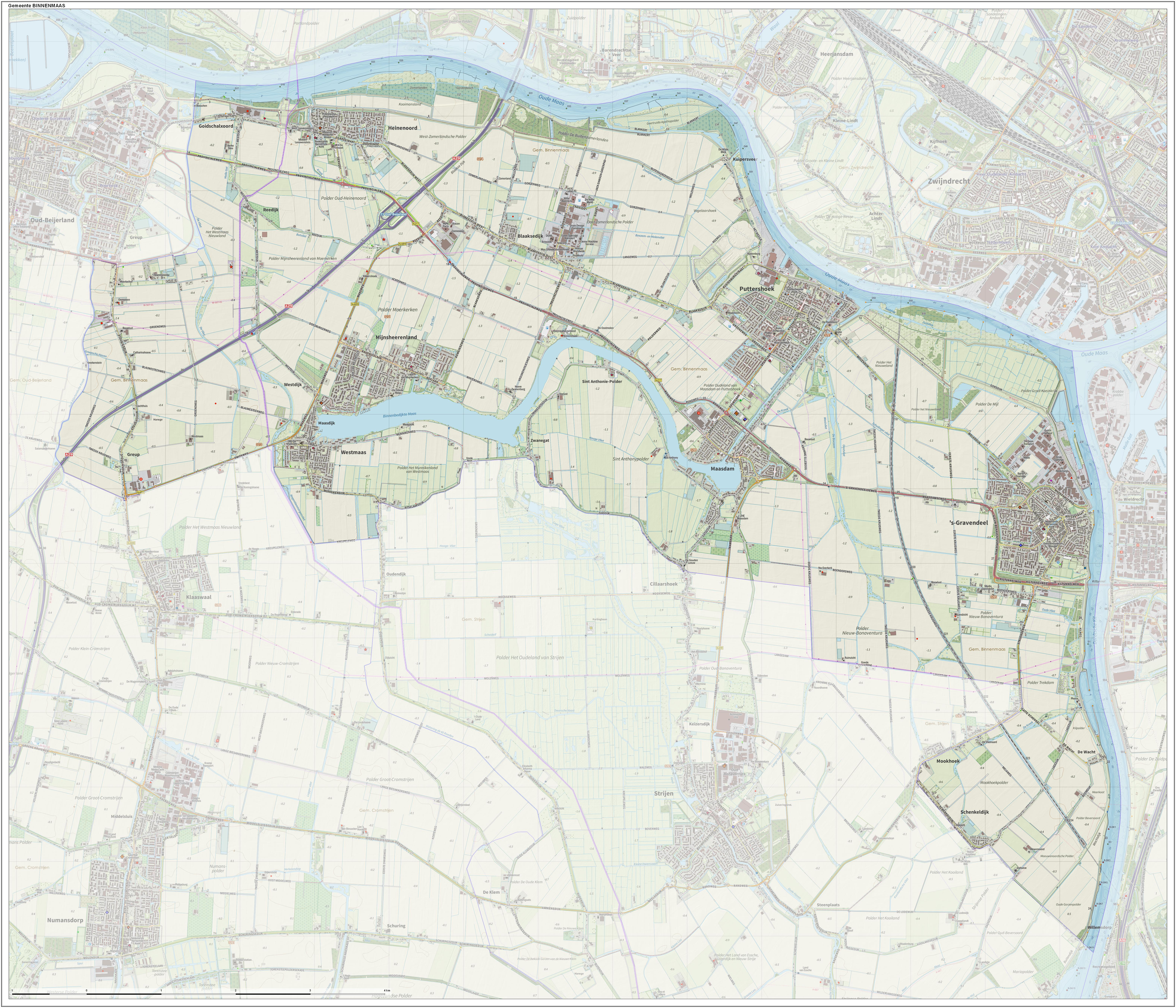

Dutch Topographic map of the municipality of Binnenmaas, June 2015.
