= Maasdijk, Hoeksche Waard =

Maasdijk
- Hamlet
- Location in the province of South Holland in the Netherlands Location in the Netherlands
- Coordinates: 51°47′42″N 4°28′22″E
- Country: Netherlands
- Province: South Holland
- Municipality: Hoeksche Waard

Maasdijk is a hamlet in the Dutch province of South Holland and is part of the municipality Hoeksche Waard. Maasdijk lies north west of Westmaas on the road to Reedijk.

Maasdijk is not a statistical entity, and considered part of Mijnsheerenland. It has place name signs, and consists of about 30 or 50 houses depending on the definition.
