= Blaaksedijk =

- Hamlet
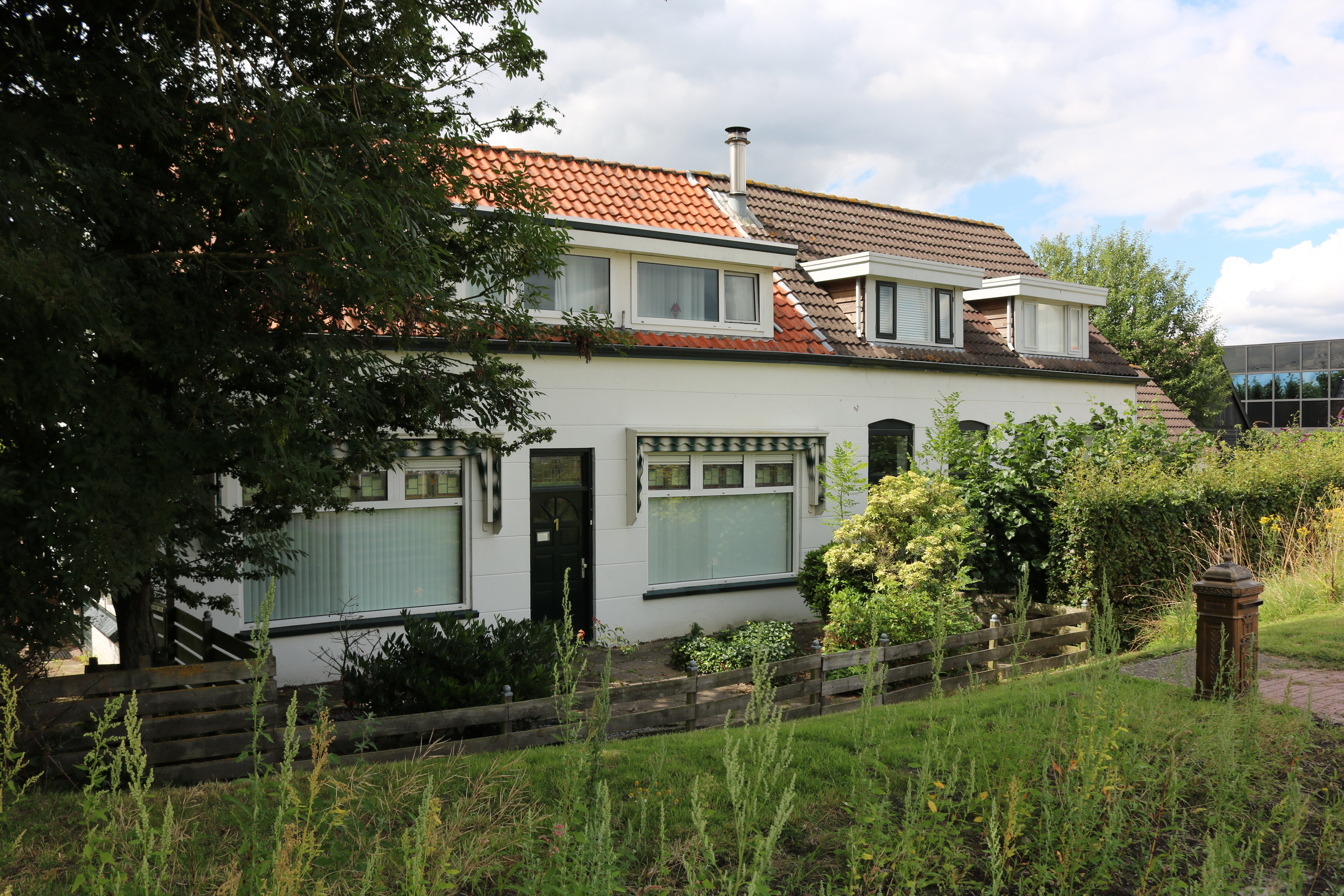
- Houses in Blaaksedijk

- Location in the province of South Holland in the Netherlands Location in the Netherlands
- Coordinates: 51°48′49″N 4°30′40″E
- Country: Netherlands
- Province: South Holland
- Municipality: Hoeksche Waard

Blaaksedijk is a hamlet on a dike in the Dutch province of South Holland. The village lies in the municipality of Hoeksche Waard (formerly Binnenmaas). Blaaksedijk lies between Puttershoek, Mijnsheerenland and Heinenoord.

Blaaksedijk is considered part of Mijnsheerenland. It has place name signs, and consists of about 350 houses.

At the nearby industrial area Boonsweg the "Nettorama" is located, one of the largest supermarkets of the Hoekse Waard, formerly known as the "Witte Boerderij" (White Farm). The "Witte Markt" (White Market) is also located there, a flea market which continues to attract a large number of visitors every Saturday.
