= Schenkeldijk =

Schenkeldijk may refer to the following places in the Netherlands:

- Schenkeldijk, Binnenmaas
- Schenkeldijk, Korendijk
