= Zwanegat =

- Hamlet
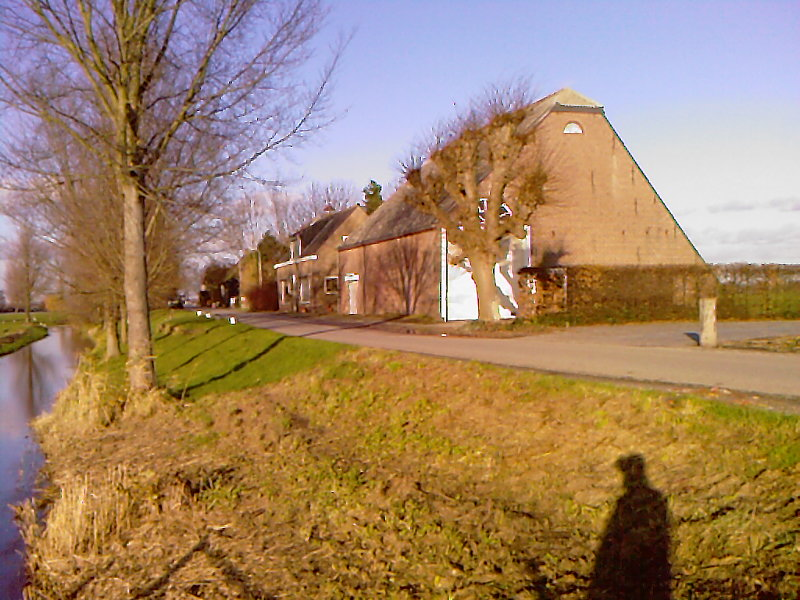

- Location in the province of South Holland in the Netherlands Location in the Netherlands
- Coordinates: 51°47′20″N 4°30′58″E
- Country: Netherlands
- Province: South Holland
- Municipality: Hoeksche Waard

Zwanegat is a hamlet in the Dutch province of South Holland and is part of the municipality Hoeksche Waard. Zwanegat lies between Westmaas and Sint Anthoniepolder.

Zwanegat is not a statistical entity, and considered part of Maasdam and Strijen. It has no place name signs, and consists of about 40 houses.

== Gallery ==
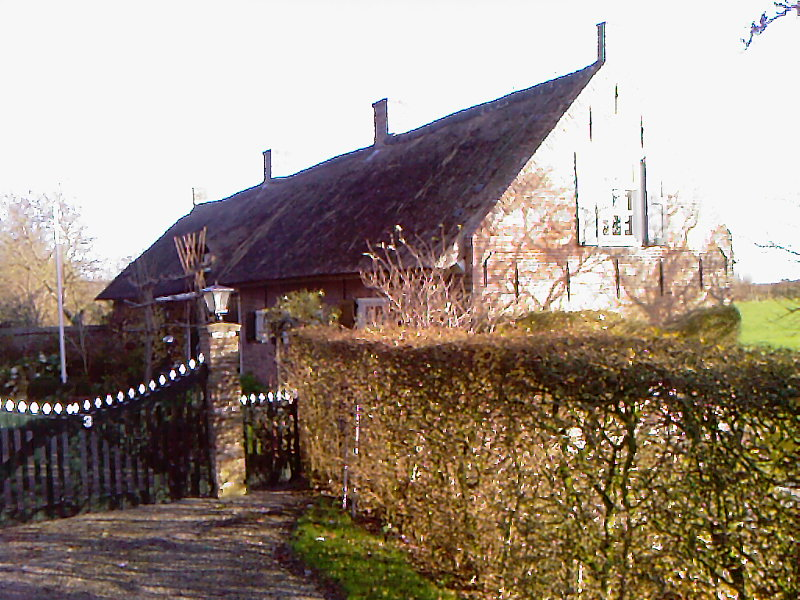
Farm in Zwanegat
