= Schenkeldijk, Binnenmaas =

Schenkeldijk
- Hamlet
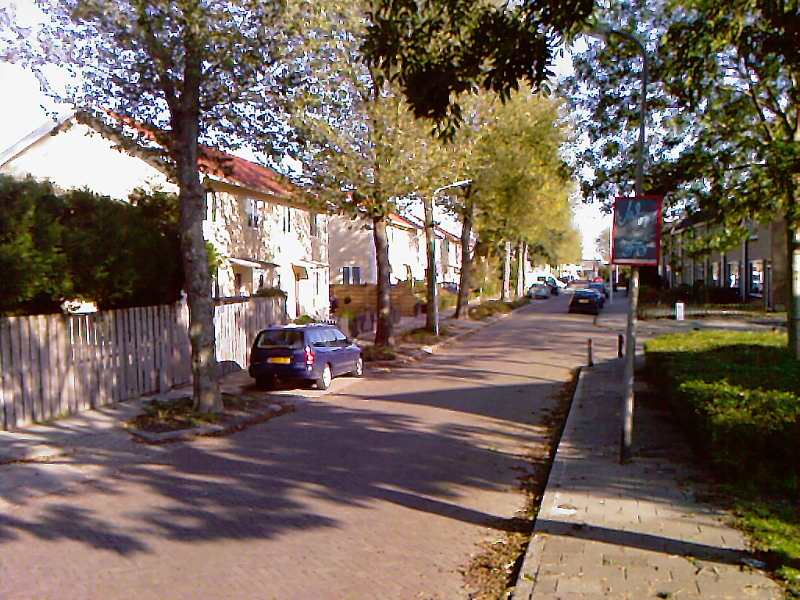
- Zweedsestraat (Swedish street)

- Location in the province of South Holland in the Netherlands Location in the Netherlands
- Coordinates: 51°44′28″N 4°36′15″E
- Country: Netherlands
- Province: South Holland
- Municipality: Hoeksche Waard

Schenkeldijk is a hamlet in the Dutch province of South Holland and is part of the municipality Hoeksche Waard. The village lies 1 km south east of the village Mookhoek and east of Strijen.

Schenkeldijk was severely affected by the North Sea flood of 1953. Many wooden houses were donated to the village from Sweden and placed in what is nowadays called Zweedsestraat (Swedish street).

Schenkeldijk is not a statistical entity, and considered part of 's-Gravendeel and Strijen. It has place name signs, and consists of about 200 houses.
