= Kuipersveer =

- Hamlet
- Location in the province of South Holland in the Netherlands Location in the Netherlands
- Coordinates: 51°49′16″N 4°33′20″E
- Country: Netherlands
- Province: South Holland
- Municipality: Hoeksche Waard

Kuipersveer is a hamlet in the Dutch province of South Holland and is part of the municipality Hoeksche Waard. The village lies next to the Oude Maas between the villages of Puttershoek and Heinenoord.

Kuipersveer is not a statistical entity, and considered part of Heinenoord. It has no place name signs, and consists of about 20 houses. It used to have a sugar factory, but it has been turned into a nature area.
