= De Wacht =

- Hamlet
- Location in the province of South Holland in the Netherlands Location in the Netherlands
- Coordinates: 51°45′05″N 4°37′37″E
- Country: Netherlands
- Province: South Holland
- Municipality: Hoeksche Waard

De Wacht is a hamlet in the Dutch province of South Holland and is part of the municipality Hoeksche Waard. The village lies next to the Dordtse Kil.

De Wacht is not a statistical entity, and considered part of 's-Gravendeel. It has place name signs, and consists of about 25 houses.
