= Greup =

- Hamlet
- Location in the province of South Holland in the Netherlands Location in the Netherlands
- Coordinates: 51°47′11″N 4°26′10″E
- Country: Netherlands
- Province: South Holland
- Municipality: Hoeksche Waard

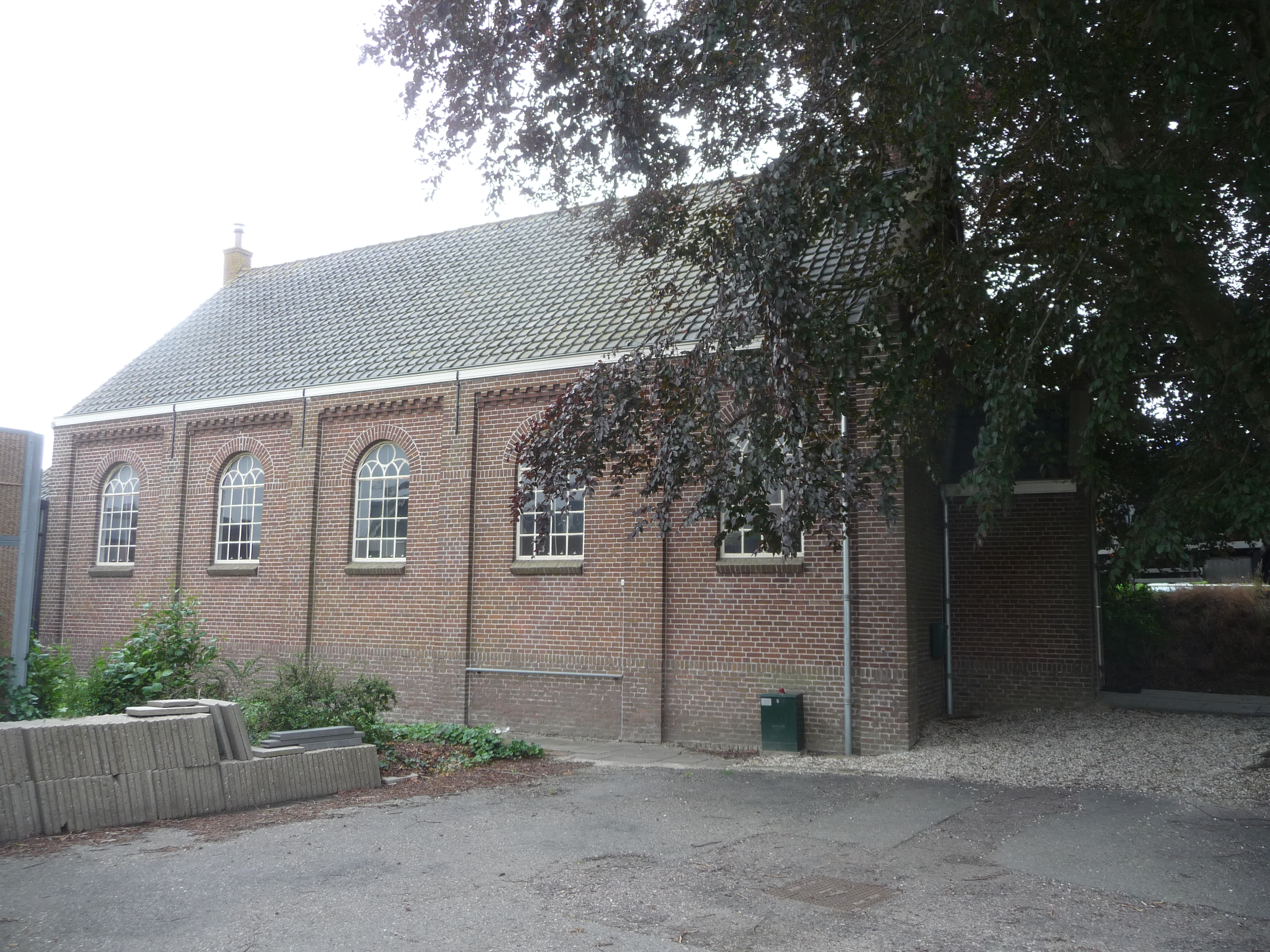

Greup is a hamlet on a dike in the Dutch province of South Holland. The village lies in the municipality of Hoeksche Waard.

Greup is not a statistical entity, and considered part of Mijnsheerenland. It had place name signs, but they disappeared in 2019. In 1922, a church was built.
