= Reedijk =

- Hamlet
- Location in the province of South Holland in the Netherlands Location in the Netherlands
- Coordinates: 51°48′59″N 4°27′43″E
- Country: Netherlands
- Province: South Holland
- Municipality: Hoeksche Waard

Reedijk is a hamlet in the Dutch province of South Holland and is part of the municipality Hoeksche Waard. Reedijk lies 1.5 km east of Oud-Beijerland.

Reedijk is not a statistical entity, and considered part of Heinenoord and Mijnsheerenland. It has place name signs, and consists of about 40 houses.
