= Mookhoek =

- Village
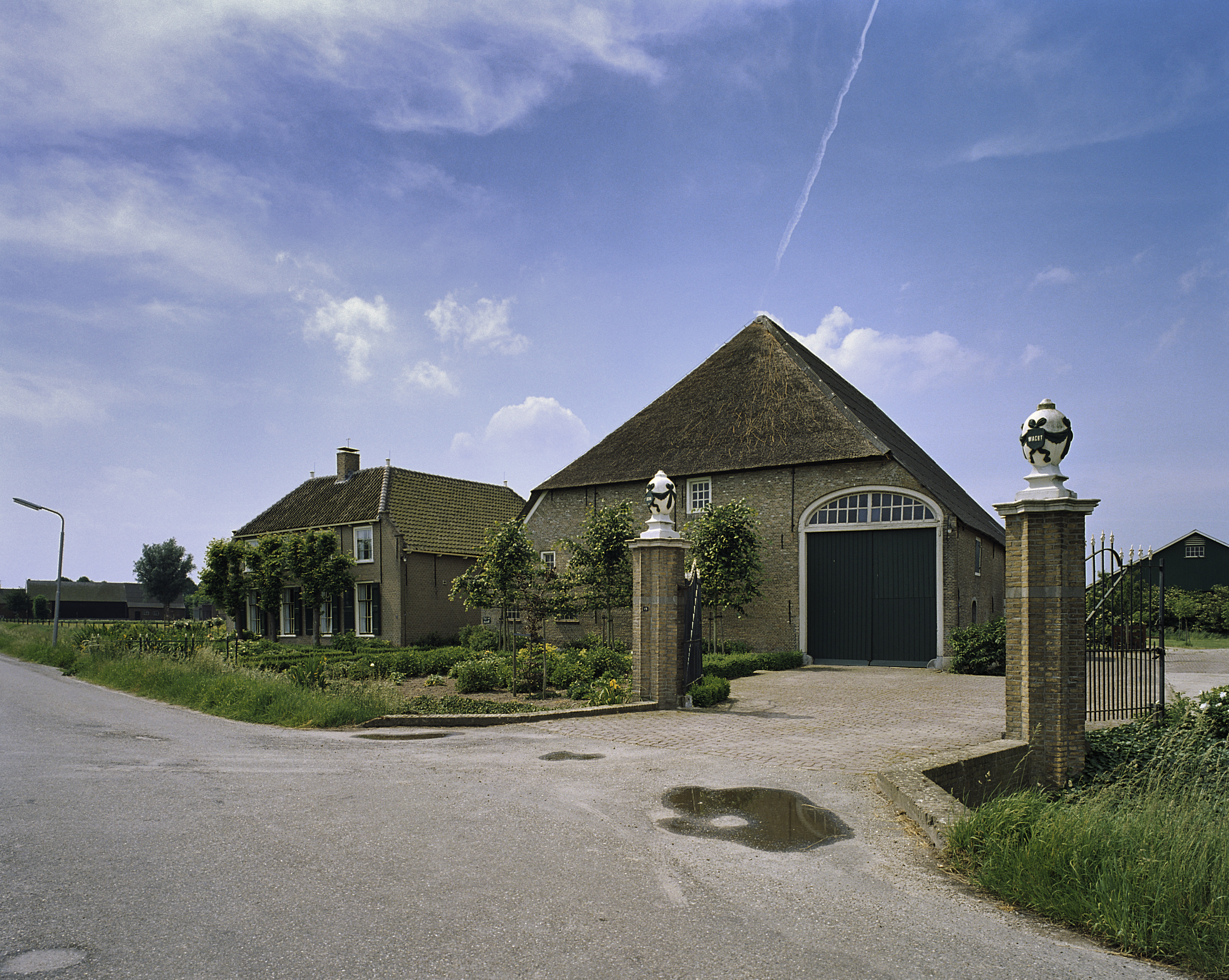

- Location in the province of South Holland in the Netherlands Location in the Netherlands
- Coordinates: 51°45′10″N 4°35′45″E
- Country: Netherlands
- Province: South Holland
- Municipality: Hoeksche Waard

Mookhoek is a village in the Dutch province of South Holland and is part of the municipality of Hoeksche Waard. Mookhoek lies 2.5 km from the town Strijen. Until 1984 Mookhoek belonged to the former municipality Maasdam. Mookhoek had 479 inhabitants on 1 January 2007.

The village was first mentioned in 1773 as Mook Hoek, and is a combination of stomach and corner. It was named after to eponymous polder. Mookhoek was home to 293 people in 1840. Nowadays, it consists of about 180 houses. A Dutch Reformed church was built in 1906.

== Gallery ==
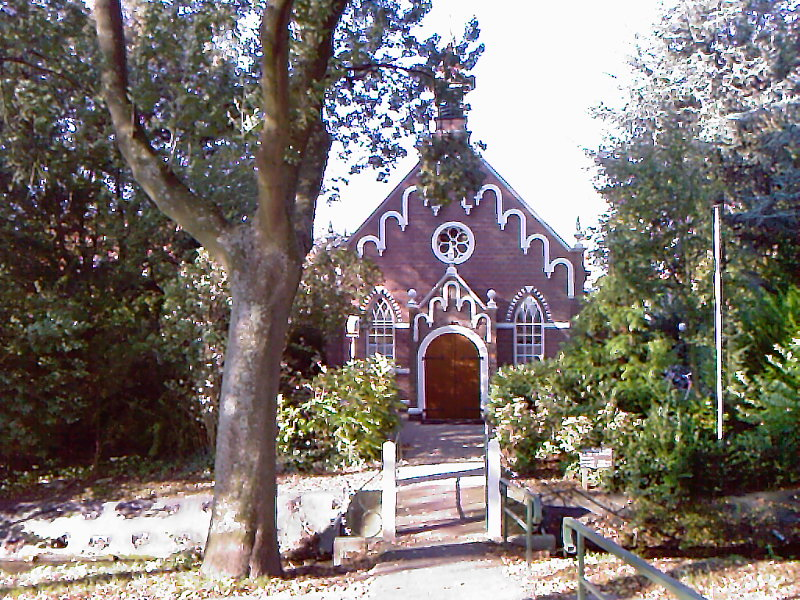
Church of Mookhoek
