= Schenkeldijk, Korendijk =

Schenkeldijk
- Hamlet
- Location in the province of South Holland in the Netherlands Location in the Netherlands
- Coordinates: 51°44′43″N 4°22′56″E
- Country: Netherlands
- Province: South Holland
- Municipality: Hoeksche Waard
- Time zone: UTC+1 (CET)
  - Summer (DST): UTC+2 (CEST)

Schenkeldijk is a hamlet in the Dutch province of South Holland. It is a part of the municipality of Hoeksche Waard, and lies about 11 km south of Spijkenisse.

Schenkeldijk is not a statistical entity, and considered part of Zuid-Beijerland. It has no place name signs, and consists of about 40 houses.
