= Puttershoek =

- Village
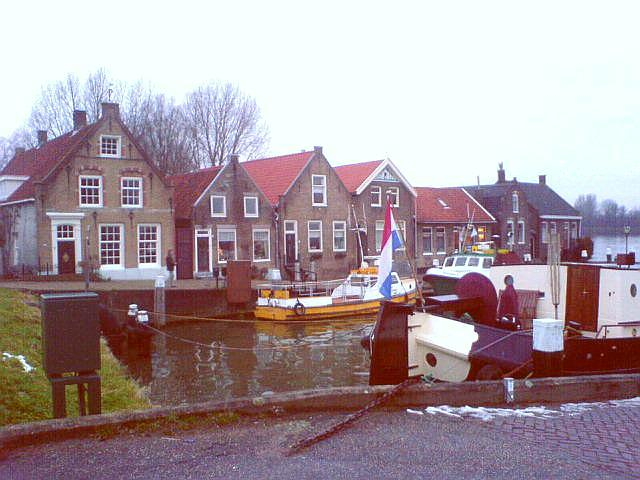
- The 16th-century harbour of Puttershoek

- Flag

- Location in the province of South Holland in the Netherlands Location in the Netherlands
- Coordinates: 51°48′N 4°34′E
- Country: Netherlands
- Province: South Holland
- Municipality: Hoeksche Waard

Area
  - Total: 5.64 km^{2} (2.18 sq mi)
- Elevation: 0.4 m (1.3 ft)

Population (2021)
  - Total: 7,205
  - Density: 1,280/km^{2} (3,310/sq mi)
- Time zone: UTC+1 (CET)
  - Summer (DST): UTC+2 (CEST)
- Postal code: 3297
- Dialing code: 0186

Puttershoek is a village and former municipality in the western Netherlands. It is located on the banks of the Oude Maas, on the island Hoeksche Waard, in the province of South Holland. On 1 January 1984, the municipality of Puttershoek was merged with several others into Binnenmaas. With 6,293 inhabitants (1 January 2005) Puttershoek was the largest settlement in the municipality of Binnenmaas until 's-Gravendeel joined Binnenmaas in 2007. Since 1 January 2019, it is part of the new municipality Hoeksche Waard.

== History ==
Before the St. Elizabeth's flood (1421) a township named Hoecke was located on the spot of the present-day town. The name Hoecke (meaning Corner) is probably derived from the sharp angle the dike around the former Grote or Zuid-Hollandsche Waard island took here. After the St. Elizabeth's flood, the land was owned by the Lords of Putten, who loaned it to a vassal lord. The first four vassal lords of Hoecke were all named Pieter. It remains unclear if the name Puttershoek is taken from Pietershoeck, or if it is a reference to the Lords of Putten.

Until the 19th century, Puttershoek was a small and remote village, where reed cutting was the main source of income. However, in 1912 a large sugar beet processing plant was built in the village, bringing not only employment and a sweet odour during fall, but also employees from the Catholic North Brabant province. A thriving Catholic community was founded in the very Protestant village, building one of only two Catholic churches on the Hoeksche Waard island. During World War II, V-1 missiles were launched from the factory by the German occupying forces. The factory was bombed, and was rebuilt after the war. At the end of 2004, the sugar mill closed its doors. Most of its buildings were demolished in 2012.

Puttershoek was partially flooded during the big North Sea flood of 1953. After the flood the dike along the Oude Maas was raised. For this, nearly half of the old town (the Weverseinde dike) was torn down between 1964 and 1966. The monumental 17th-century farm Rustenburg burnt down in 1997 and was demolished.

== Architecture ==
Puttershoek retains several recognised architectural monuments, most of which are concentrated around the small river harbour on the Oude Maas and the Schouteneinde dike. The Protestant church was built in 1839, replacing a 15th-century church in the same location. Part of the church tower and the interior date back to the previous structure. The former town hall was built in 1835 in the neoclassicist style. The port is lined with 17th-century houses with characteristic gables. The old post office Het Springende Peerd, with stepped gable and gable stone, dates from 1648. There are several large 18th- and 19th-century farms along the Arent van Lierstraat. The windmill De Lelie, on the Molendijk towards 's-Gravendeel, was built in 1836 and renovated in 1986. In the lower part of town there are several wooden houses, donated by the Norwegian government after World War II. The old pumping station Het Hooft van Benthuizen was built in 1870 for drainage of the polder Nieuw-Bonaventura and the canal Boezemvliet. It is due to be demolished, to make way for housing development.

== Famous residents ==
The most renowned inhabitant is Kees Verkerk who won many speed skating medals including a gold medal in the 1968 Winter Olympics. Presently, Verkerk lives in Norway, but his house still hosts the cafe and bar his father owned for many years, Het Veerhuis, found at the harbour-side.

== Gallery ==
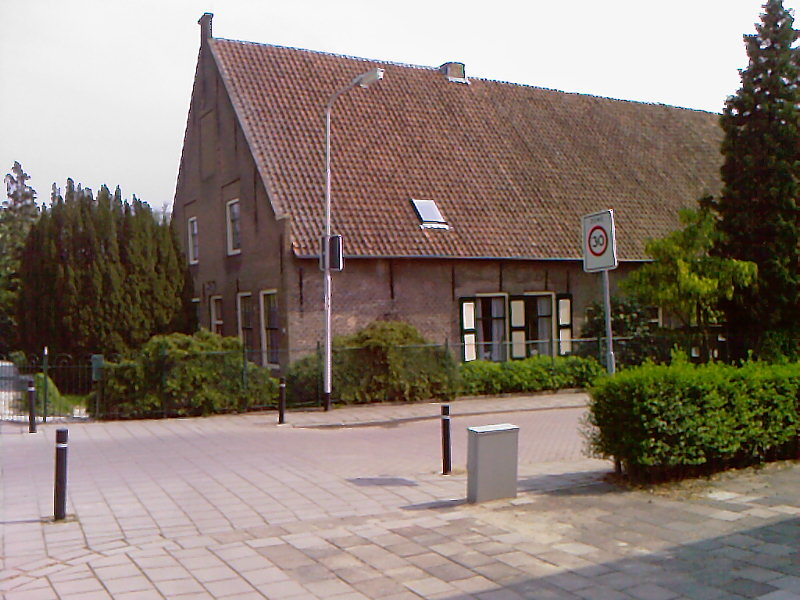
Typical 18th-century farm

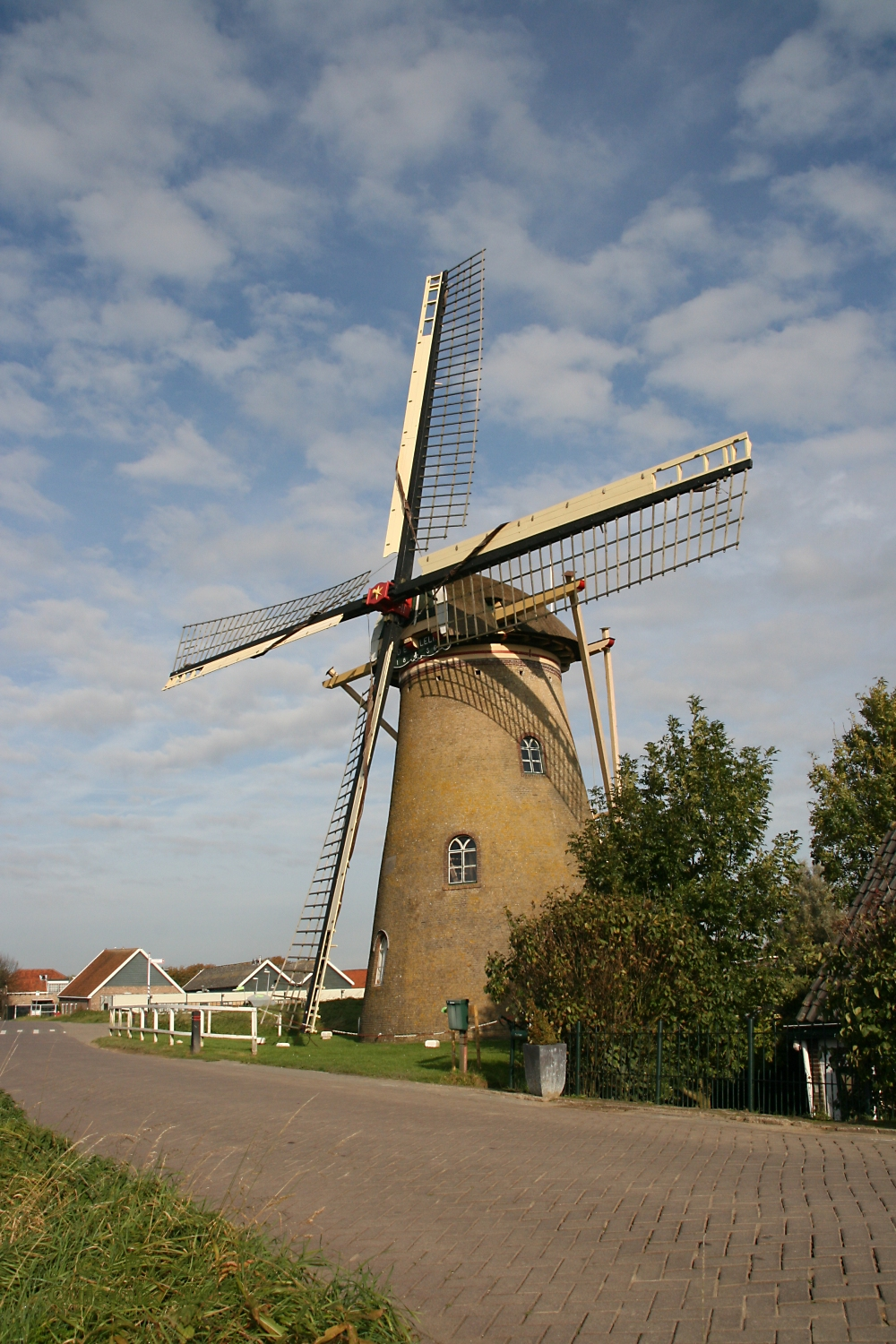
Wind mill De Lelie
