= Westmaas =

- Village
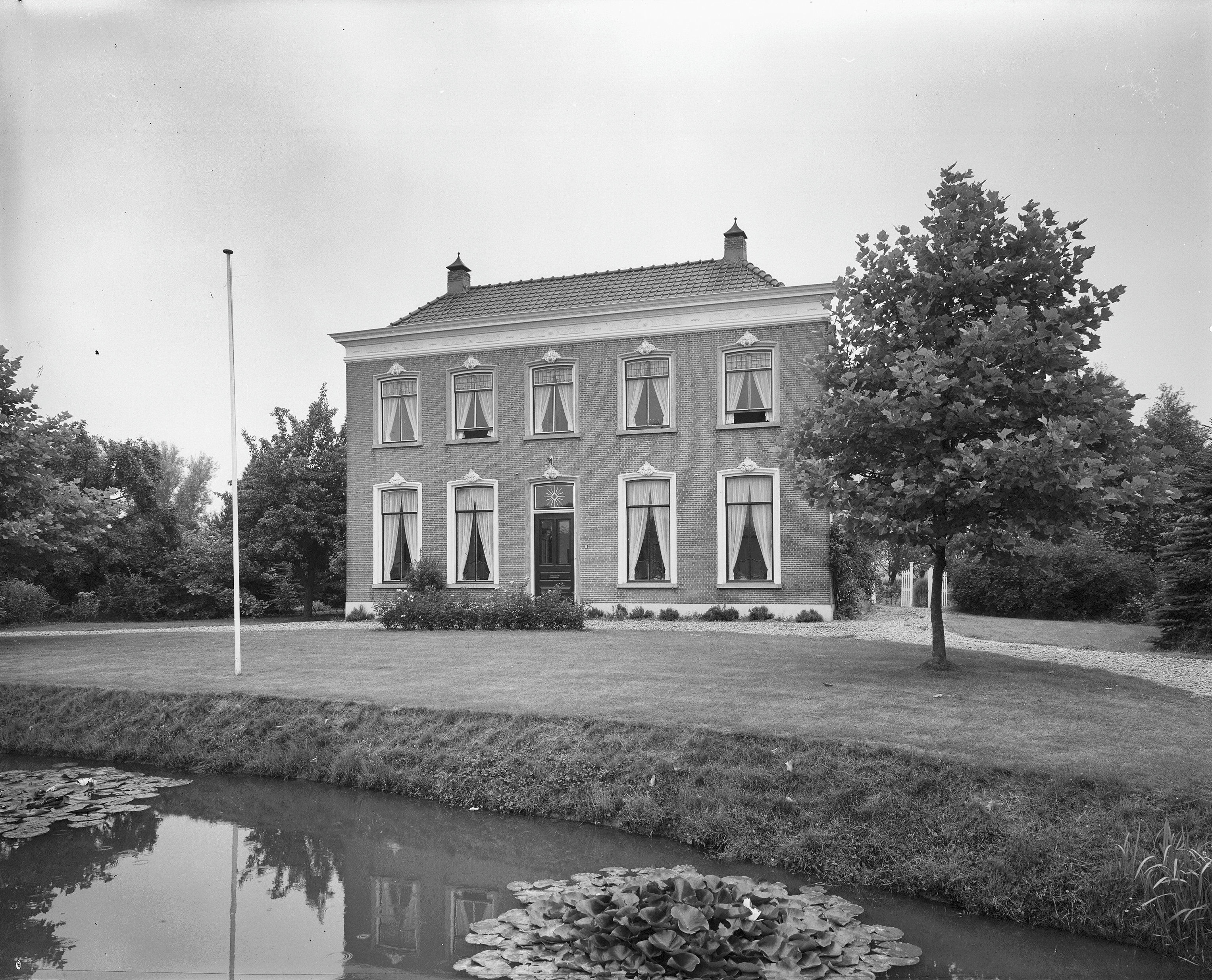
- Clergy house of Westmaas

- Location in the province of South Holland in the Netherlands Location in the Netherlands
- Coordinates: 51°47′N 4°28′E
- Country: Netherlands
- Province: South Holland
- Municipality: Hoeksche Waard

Area
  - Total: 7.39 km^{2} (2.85 sq mi)
- Elevation: −0.5 m (−1.6 ft)

Population (2021)
  - Total: 2,095
  - Density: 283/km^{2} (734/sq mi)
- Time zone: UTC+1 (CET)
  - Summer (DST): UTC+2 (CEST)
- Postal code: 3273
- Dialing code: 0186

Westmaas (Dutch pronunciation: [ʋɛstˈmaːs]) is a village in the Dutch province of South Holland. It is located about 14 km south of the city of Rotterdam, next to Mijnsheerenland in the municipality of Hoeksche Waard. In 2020, the population was 2,065.

Westmaas developed after the Munnikenland was enclosed by a dike in 1439. The village was founded by Carthusian monks. It became an independent parish in 1458. The Dutch Reformed church is an aisleless church built in 1651. It was restored between 1966 and 1967.

Westmaas was home to 768 people in 1840. Westmaas was a separate municipality between 1817 and 1984, when it became part of Binnenmaas. Since 1 January 2019, it is part of the new municipality Hoeksche Waard.

Dutch Motorsports team MP Motorsport is headquartered in Westmaas.

== Gallery ==
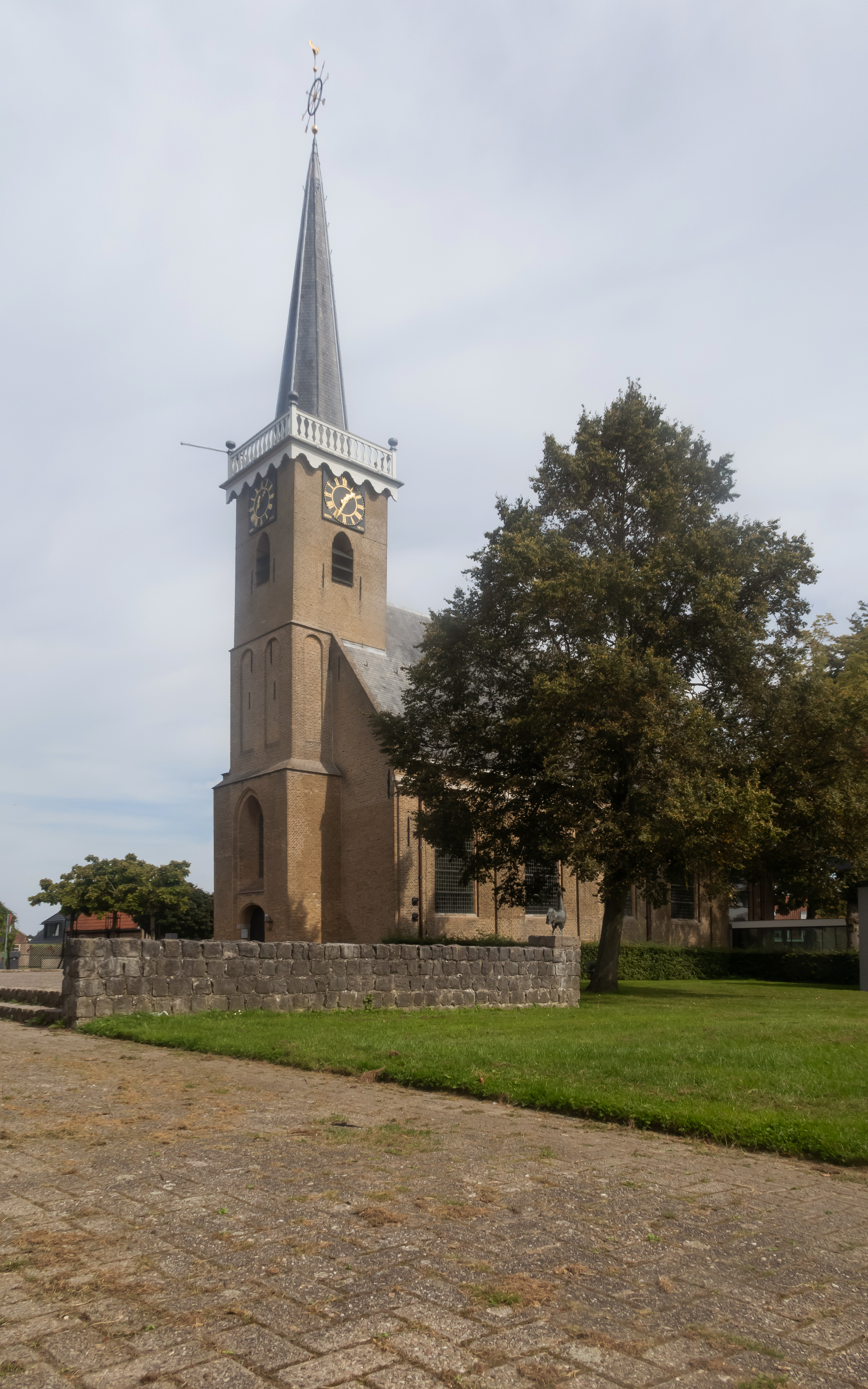
Westmaas, reformed church

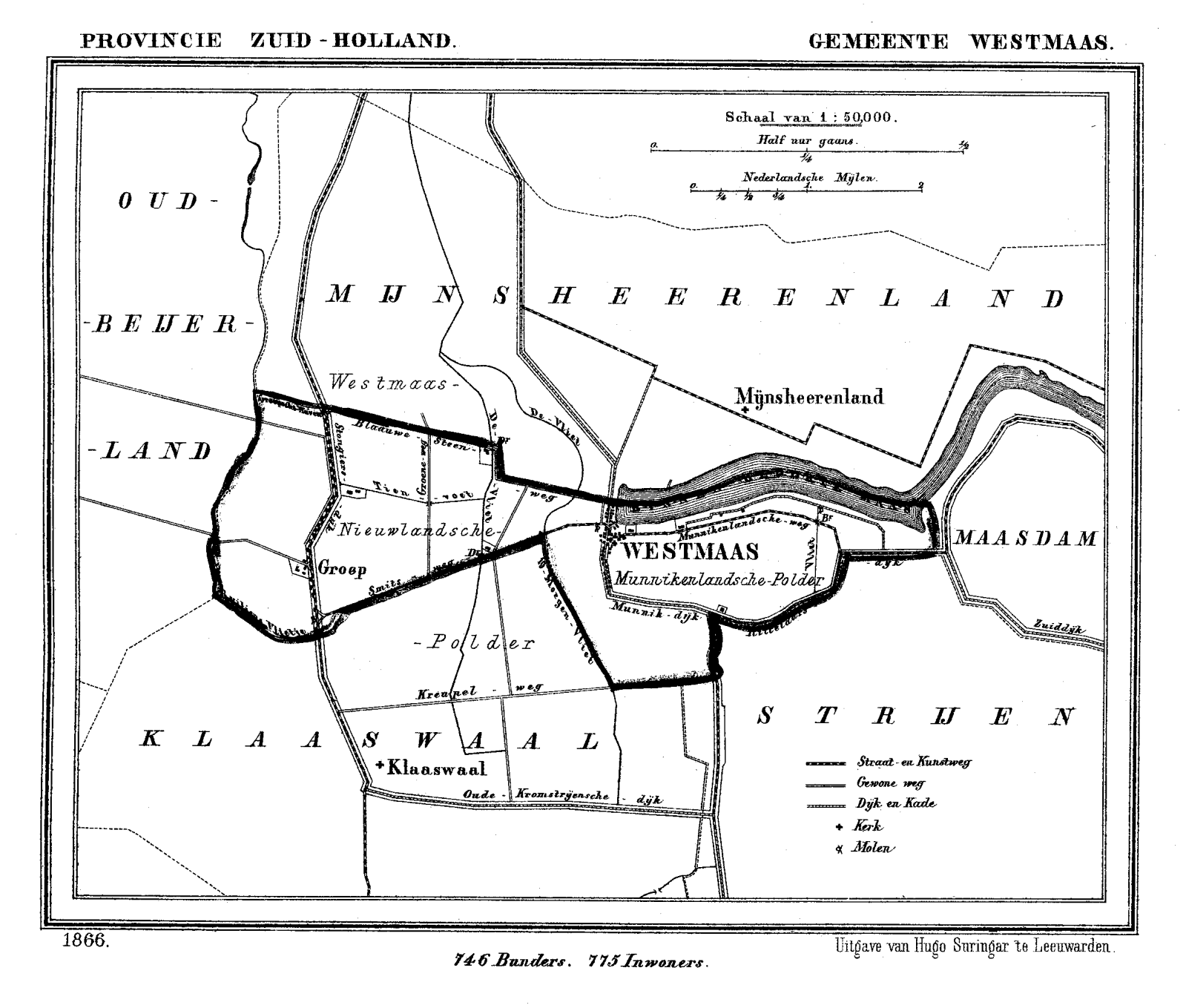
Old map from 1866

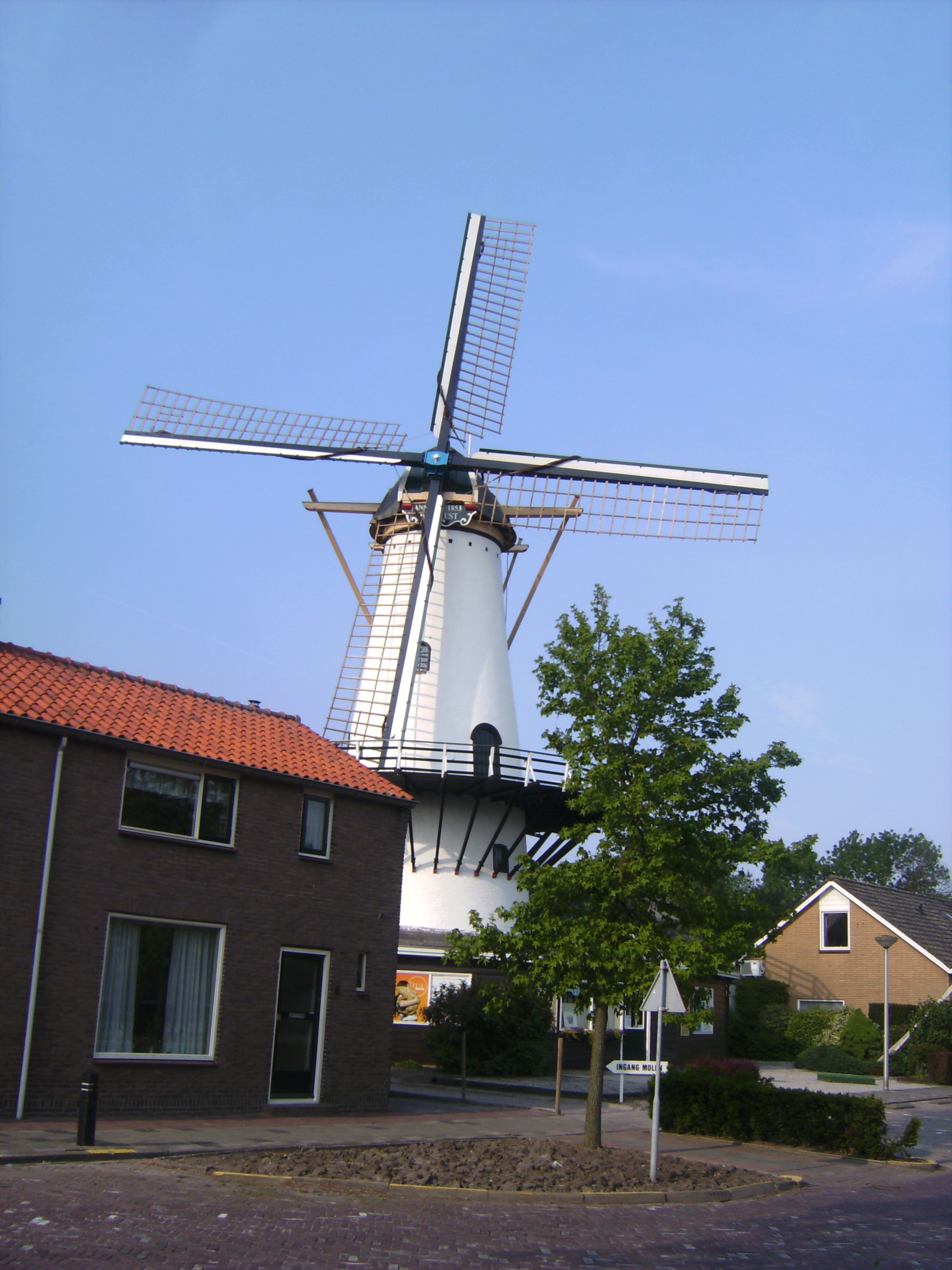
Windmill Windlust
