= 's-Gravendeel =

- Village
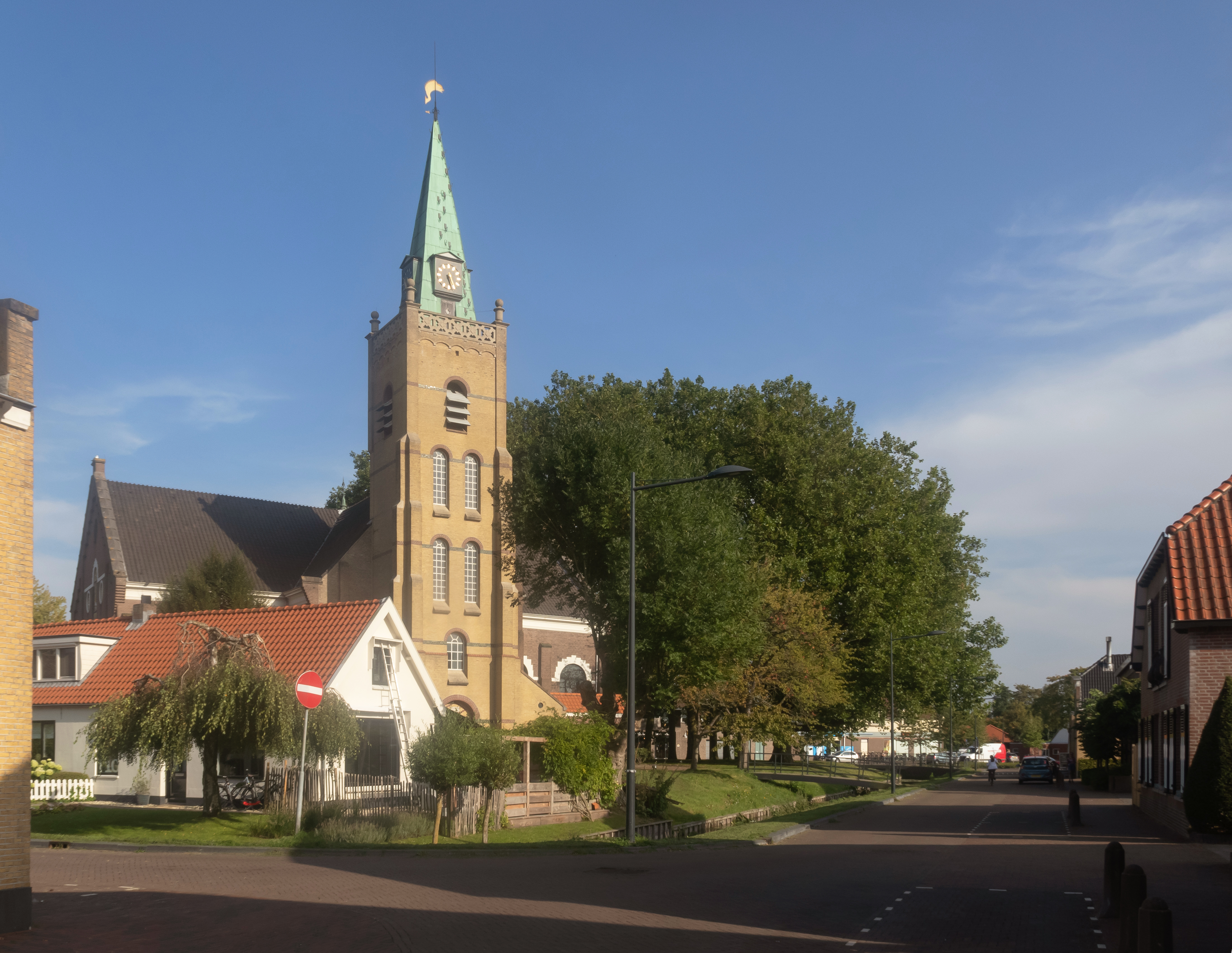
- Dutch Reformed church

- Location in the province of South Holland in the Netherlands Location in the Netherlands
- Coordinates: 51°47′N 4°37′E
- Country: Netherlands
- Province: South Holland
- Municipality: Hoeksche Waard

Area
  - Total: 20.70 km^{2} (7.99 sq mi)
- Elevation: 0.2 m (0.66 ft)

Population (2021)
  - Total: 9,000
  - Density: 430/km^{2} (1,100/sq mi)
- Time zone: UTC+1 (CET)
  - Summer (DST): UTC+2 (CEST)
- Postal code: 3295
- Dialing code: 078

's-Gravendeel (Dutch pronunciation: [ˌsxraːvə(n)ˈdeːl]) is a village and former municipality in the western Netherlands, in the province of South Holland. 's-Gravendeel is on the eastern side of Hoeksche Waard Island on the river Dordtsche Kil. It is connected to Dordrecht by means of the Kil Tunnel.

The village was first mentioned in 1645 as Schravendeel, and means "settlement of the Count (of Holland)". The village was founded after the new polder Nieuw-Bonaventura was drained in 1593. It used to be property of the States of Holland. In 1731, the village was sold to Dordrecht. 's-Gravendeel developed into the centre of the flax industry.

The Dutch Reformed church is a cruciform church built in 1905 after the 1637 church had burnt down. The tower was destroyed in 1945 and rebuilt in 1951.

's-Gravendeel was home to 928 people in 1840. It was affected by the North Sea flood of 1953. In 1970, the old harbour was filled up and a new harbour was built on the Dordtsche Kil.

The municipality of 's-Gravendeel was merged with Binnenmaas on 1 January 2007. Since 1 January 2019, it is part of the new municipality Hoeksche Waard.

== Gallery ==
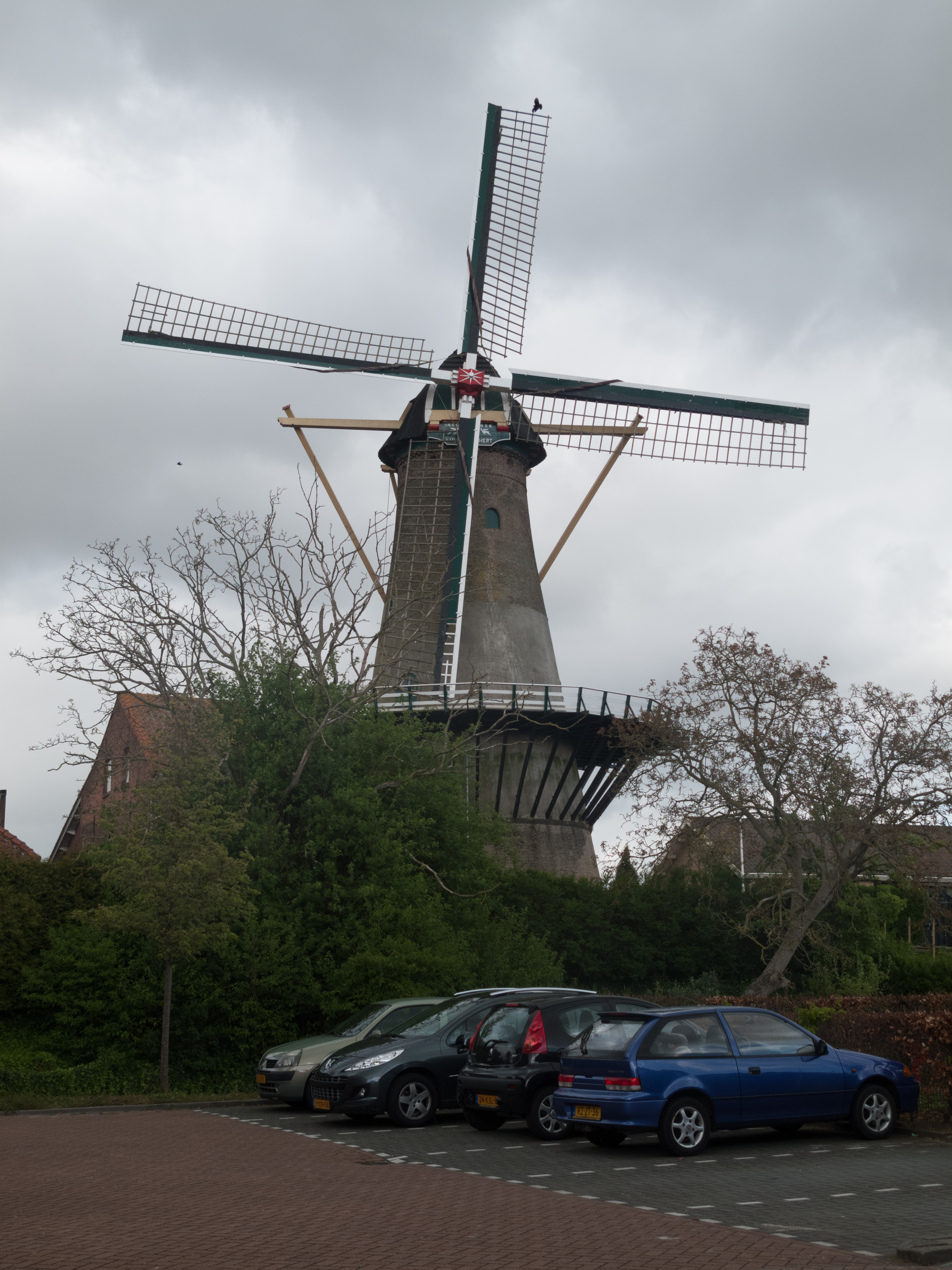
Windmill: korenmolen het Vliegend Hert

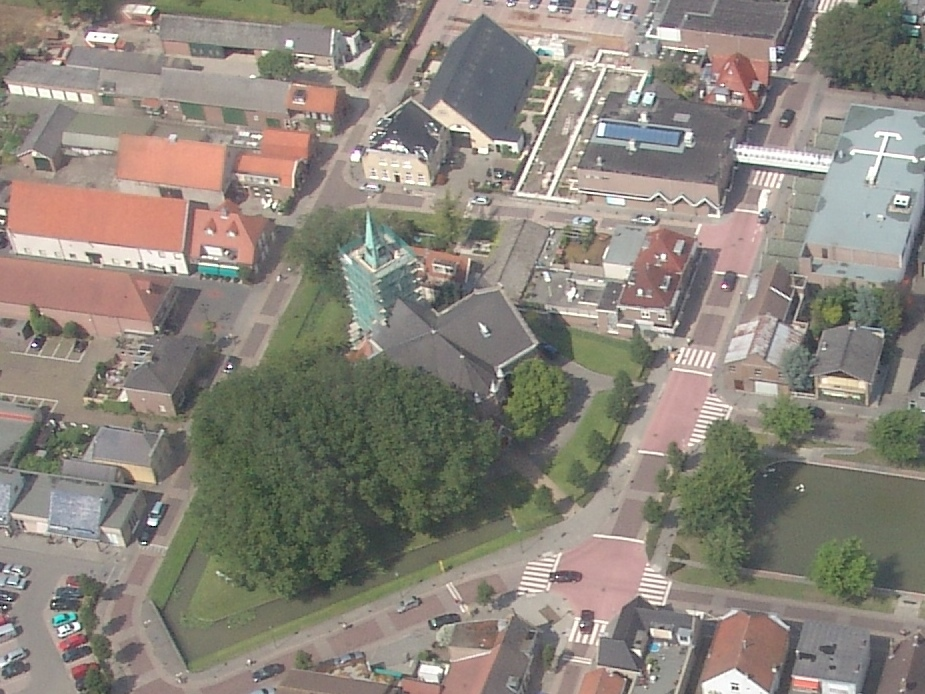
Reformed church in 's-Gravendeel with its notable church moat
