= Mijnsheerenland =

- Village
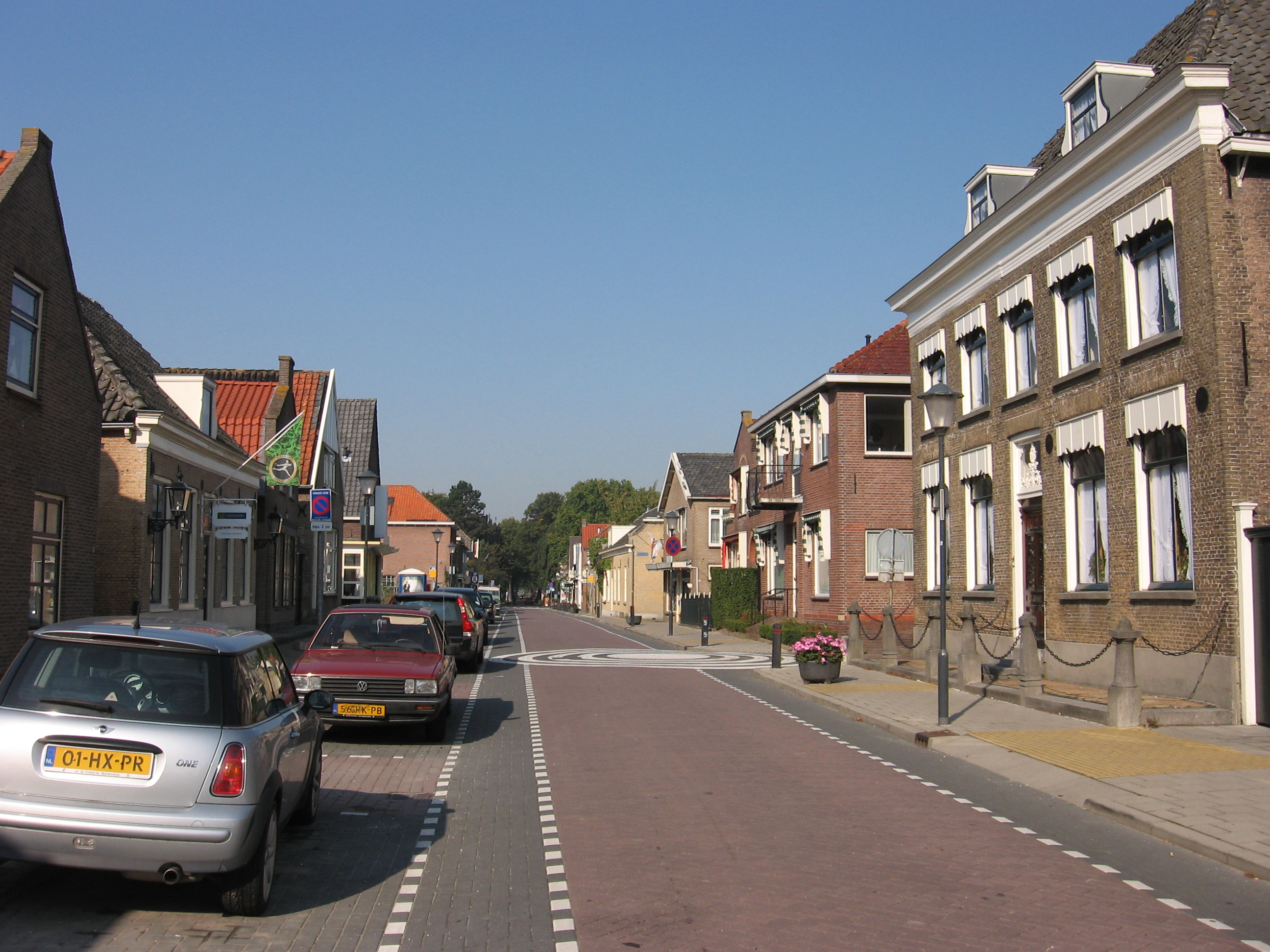
- Mijnsheerenland Wilhelminastraat, 2007

- Flag Coat of arms

- Location in the province of South Holland in the Netherlands Location in the Netherlands
- Coordinates: 51°48′N 4°29′E
- Country: Netherlands
- Province: South Holland
- Municipality: Hoeksche Waard

Area
  - Total: 16.03 km^{2} (6.19 sq mi)
- Elevation: −0.3 m (−0.98 ft)

Population (2021)
  - Total: 4,745
  - Density: 296.0/km^{2} (766.7/sq mi)
- Time zone: UTC+1 (CET)
  - Summer (DST): UTC+2 (CEST)
- Postal code: 3271
- Dialing code: 0186

Mijnsheerenland is a village and a former municipality on the Hoeksche Waard island in the Dutch province of South Holland with 4,435 inhabitants (as of 1 January 2006). It is located on the shores of the Binnenbedijkte Maas (Lake Binnenmaas), about 14 km south of the city of Rotterdam, in the municipality of Hoeksche Waard. It was the only village in the former municipality Binnenmaas not built next to a dyke.

The main street of Mijnsheerenland is the Raadhuislaan. This street used to be dominated by farmhouses, but in recent years many of them were demolished and replaced by modern homes as Mijnsheerenland became preferred by upmarket house buyers.

== History ==
After the St. Elizabeth's flood the former land of Schobbe en Everocken was re-dyked in 1437-1438 by the knight Lodewijk Praet of Moerkerken; therefore, the village is often called Mijnsheerenland van Moerkerken. The name of the village (meaning My Lord's Land in English) doesn't have a religious background but states the factual situation of the land belonging to its Lord, Praet of Moerkerken.

== Sights ==
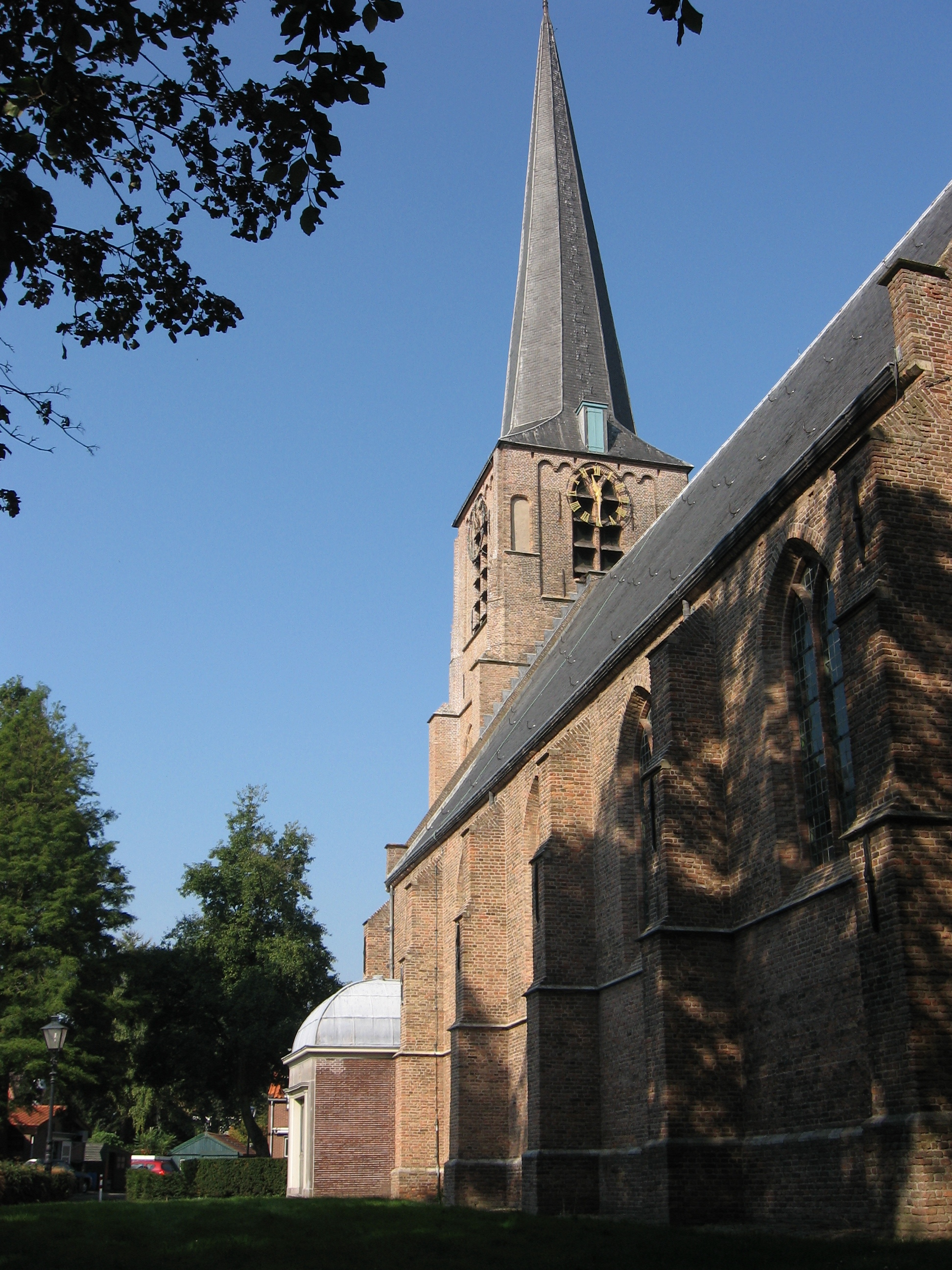
Laurentius church

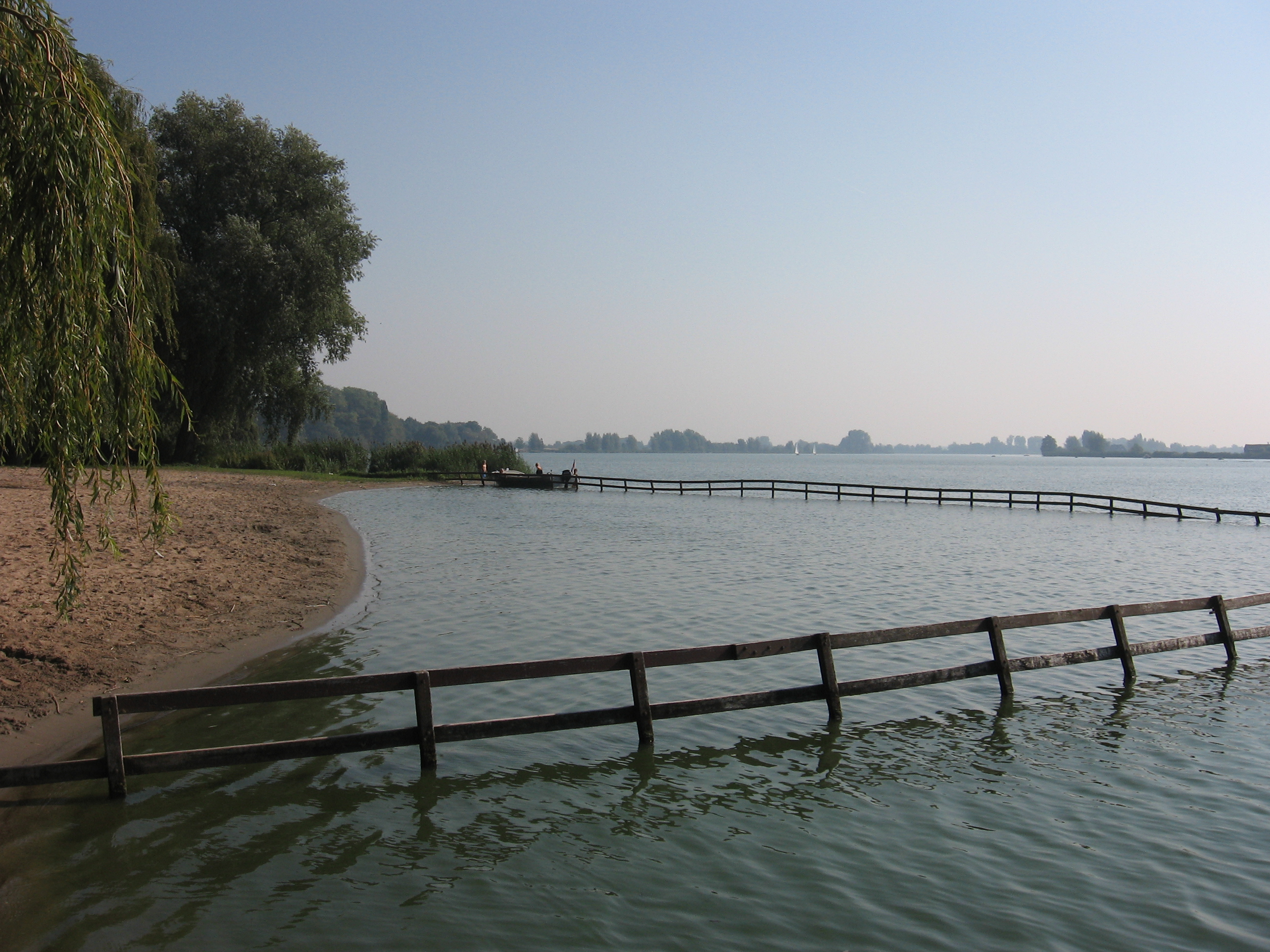
Lake Binnenmaas

=== Hof van Moerkerken ===
Next to the centre of the village lies the Hof van Moerkerken, a medieval buitenplaats on which an 18th-century mansion is located. The Hof van Moerkerken was where the Lord of the manor lived.

The Dutch writer Frederik van Eeden lived on the Hof van Moerkerken in the 19th century. His famous novel Van de koele meren des doods was written there, and it was the filming location for the 1982 Dutch movie based on the novel. The Hof is privately owned and therefore not accessible to the public; its garden, however, is open to the public on Open Monument Day.

=== Laurentius Church ===
The Laurentius Church is a gothic church built in 1445, and is located in the middle of the village. The gothic architectural style is unusual for the Hoeksche Waard.

=== Windmills ===
There are two windmills in the village area: the grist mill De Goede Hoop (somewhat hidden within the village), and the post mill Oostmolen outside the core village of Mijnsheerenland. The latter is a drainage mill, and was used until 1948 for draining water from the Moerkerken polder.

=== Lake Binnenmaas ===
Lake Binnenmaas is a lake to the south of Mijnsheerenland, providing a small beach and a yachting club located near the village.

== Notable people ==
- Gerard Cox (1940-2025), singer, actor and director
- Emely de Heus (born 2003), motor racing driver
- Nijs Korevaar (1927-2016), water polo player
- Wietske van Leeuwen (born 1965), ceramist
- Patrick van Luijk (born 1984), sprinter
- Lennart Stekelenburg (born 1986), swimmer

== Gallery ==
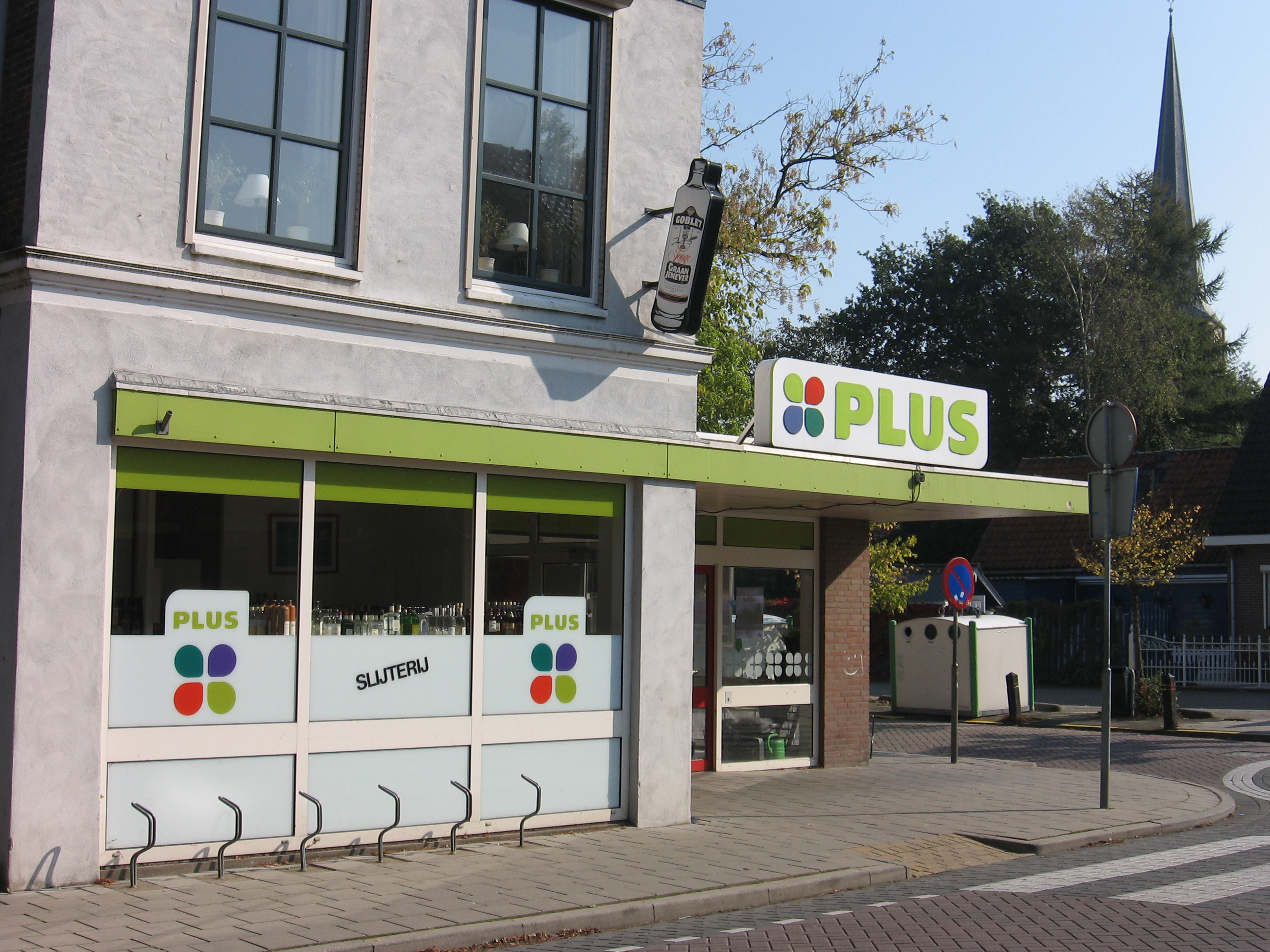
Supermarket Plus, 2007

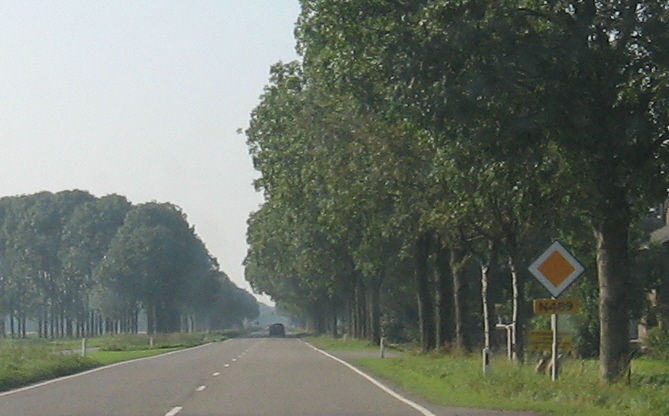
N489 near Mijnsheerenland

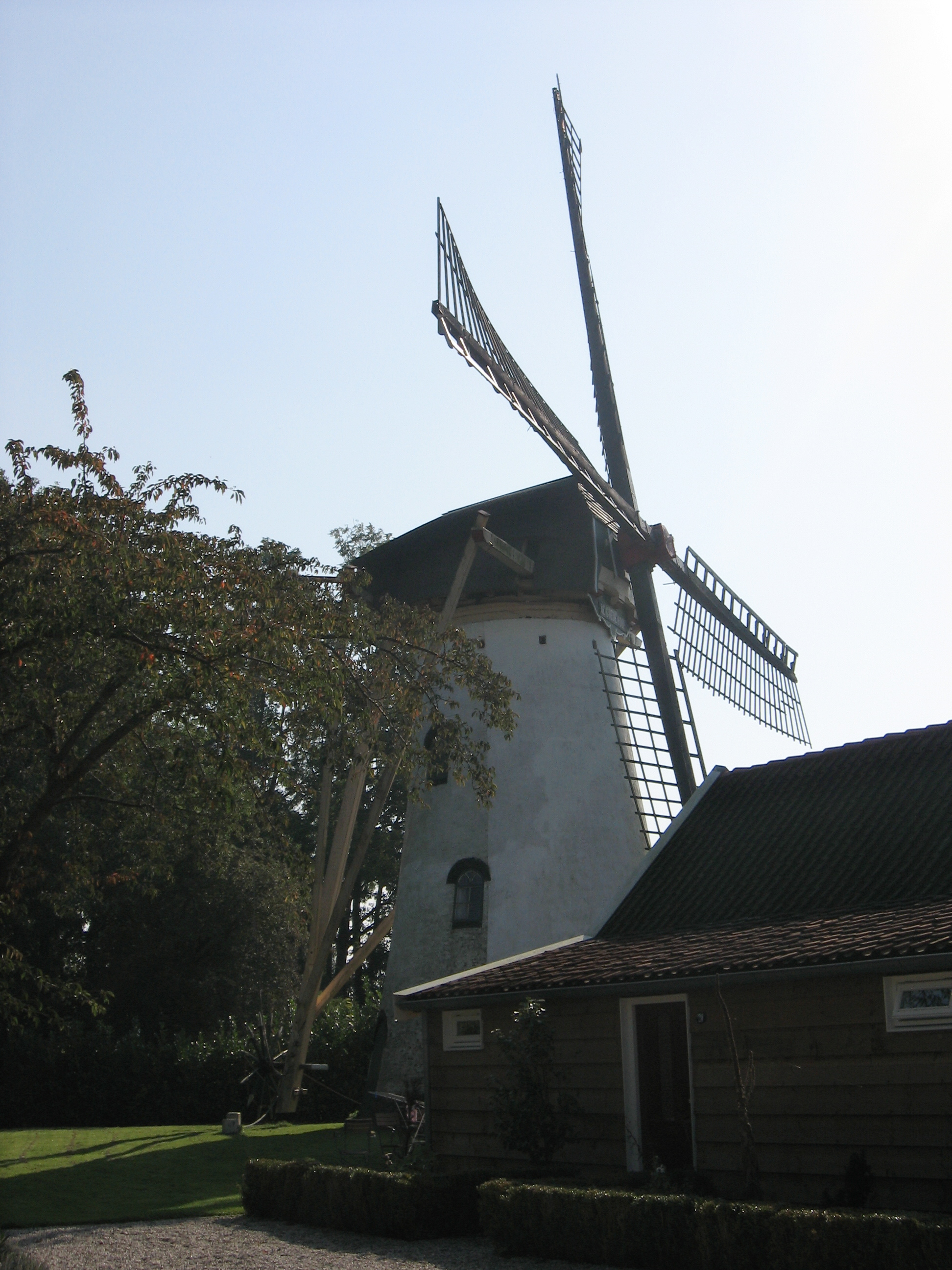
Windmill De Goede Hoop

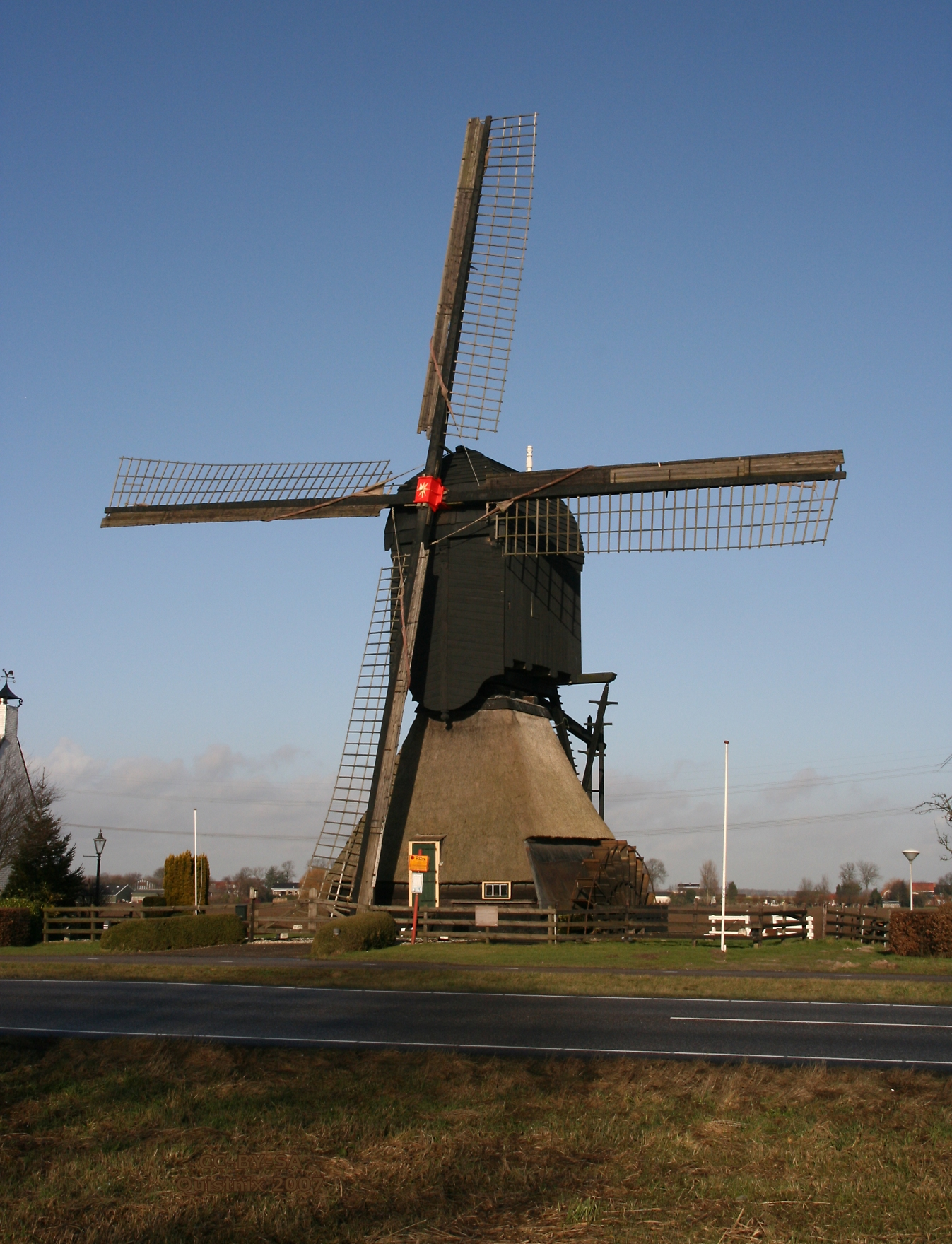
Windmill De Oostmolen

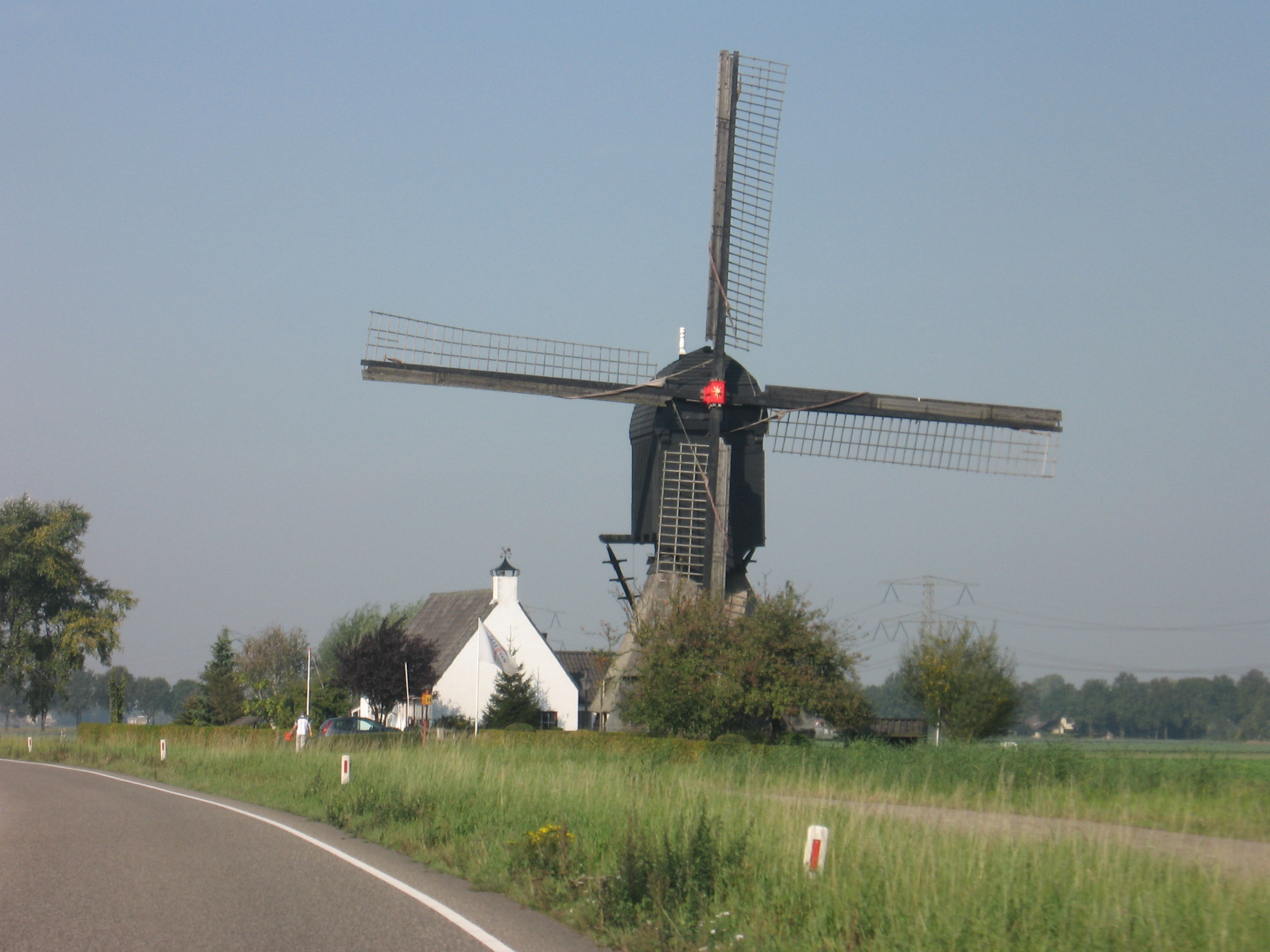
Windmill De Oostmolen next to the N217

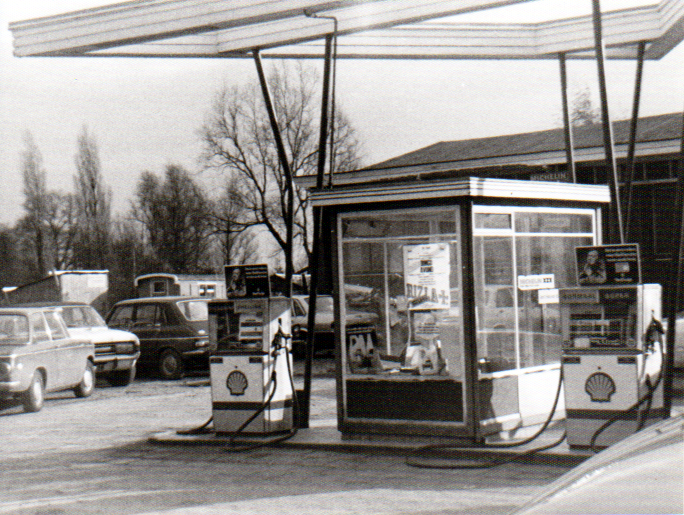
Shell filling station and garage, late 1970s

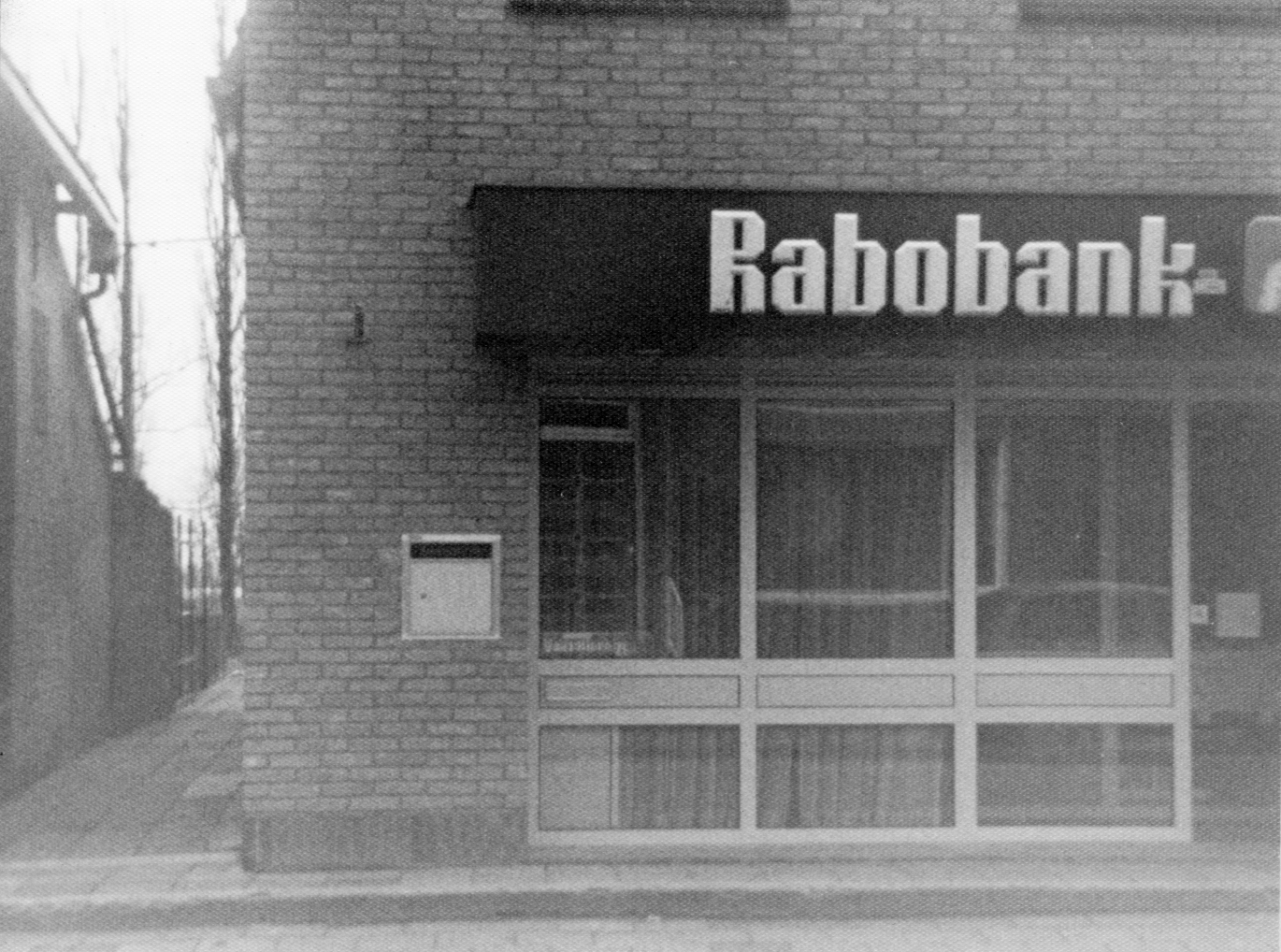
Rabobank office, late 1970s

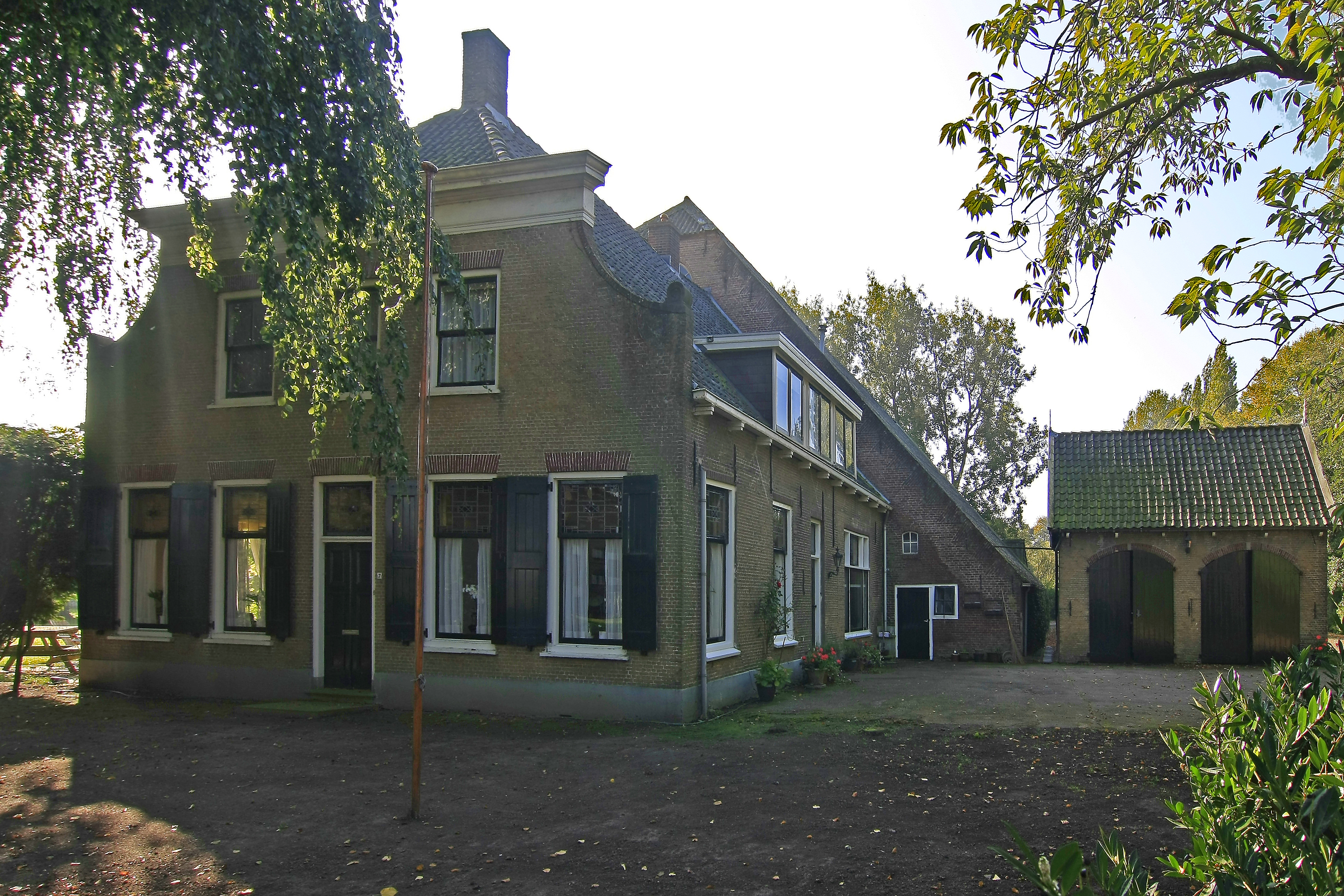
Farm on the Raadhuislaan
