= Hoeksche Waard (municipality) =

- Municipality
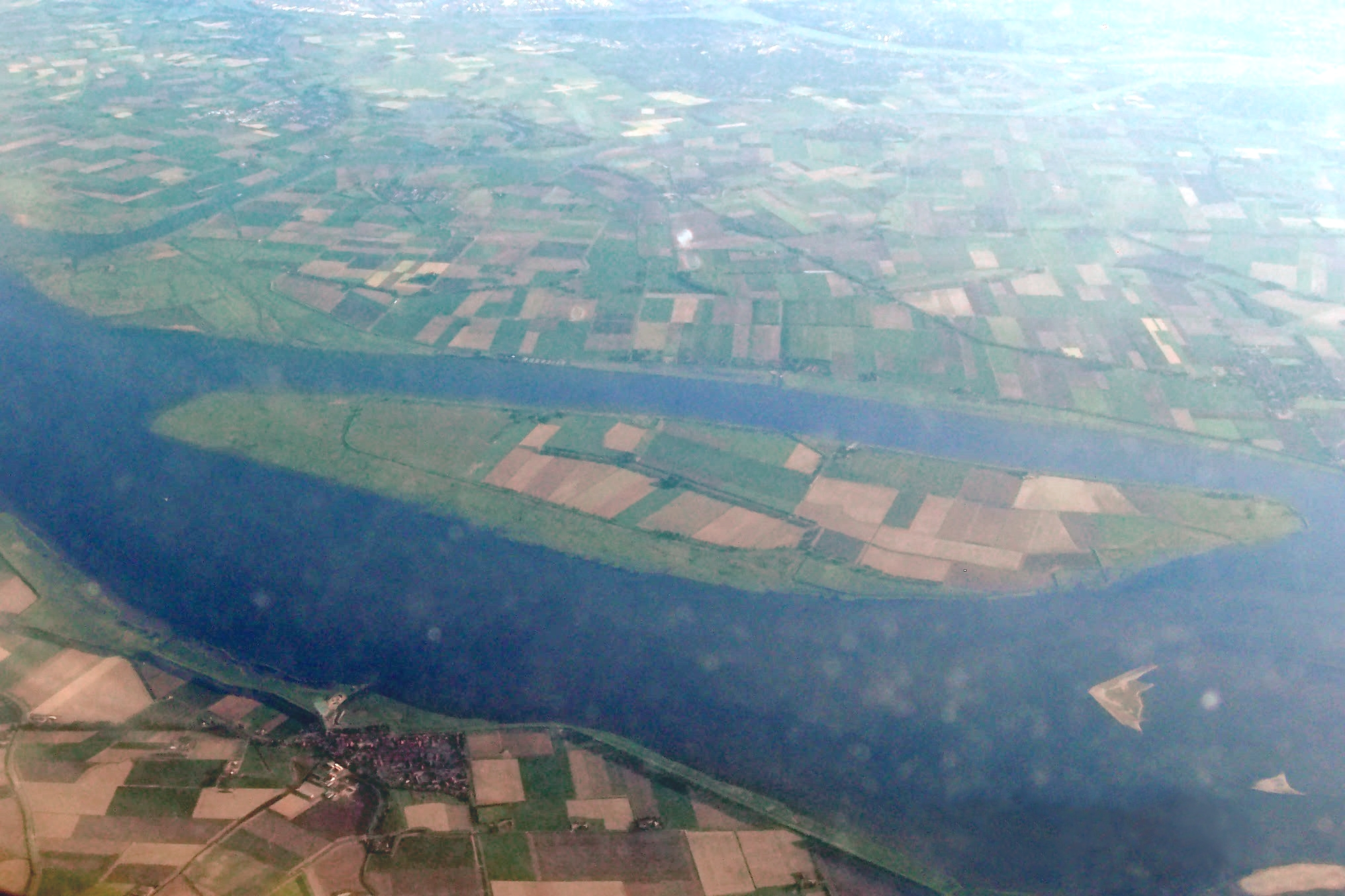
- View of Tiengemeten and the west of the Hoeksche Waard

- Flag Coat of arms

- Location in South Holland
- Coordinates: 51°46′N 4°28′E
- Country: Netherlands
- Province: South Holland

Government
  - Body: Municipal council
  - Mayor: Marian Witte (ind.)

Area
  - Total: 323.74 km^{2} (125.00 sq mi)

Population (July 2019)
  - Total: 87,199
  - Density: 269.35/km^{2} (697.61/sq mi)
- Time zone: UTC+1 (CET)
  - Summer (DST): UTC+2 (CEST)
- Website: www.gemeentehw.nl

Hoeksche Waard (Dutch pronunciation: [ˌɦuksə ˈʋaːrt]) is a municipality in the western Netherlands, in the province of South Holland, consisting of the eponymous Hoeksche Waard and Tiengemeten islands.

The municipality was formed on 1 January 2019 by the merger of the municipalities Binnenmaas, Cromstrijen, Korendijk, Oud-Beijerland, and Strijen.

== Gallery ==
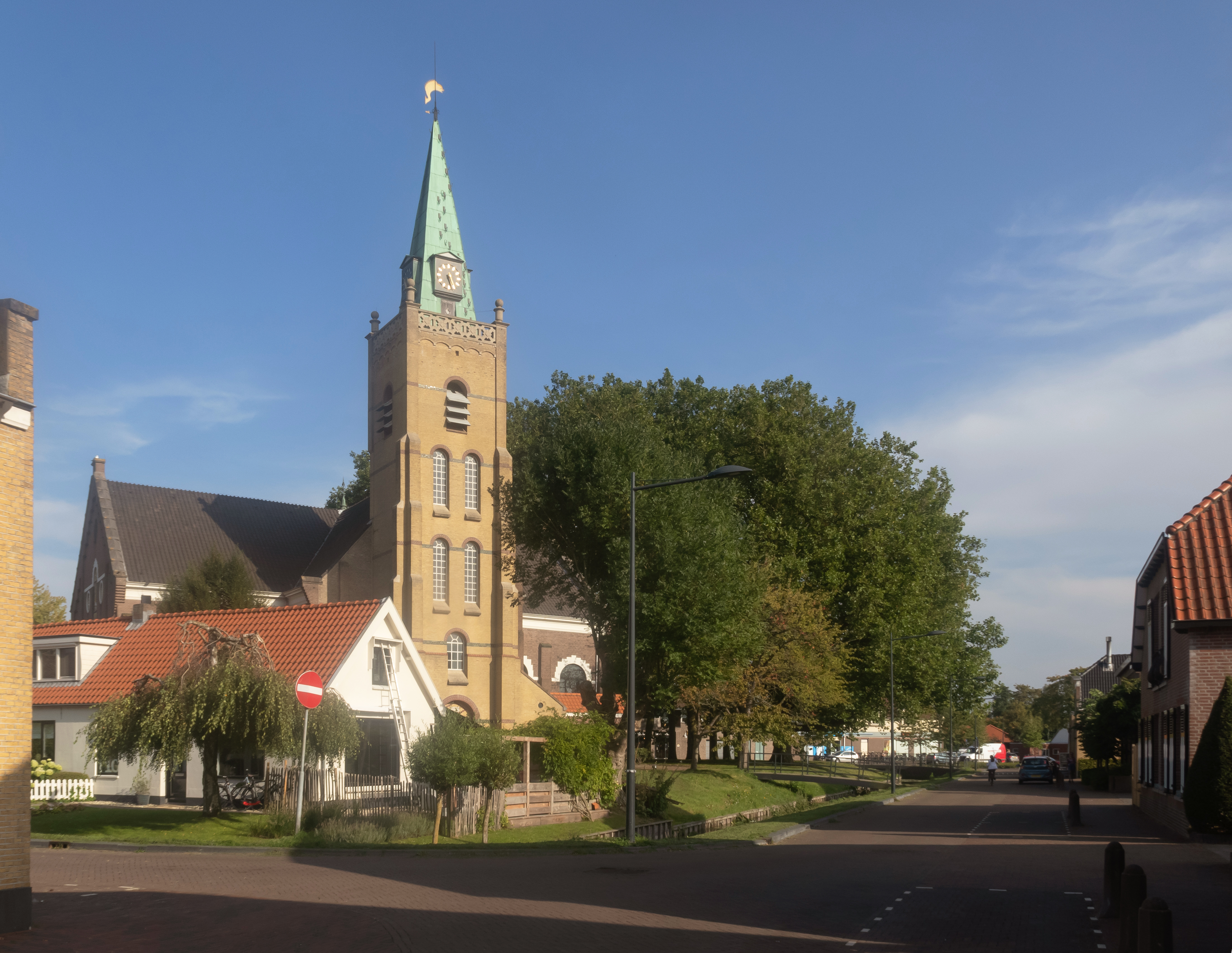
's-Gravendeel, church: the Kerk op de Heul

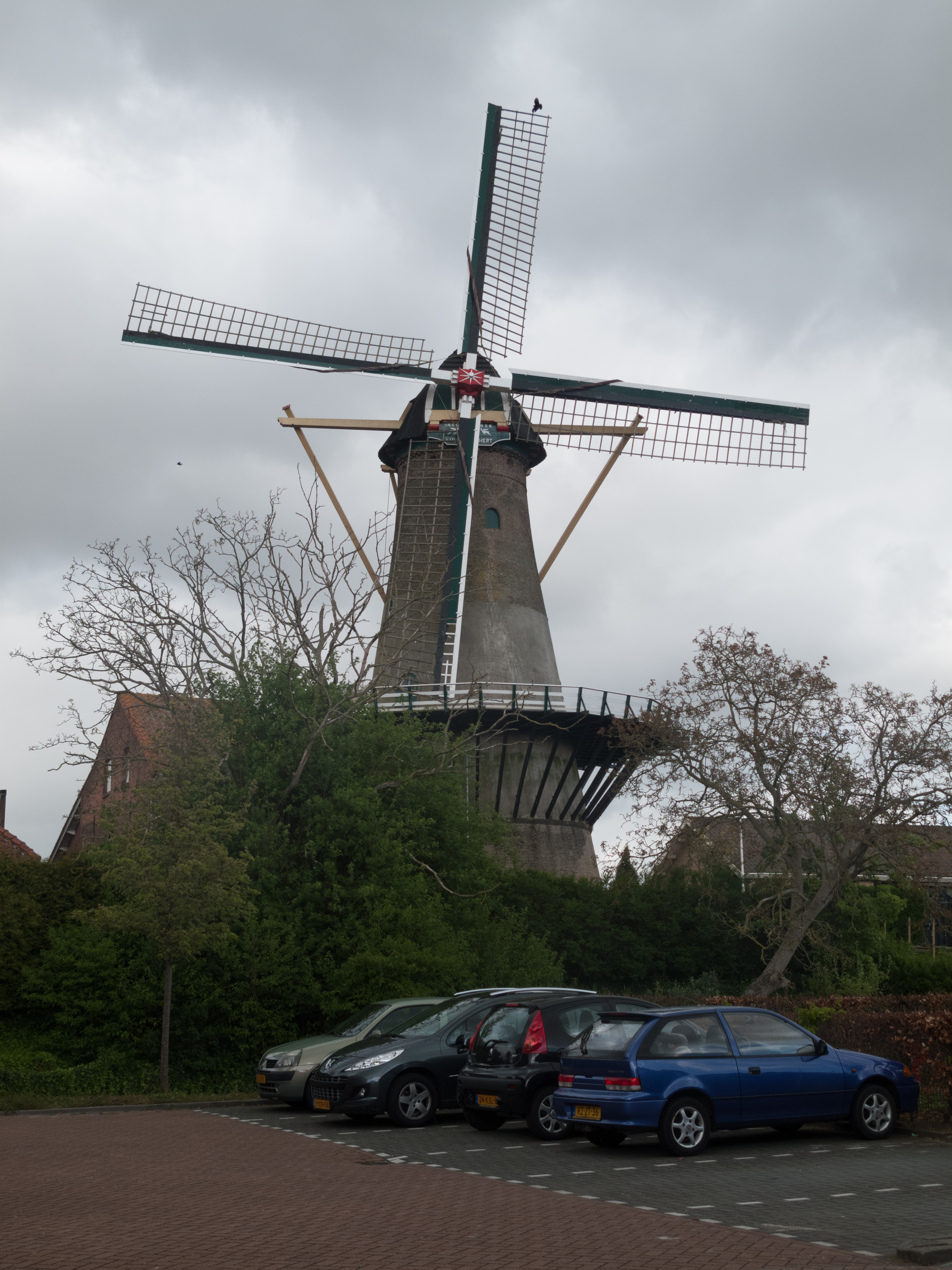
's-Gravendeel, windmill: korenmolen het Vliegend Hert

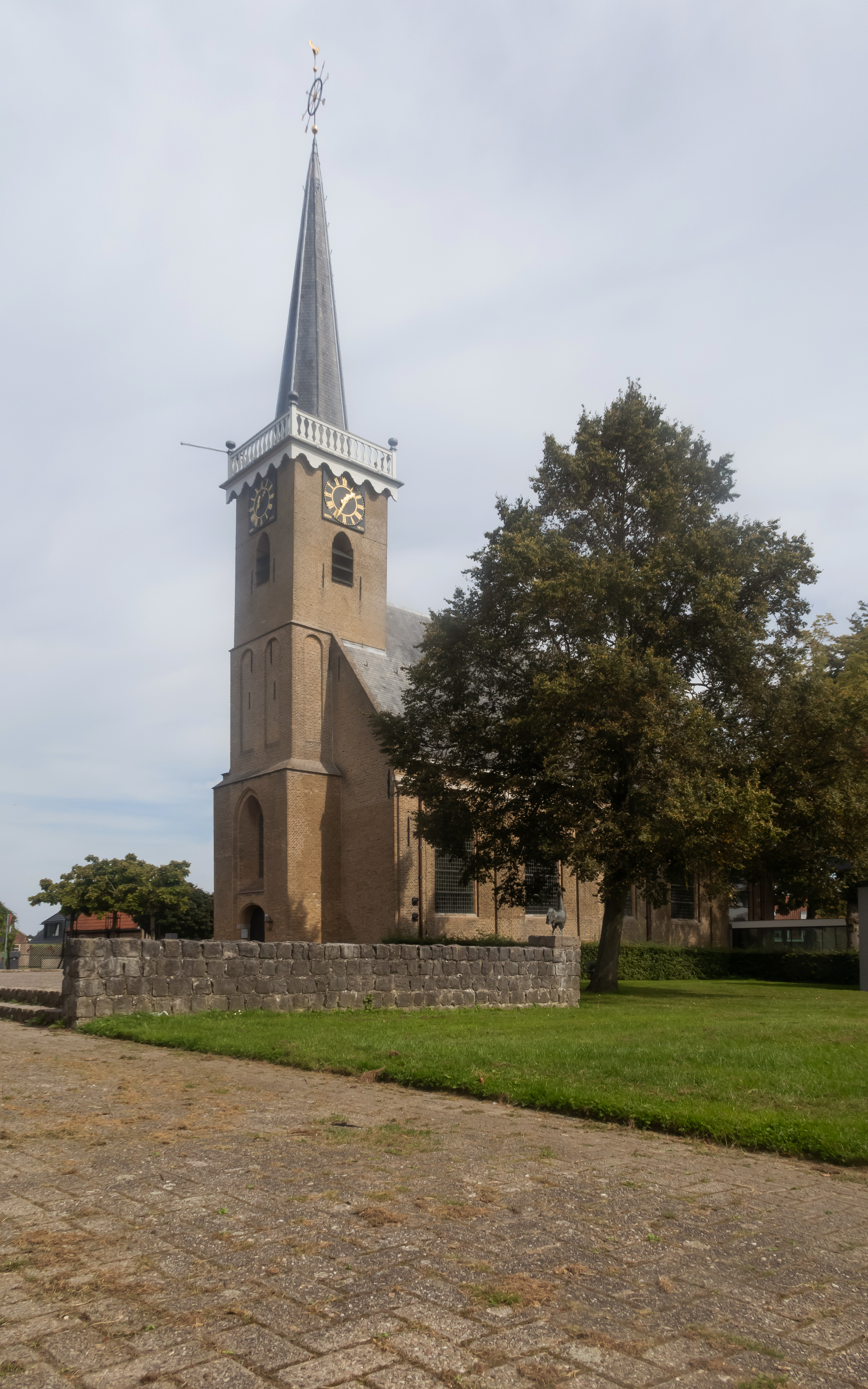
Westmaas, reformed church

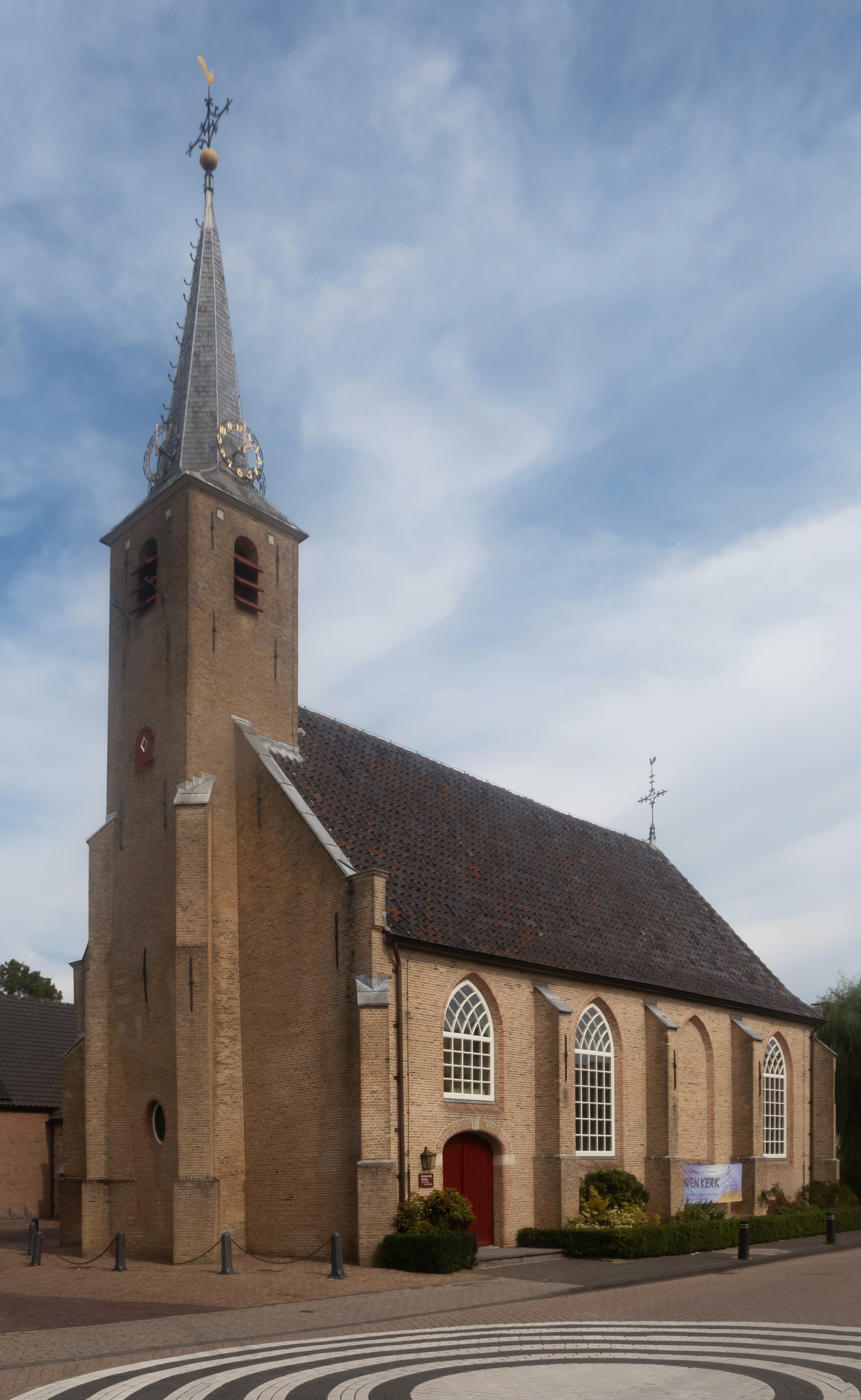
Klaaswaal, reformed church

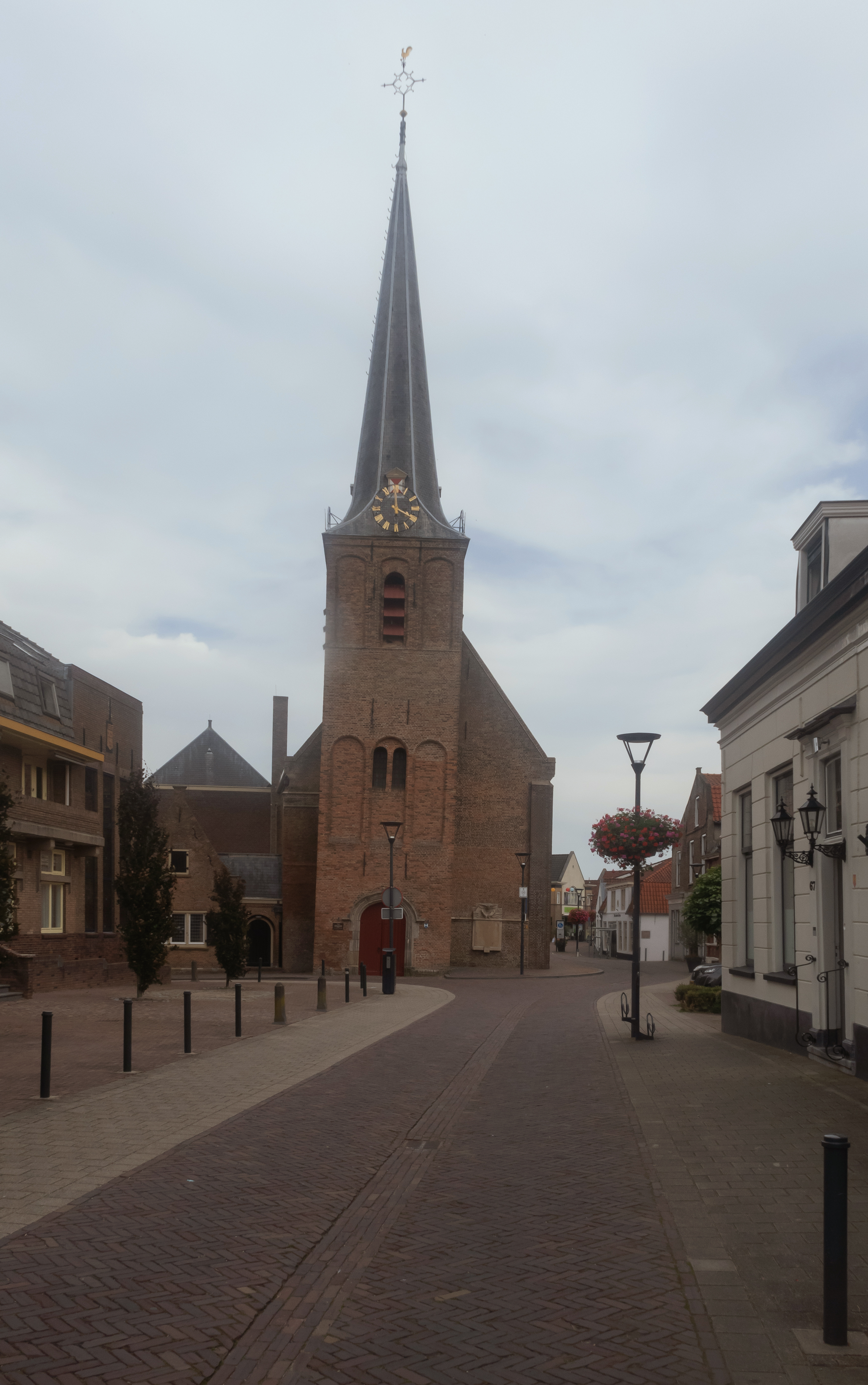
Strijen, church: the Grote- or Sint Lambertuskerk

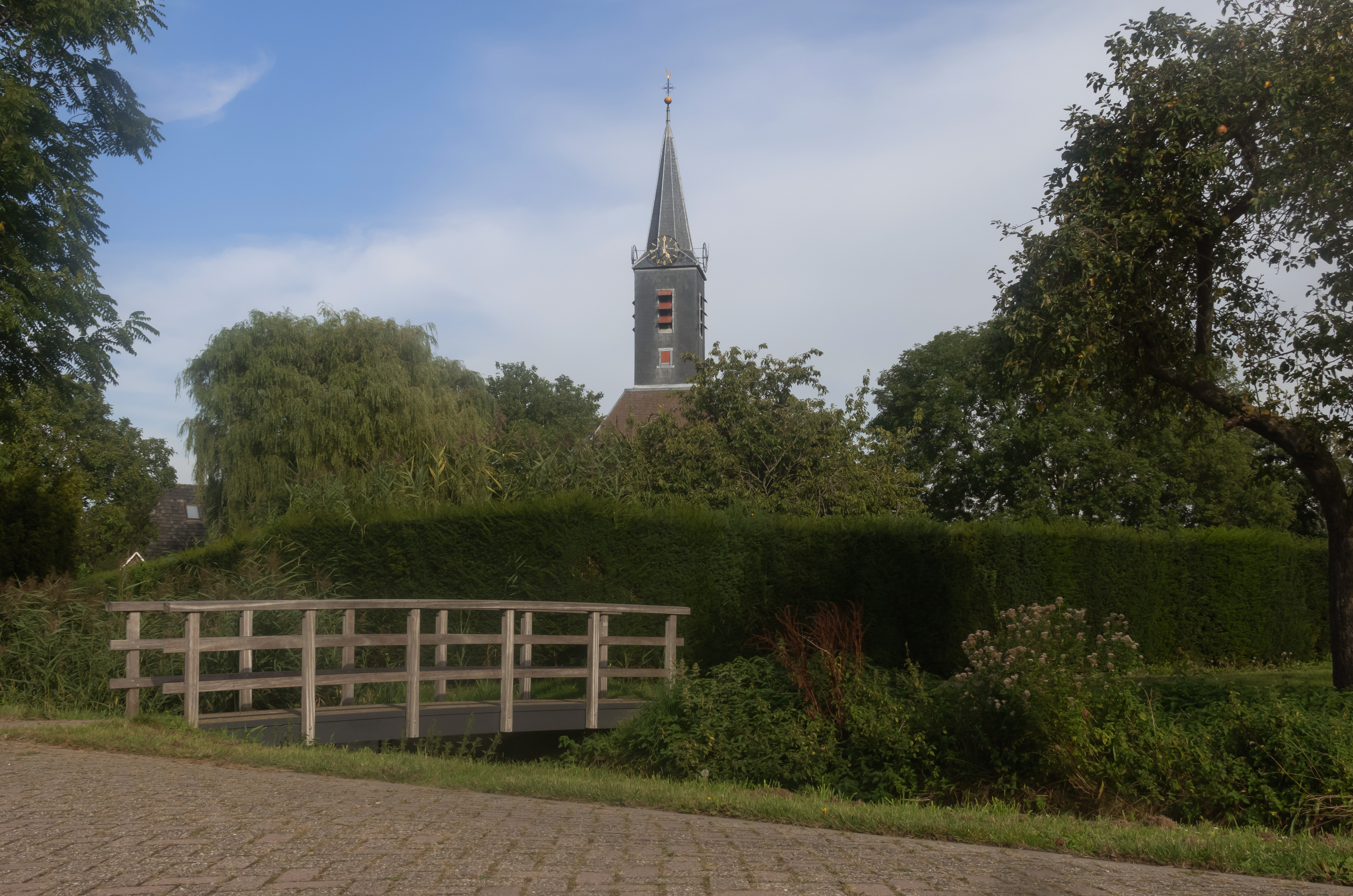
Maasdam, the Church

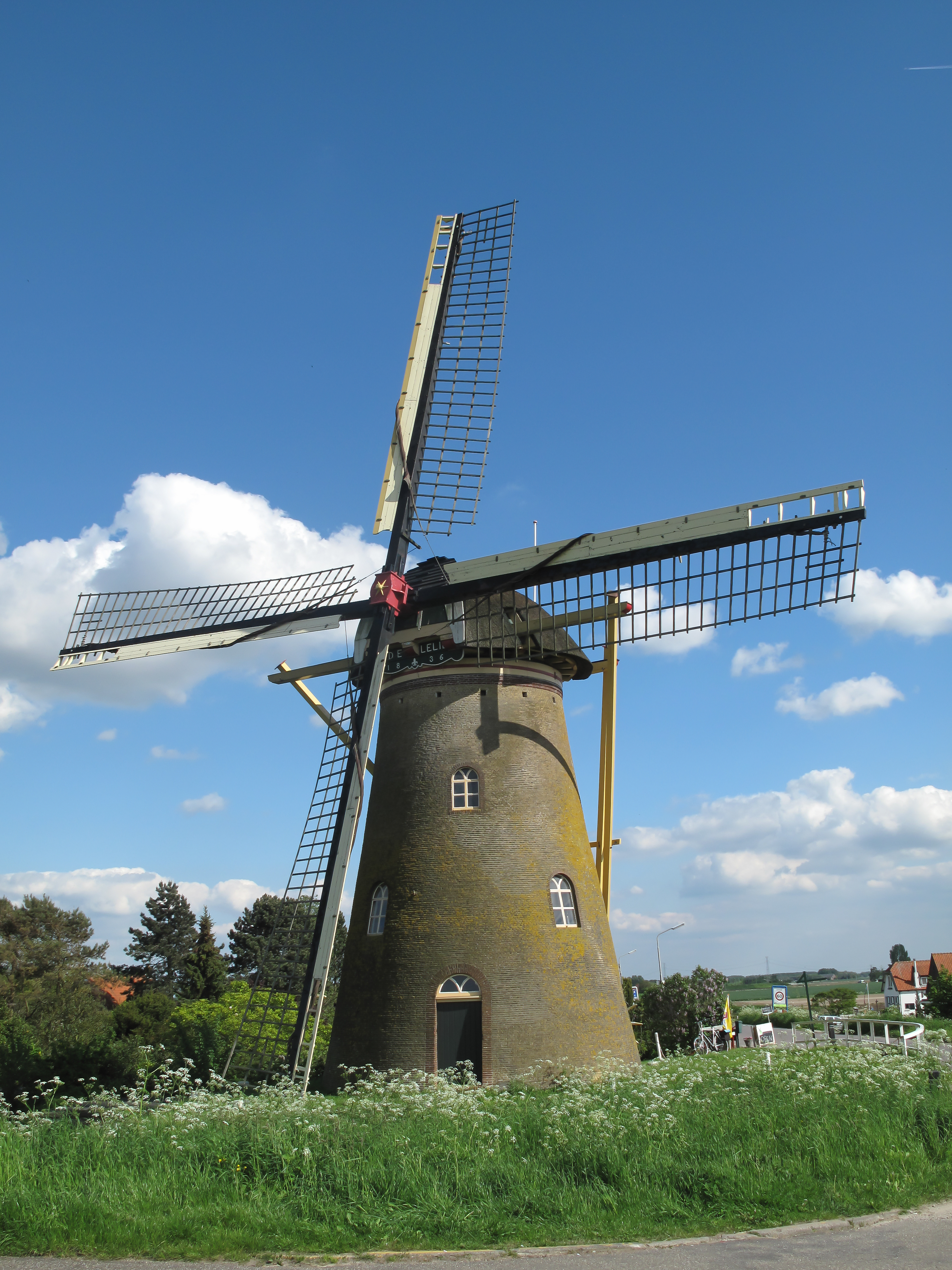
Puttershoek, windmill: korenmolen de Lelie

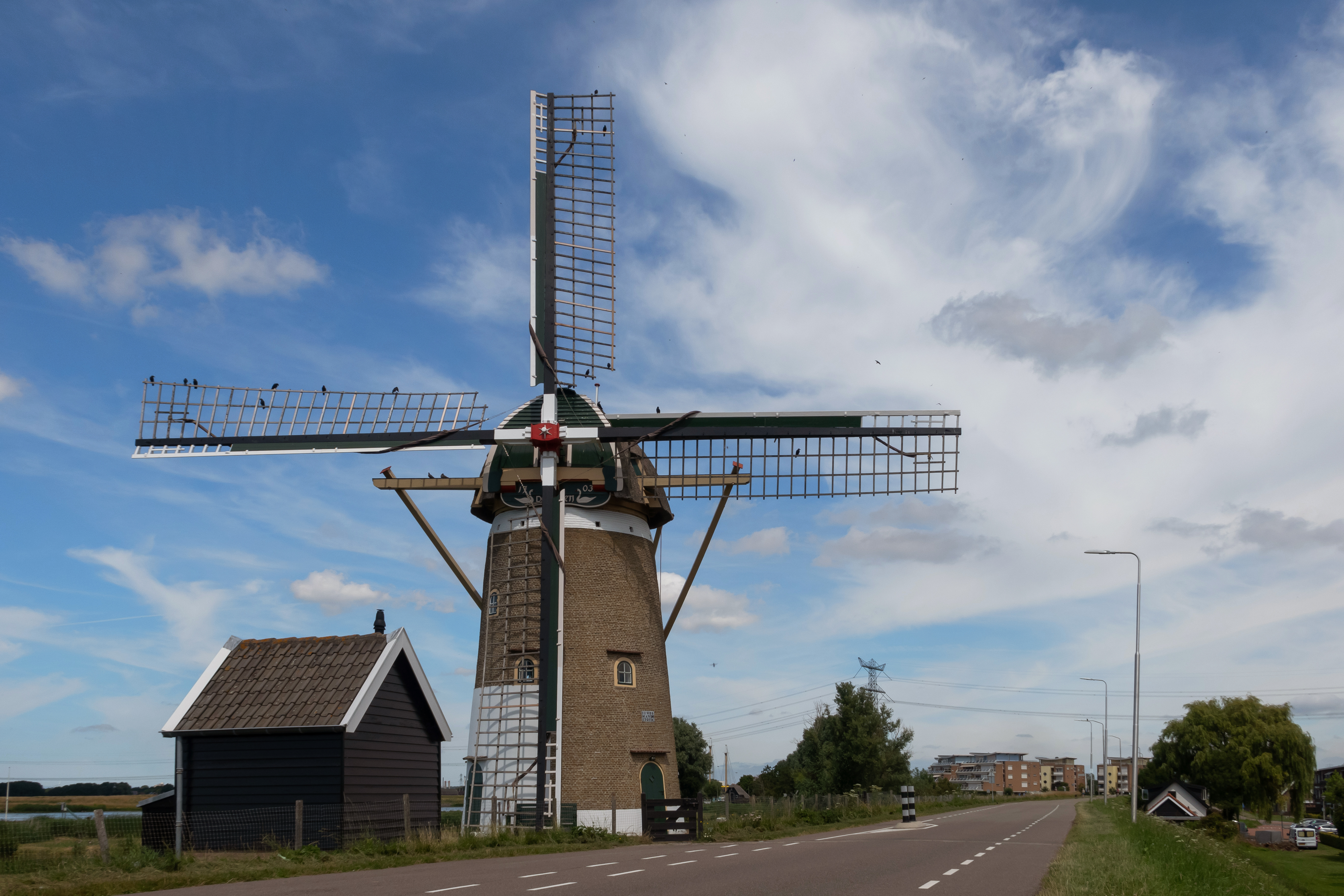
Nieuw-Beijerland, windmill: windmolen de Swaan

== Notable people ==
- Lamoral, Count of Egmont (1522–1568) a general and statesman, Lord of Oud-Beijerland.
- Philip, Count of Egmont (1558 – 1590) the fifth Count of Egmont and Lord of Oud-Beijerland
- Thomas van der Wilt (1659 in Piershil – 1733) a Dutch painter
- Philip van Dijk (1683 in Oud-Beijerland – 1753) a Dutch painter
- Stoffel Muller (1776 in Puttershoek – 1833) leader of a small Dutch Protestant sect Zwijndrechtse nieuwlichters
- Suze Groeneweg (born 1875 in Strijensas - 1940) a Dutch politician, the first woman to be elected to the Dutch parliament
- Renée Jones-Bos (born 1952 in Oud-Beijerland) a Dutch senior civil servant and diplomat
- Ineke Dezentjé Hamming-Bluemink (born 1954) a former Dutch politician and municipal councillor in Cromstrijen
- Anton Corbijn (born 1955 in Strijen) a Dutch photographer, music video director and film director
- Eibert Tigchelaar (born 1959 in Sint Anthoniepolder) academic and expert on the Dead Sea Scrolls
- Carlo Resoort (born 1973 in Numansdorp) a Dutch DJ, remixer and producer; plays with the 4 Strings
- Benno de Goeij (born 1975 in Oud-Beijerland) a Dutch record producer, works with Armin van Buuren
- Vivienne van den Assem (born 1983) a Dutch actress and presenter, brought up in Oud-Beijerland

=== Sport ===
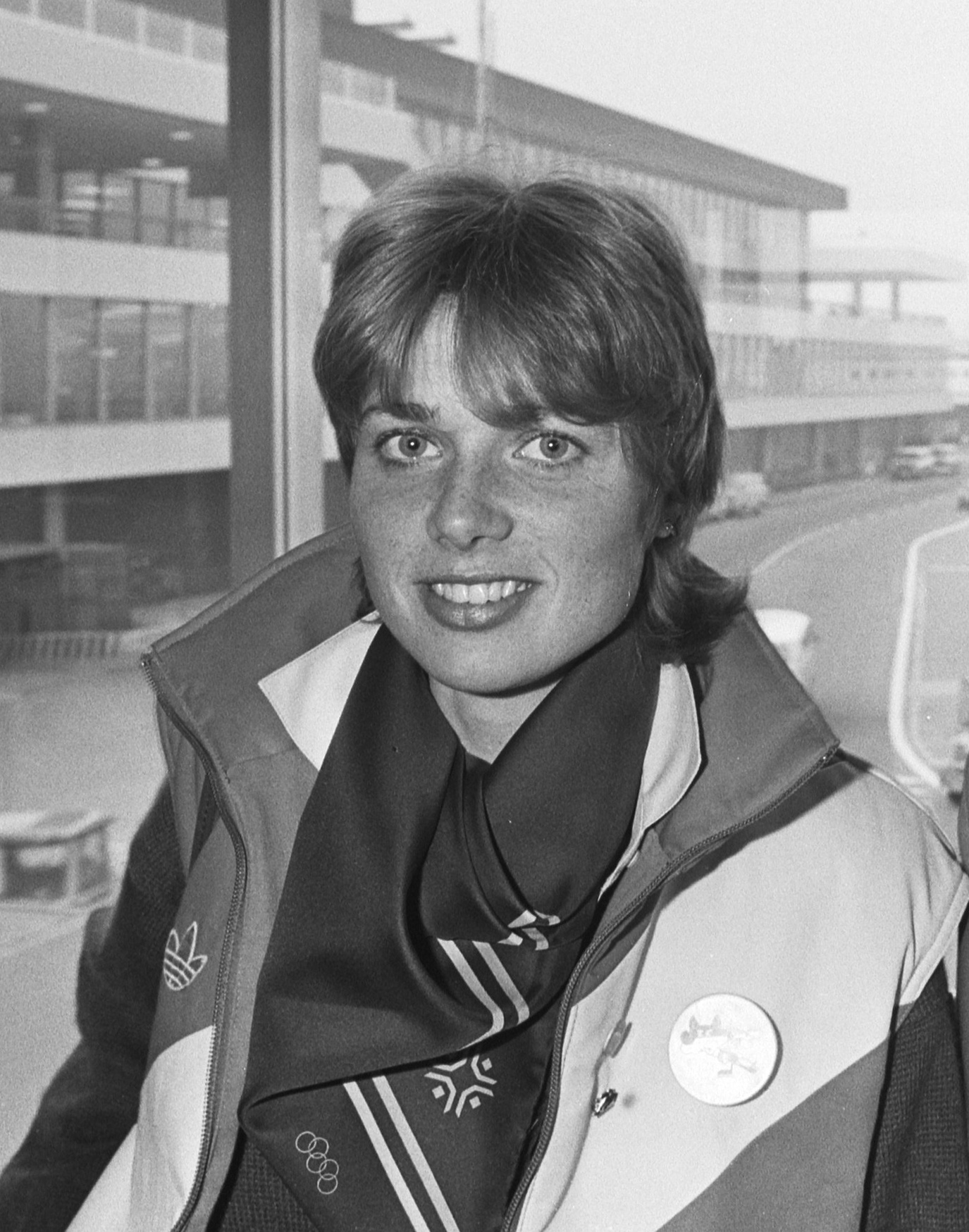
Ria Visser, 1984

- Nijs Korevaar (1927 in Mijnsheerenland – 2016) a Dutch water polo player, team bronze medallist at the 1948 Summer Olympics
- Kees Verkerk (born 1942 in Maasdam) a former speed skater, three time winter Olympic silver medallist and gold medallist at the 1968 Winter Olympics
- Adri van Tiggelen (born 1957 in Oud-Beijerland) a retired Dutch footballer with 505 club caps
- Ria Visser (born 1961 in Oud-Beijerland) a former ice speed skater and silver medallist at the 1980 Winter Olympics
- Kristie Boogert (born 1973 in Oud-Beijerland) a former professional female tennis player and team silver medallist at the 2000 Summer Olympics
- Olav Kooij (born 2001 in Numansdorp) is a professional racing cyclist and three time stage winner in the Giro d'Italia
