= List of rivers of the Netherlands =

These are the main rivers of the Netherlands.

All of the Netherlands is drained into the North Sea, partly via the IJsselmeer lake. In the list below, rivers that flow into the sea are sorted following the North Sea coast (including IJsselmeer) from the Belgian border near Knokke to the German border near Emden. Rivers that flow into other rivers are sorted by the proximity of their points of confluence to the sea.

At the end of this article the rivers of the Netherlands are given alphabetically. See also Category:Rivers of the Netherlands and Category:Rhine-Meuse-Scheldt delta.

Note for additions: please remember to add the city where the river meets for each river.

- Western Scheldt/Westerschelde (at Vlissingen)
  - Scheldt/Schelde (near Zandvliet, Belgium)
- Oosterschelde (at Westenschouwen)
  - Keeten-Mastgat (at Stavenisse)
    - branch of Krammer (at Bruinisse)
- Grevelingen (at Scharendijke)
  - Krammer (at Bruinisse)
    - Volkerak (at Oude Tonge)
      - Steenbergse Vliet (near Steenbergen)
      - Dintel (at Dintelsas)
        - Mark (in Zevenbergen)
          - Aa of Weerijs (in Breda)
      - branch of Hollands Diep (at Willemstad)
- Haringvliet (at Stellendam)
  - Spui (near Middelharnis)
    - branch of Oude Maas (at Oud-Beijerland)
  - Hollands Diep (at Willemstad)
    - Dordtsche Kil (at Moerdijk)
      - branch of Oude Maas (at Dordrecht)
    - Nieuwe Merwede (near Lage Zwaluwe)
      - branch of Boven Merwede (in Werkendam)
    - Amer (near Lage Zwaluwe)
      - Bergse Maas (near Geertruidenberg)
        - Meuse/Maas (in Heusden)
          - Dieze (near 's-Hertogenbosch)
            - Aa (in 's-Hertogenbosch)
            - Binnendieze (in 's-Hertogenbosch)
            - Dommel (in 's-Hertogenbosch)
              - Gender (in Eindhoven)
          - Niers (in Gennep)
          - Swalm (in Swalmen)
          - Roer (in Roermond)
            - Wurm (near Heinsberg, Germany)
          - Geleenbeek (near Maasbracht)
          - Geul (near Meerssen)
          - Jeker/Geer (in Maastricht)
          - Voer/Fouron (in Eijsden)
- Nieuwe Waterweg (at Hook of Holland)
  - Het Scheur (near Maassluis)
    - Nieuwe Maas (near Vlaardingen)
      - Schie (in Schiedam)
        - Vliet (in Delft)
      - Rotte (in Rotterdam)
      - Hollandse IJssel (in Krimpen aan den IJssel)
        - Gouwe (in Gouda)
          - branch of Oude Rijn (in Alphen aan den Rijn)
      - Lek (in Krimpen aan de Lek)
        - Nederrijn (in Wijk bij Duurstede)
          - Pannerdens Kanaal (near Arnhem)
            - branch of Bijlands Kanaal (at Millingen aan de Rijn)
      - Noord (in Krimpen aan de Lek)
        - branch of Oude Maas (in Dordrecht)
    - Oude Maas (near Vlaardingen)
      - Beneden Merwede (in Dordrecht)
        - Boven Merwede (in Werkendam)
          - Linge (in Gorinchem)
          - Afgedamde Maas (in Woudrichem)
            - branch of Meuse (in Heusden)
          - Waal (in Woudrichem)
            - Bijlands Kanaal (at Millingen aan de Rijn)
              - Rhine/Rijn (in Tolkamer)
- Oude Rijn (into the North Sea at Katwijk)
  - Leidse Rijn (in Harmelen)
    - Kromme Rijn (in Utrecht)
      - branch of Nederrijn (in Wijk bij Duurstede)
- Amstel (into the IJ bay of the IJsselmeer to the IJ bay of the IJsselmeer in Amsterdam)
  - Zaan (in Zaanstad)
  - Spaarne (near Spaarndam)
- Vecht (into the IJsselmeer in Muiden)
  - branch of Kromme Rijn (in Utrecht)
- IJssel (into the IJsselmeer near Kampen)
  - Schipbeek (near Deventer)
  - Berkel (in Zutphen)
  - Oude IJssel (in Doesburg)
  - branch of Pannerdens Kanaal (near Arnhem)
- Zwarte Water (into the IJsselmeer near Genemuiden)
  - Vecht (Overijssel) (near Zwolle)
    - Regge (near Ommen)
    - Dinkel (in Neuenhaus, Germany)
- Lauwers (in Lauwersoog)
- Ems (near Delfzijl)

== Alphabetical list ==
Aa, Afgedamde Maas, Amer, Amstel, Beneden Merwede, Bergse Maas, Berkel, Bijlands Kanaal, Boven Merwede, Dieze, Dinkel, Dintel, Dommel, Dordtsche Kil, Ems, Geleenbeek, Gender, Geul, Gouwe, Grevelingen, Haringvliet, Hollands Diep, Hollandse IJssel, IJssel, Jeker, Keeten-Mastgat, Krammer, Kromme Rijn, Lauwers, Lek, Linge, Mark, Meuse, Nederrijn, Niers, Nieuwe Maas, Nieuwe Merwede, Nieuwe Waterweg, Noord, Oosterschelde, Oude IJssel, Oude Maas, Oude Rijn, Pannerdens Kanaal, Regge, Rhine, Rotte, Roer, Scheldt, Scheur, Schie, Schipbeek, Spaarne, Spui, Steenbergse Vliet, Swalm, Vecht (Overijssel), Vecht (Utrecht), Vliet, Voer, Volkerak, Waal, Western Scheldt, Wurm, Zaan, Zwarte Water
