= Rhine–Meuse–Scheldt Delta =

Delta formed by three rivers in the Netherlands

Coordinates: 51°43′50″N 4°42′57″E

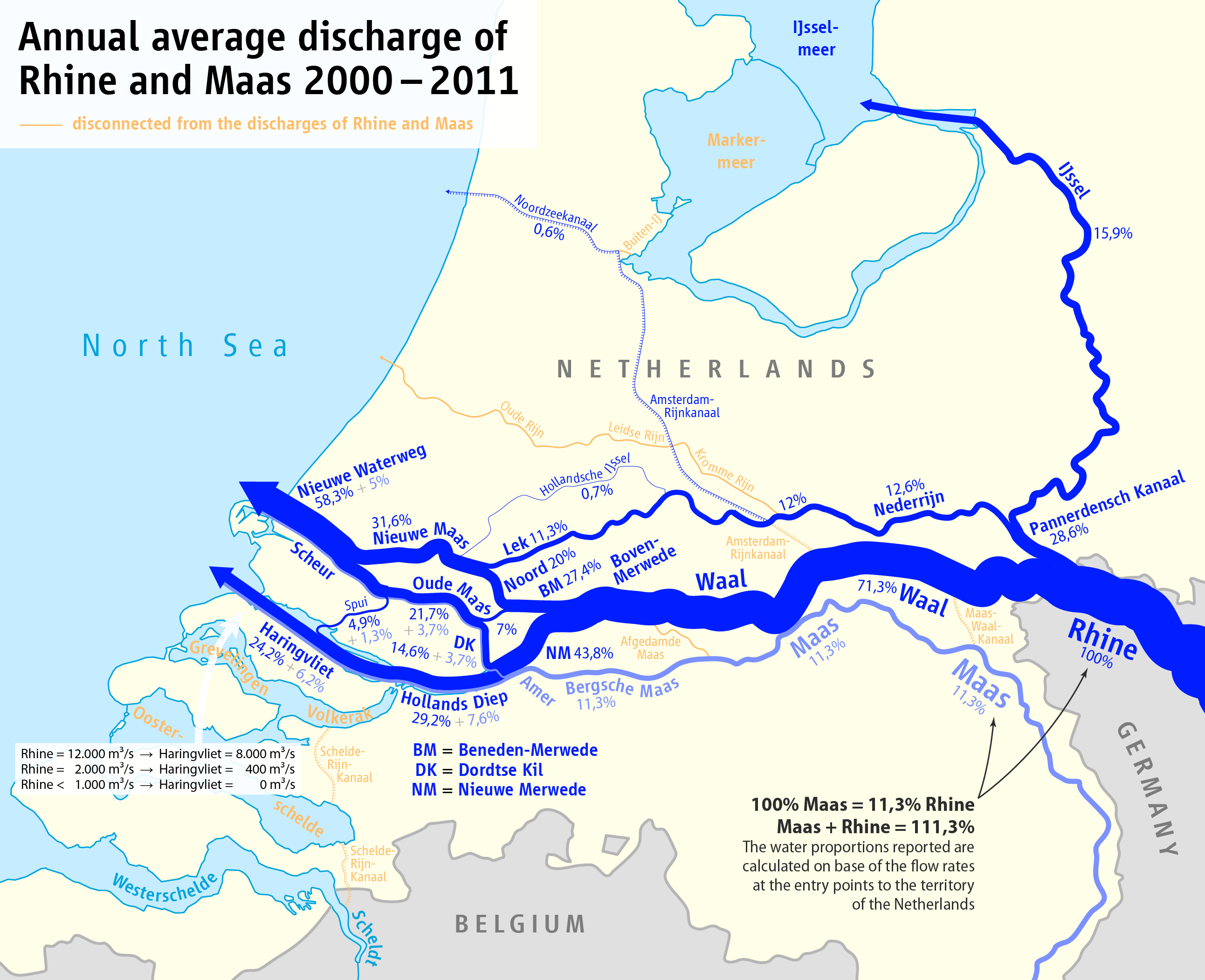
Partition of Rhine and Meuse water among the various branches of their delta (Scheldt in lower left; Meuse labelled "Maas")

The Rhine–Meuse–Scheldt Delta is a river delta in the Netherlands formed by the confluence of the Rhine, the Meuse and the Scheldt rivers. In some cases, the Scheldt Delta is considered a separate delta to the Rhine–Meuse Delta. The result is a multitude of islands, branches and branch names, in which a waterway that appears to be one continuous stream may have numerous separate names for different sections, e.g. Rhine → Bijlands Kanaal → Pannerdens Kanaal → Nederrijn → Lek → Nieuwe Maas → Het Scheur → Nieuwe Waterweg. Since the Rhine contributes most of the water, the term "Rhine Delta" is commonly used, although this name is also used for the delta where the Alpine Rhine flows into Lake Constance. By some calculations, the Rhine–Meuse–Scheldt Delta covers 25,347 km^{2} (9,787 mi^{2}), making it the largest in Europe.

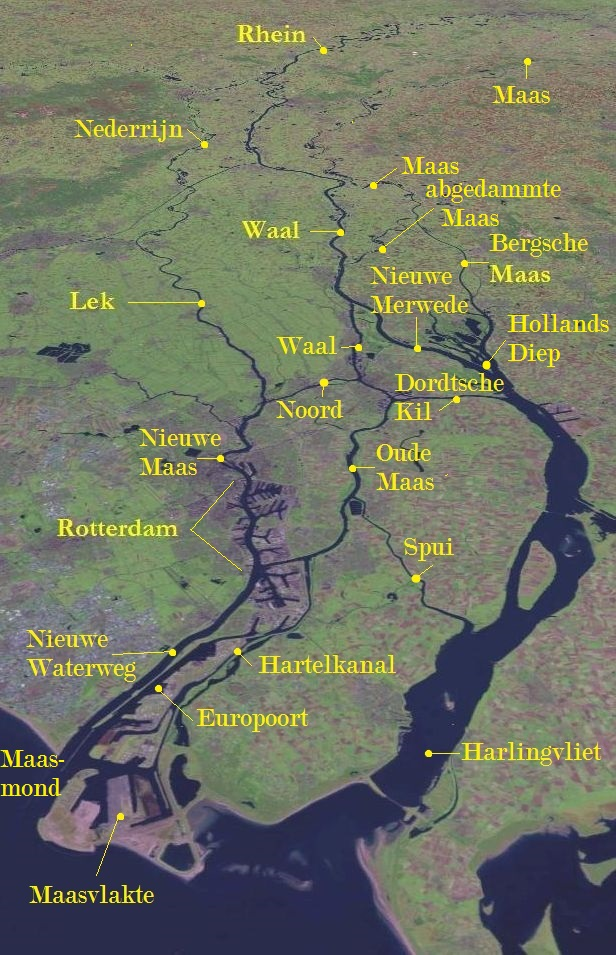
The central part of the Rhine-Meuse Delta (Scheldt not visible)

The Rhine–Meuse–Scheldt Delta is economically extremely important, since the three rivers are major navigable waterways. The delta is the entrance from the North Sea to the German and Central European hinterland (and to a lesser extent France). Major ports in the delta are Rotterdam, Antwerp (Belgium), Vlissingen, Amsterdam (through the Amsterdam–Rhine Canal), and Ghent (through the Ghent–Terneuzen Canal). The land areas in the delta are protected from flooding by the Dutch Delta Works.

== Geography ==
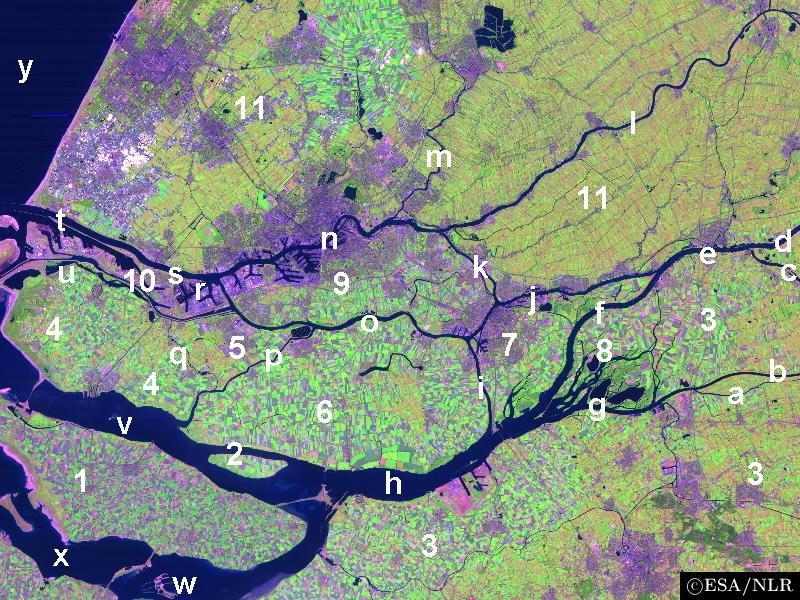
Satellite image of the western part of the Rhine–Meuse–Scheldt Delta: 1. Part of the island of Goeree-Overflakkee 2. The island of Tiengemeten 3. The west end of the province of North Brabant 4. The island Voorne 5. The island of Putten 6. The island of Hoeksche Waard 7. The island of Dordrecht 8. The national park of De Biesbosch 9. The island of IJsselmonde 10. The island of Rozenburg 11. Part of the province of South Holland a. The Oude Maasje stream b. The Bergse Maas ship canal c. The Afgedamde Maas section of the Meuse d. River Waal e. River Boven Merwede f. The Nieuwe Merwede ship canal g. The Amer estuary h. The Hollands Diep strait i. River Dordtsche Kil j. River Beneden Merwede k. River Noord l. River Lek m. River Hollandse IJssel n. River Nieuwe Maas o. River Oude Maas p. River Spui q. River Bernisse r. The former strait of Botlek, now part of the Rotterdam sea port s. River Het Scheur t. The Nieuwe Waterweg ship canal u. The Brielse Meer (Lake Brielle, a former Rhine branch called Nieuwe Maas-Brielse Maas) v. The Haringvliet strait w. The Krammer strait x. Lake Grevelingen y. The North Sea.

The shape of the Rhine Delta is determined by two bifurcations: firstly, at Millingen aan de Rijn, the Rhine splits into the Waal and the Nederrijn, and secondly near Arnhem, the IJssel branches off from the Nederrijn. This creates three main flows, two of which change names rather often. The largest and southern main branch begins as the Waal and continues as the Boven Merwede ("Upper Merwede"), the Beneden Merwede ("Lower Merwede"), the Noord River ("North River"), the Nieuwe Maas ("New Meuse"), Het Scheur ("the Rip") and the Nieuwe Waterweg ("New Waterway"). The middle flow begins as the Nederrijn, then changes into the Lek, then joins the Noord, thereby forming the Nieuwe Maas. The northern flow keeps the name IJssel until it flows into Lake IJsselmeer. Three more flows carry significant amounts of water: the Nieuwe Merwede ("New Merwede"), which branches off from the southern branch where it changes from the Boven to the Beneden Merwede; the Oude Maas ("Old Meuse"), which branches off from the southern branch where it changes from the Benede Merwede into the Noord, and the Dordtsche Kil, which branches off from the Oude Maas.

Changing the Meuse estuary in 1904: light blue old course, dark blue today's course

Before the St. Elizabeth's flood (1421) the Meuse flowed just south of today's line Merwede–Oude Maas to the North Sea and formed an archipelago-like estuary with the Waal and the Lek. This system of numerous bays, estuary-like extended rivers, many islands and constant changes of the coastline, is hard to imagine today. From 1421 to 1904, the Meuse and the Waal merged further upstream at Gorinchem to form the Merwede. For flood protection reasons, the Meuse was separated from the Waal through a lock and diverted into a new outlet called the "Bergse Maas", then the Amer flowing into the former bay known as the Hollands Diep.

The northwestern part of the estuary (around Hook of Holland), is still called Maasmond ("Meuse Mouth"), ignoring the fact that it now carries only water from the Rhine. This might explain the confusing naming of the various branches.

The hydrography of the current delta is characterized by the delta's main arms, disconnected arms (Hollandse IJssel, Linge, Vecht, etc.) and smaller rivers and streams. Many rivers have been closed ("dammed") and now serve as drainage channels for the numerous polders. The construction of Delta Works changed the delta in the second half of the 20th century fundamentally. Currently Rhine water runs into the sea, or into former marine bays now separated from the sea, in five places, namely at the mouths of the Nieuwe Merwede, Nieuwe Waterway (Nieuwe Maas), Dordtse Kil, Spui and IJssel.

The Rhine–Meuse Delta is a tidal delta, shaped not only by the sedimentation of the rivers, but also by tidal currents. This meant that high tide formed a serious risk because strong tidal currents could tear huge areas of land into the sea. Before the construction of the Delta Works, tidal influence was palpable up to Nijmegen, and even today, after the regulatory action of the Delta Works, the tide acts far inland. At the Waal, for example, the most landward tidal influence can be detected between Brakel and Zaltbommel.

== History ==
Already in the time of Julius Caesar, the "Island of the Batavi" was known to the Romans. Its eastern point was the split of the Rhine into the Oude Rijn and the Waal, which at this time were the two main branches of the Rhine. The Waal flowed into the Meuse in the Roman period.

Pliny the Elder's Natural History gives a list of tribes living in the "Gaulish islands", within the delta region between different mouths of the Rhine. First, he mentions the large island of the Batavians and the Cananefates. Then he gives the list of other peoples who he says are stretched out along 100 Roman miles, between the mouth of the Helinius (understood to be the main mouth of the Meuse, where the Waal (Latin: Vacalis) also discharged) and the Roman fortification at Flevum (a port north of the Old Rhine). The Roman castrum at Flevum was mentioned by Tacitus, and is equated today with Velsen. Although the details are no longer clear, there was apparently sometimes an extension of the Old IJ that came close to the North Sea here. But the term Flevo was also used by Pomponius Mela to refer to the fresh water lakes which were in the area of the modern Zuiderzee, which Mela specifically says that the Rhine fed into. So the Rhine mouth mentioned by Pliny might have been a discharge into a lake, or perhaps water running to Flevum on the coast may have run via the lakes to the coast, perhaps first through an ancient version of the Vecht, or the IJssel. The IJssel however was joined to the Rhine artificially, by Drusus, and is quite far from any of the places known to be called Flevus. Suetonius says that this channel was still referred to as Drusus' fossa in his time. Some authors have argued that the mouth Pliny mentions is the Vlie, much further to the north than Velsen where the main waters of the lake entered the North Sea.

== Emissaries ==
There are actually five emissaries, namely:

- Haringvlietdam (dam blocking the Haringvliet)
- Nieuwe Waterweg (canal connecting Rotterdam to the North Sea)
- North Sea Canal, connecting Amsterdam to IJmuiden
- Afsluitdijk, damming off the Zuiderzee, with discharging sluices at two places (Stevinsluizen at Den Oever and Lorentzsluizen at Kornwerderzand).
