= De Biesbosch National Park =

National park in the Netherlands

- Nationaal Park De Biesbosch
- IUCN category II (national park)
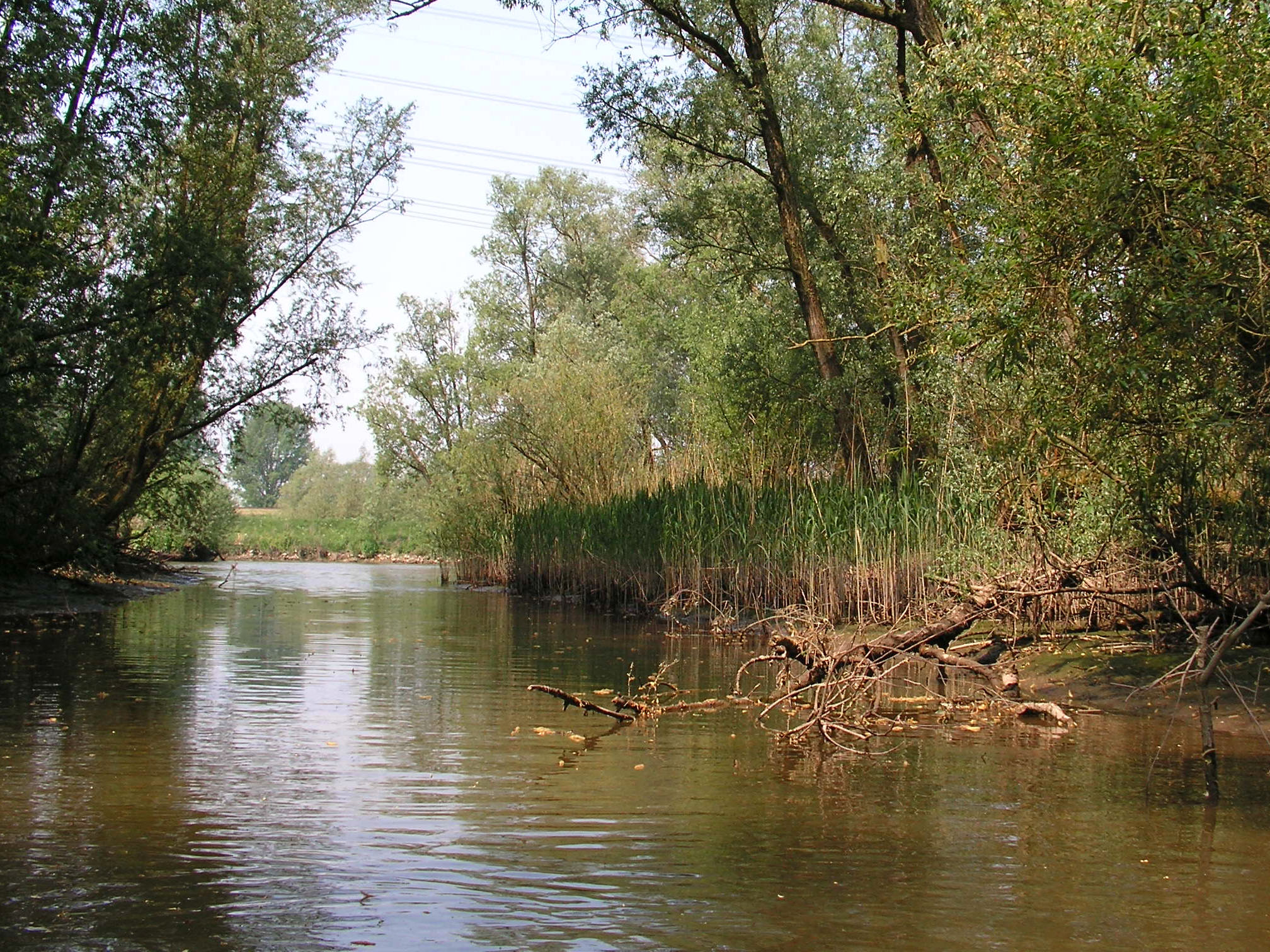
- Hollandse Biesbosch near Dordrecht, Netherlands

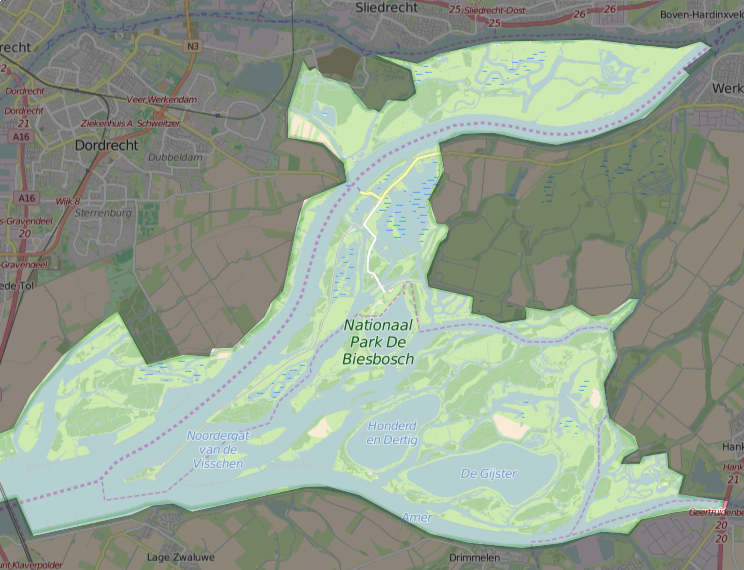
- Map of the National Park
- Location: Municipalities: Altena, Dordrecht, Drimmelen, Geertruidenberg; Provinces: North Brabant, South Holland; Country: Netherlands
- Nearest city: Dordrecht, Netherlands
- Coordinates: 51°44′N 4°45′E
- Area: 90 km^{2} (35 sq mi)
- Established: 1994
- Governing body: Staatsbosbeheer
- Website: www.biesbosch.org

Ramsar Wetland
- Official name: Biesbosch
- Designated: 23 May 1980
- Reference no.: 197

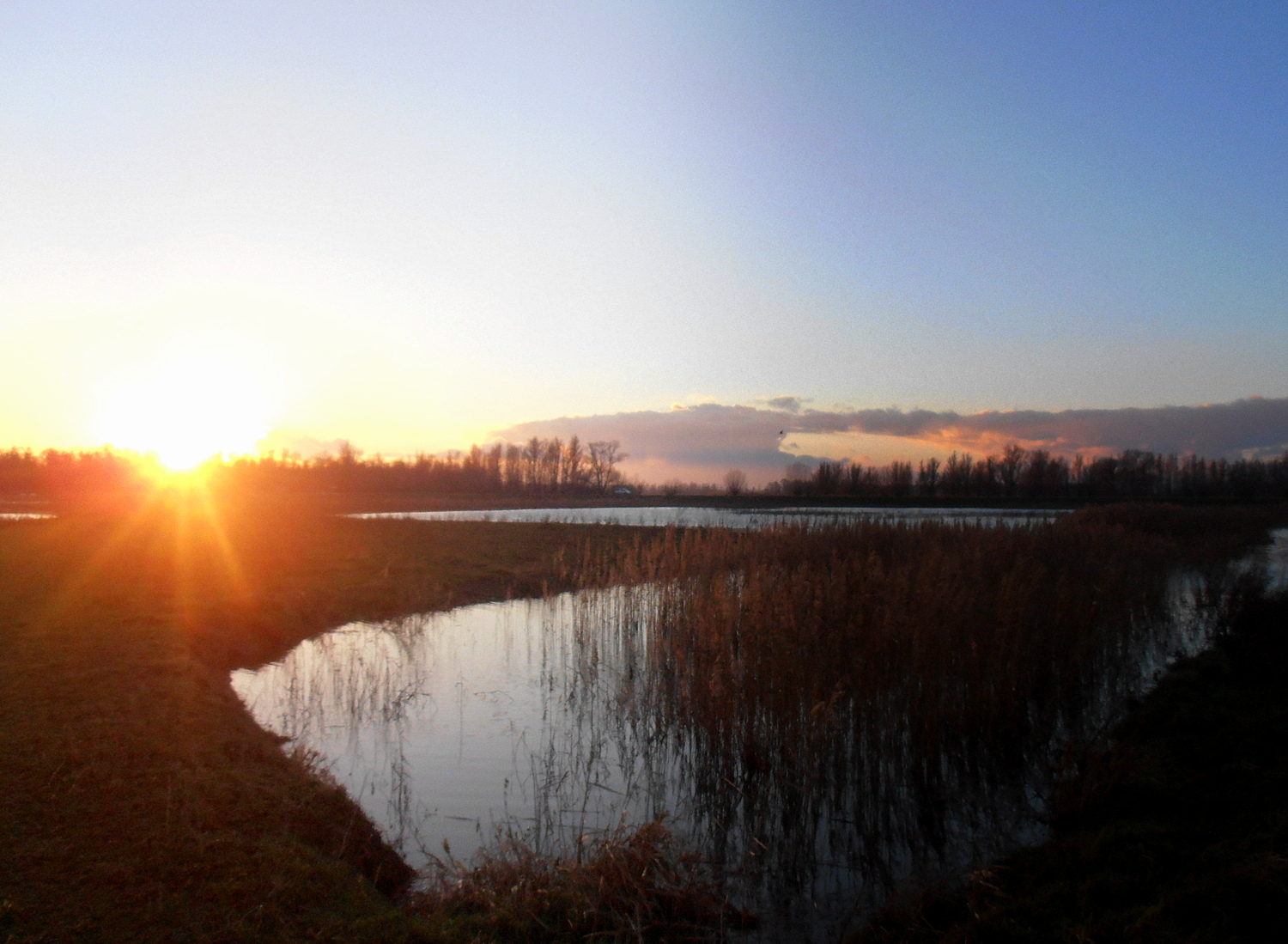
Sunset over the Biesbosch

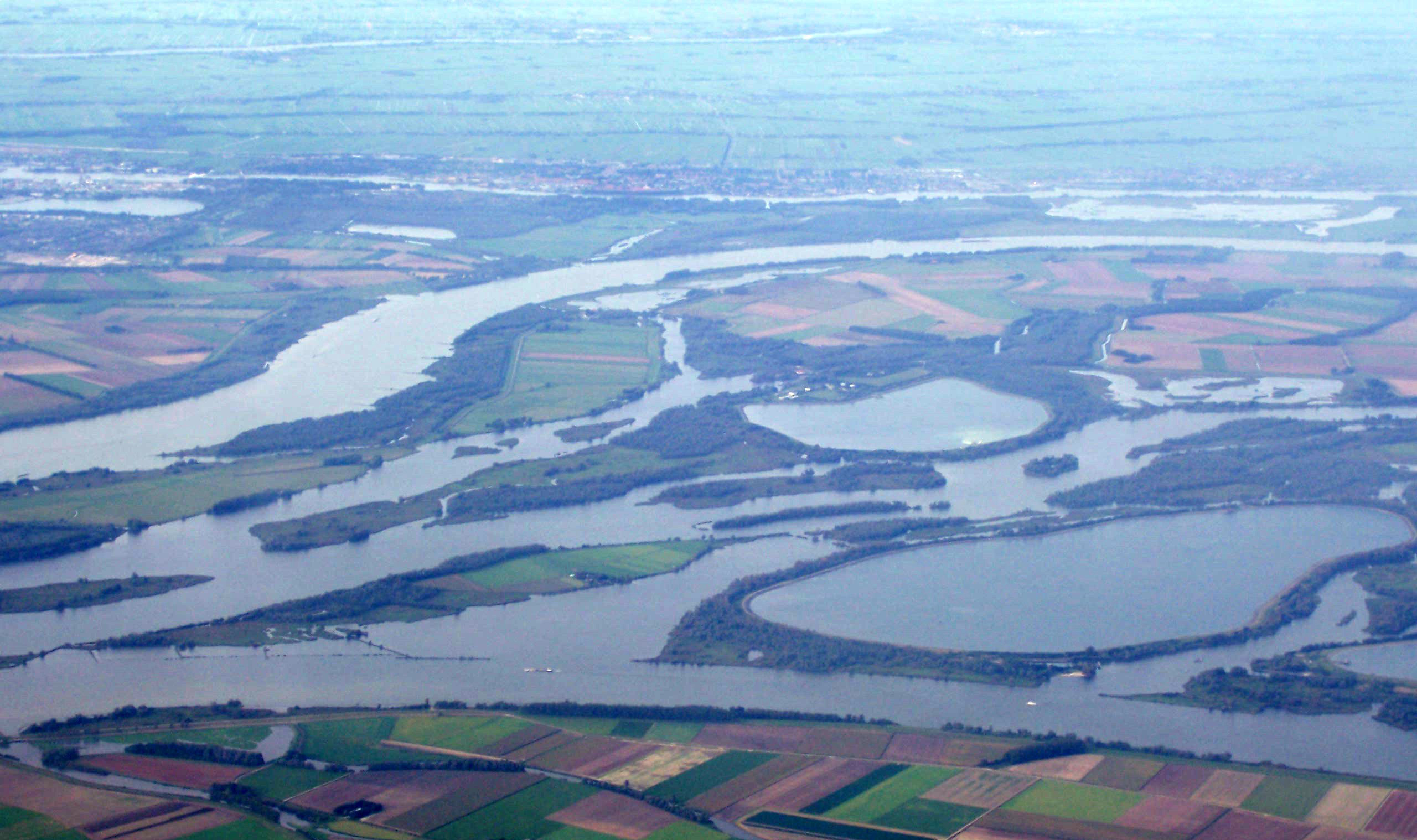
Air view over the Biesbosch.

De Biesbosch National Park is one of the largest national parks in the Netherlands and one of the last extensive areas of freshwater tidal wetlands in Northwestern Europe. The Biesbosch ('forest of sedges' or 'rushwoods') consists of a large network of rivers and smaller and larger creeks with islands. The vegetation is mostly willow forests, although wet grasslands and fields of reed are common as well. The Biesbosch is an important wetland area for waterfowl and has a rich flora and fauna. It is especially important for migrating geese.

== Structure ==
=== National Park ===
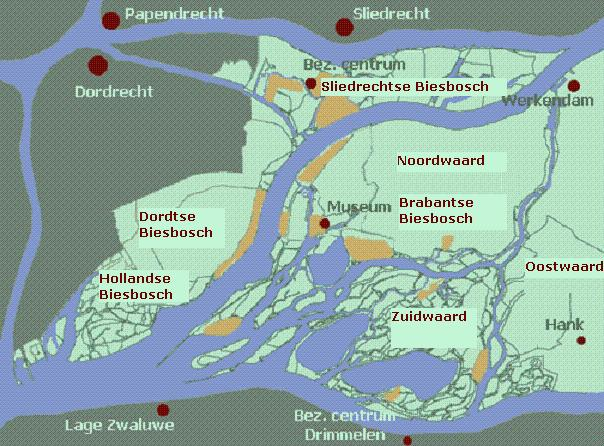
Simple map of the Biesbosch.

The Biesbosch National Park consists of the following major parts:

- Sliedrechtse Biesbosch

The most northern part of the Biesbosch. This is the part of the Biesbosch with the most significant tidal influence (one of the distinctive characteristics of the Biesbosch). The Sliedrechtse Biesbosch is named after the town of Sliedrecht, which was drowned during the creation of the Biesbosch and was later rebuilt on the other side of the river Beneden Merwede (one of the borders of the Biesbosch). The eastern part of the Sliedrechtse Biesbosch is one of the few areas in the Netherlands that has an intact system of river dunes.

- Hollandse Biesbosch

The westernmost part of the Biesbosch and the largest remnant of the (once much larger) South Hollandic part of the Biesbosch. The Hollandse Biesbosch is the part of the National Park best known for its birds.

- Brabantse Biesbosch (Zuidwaard)

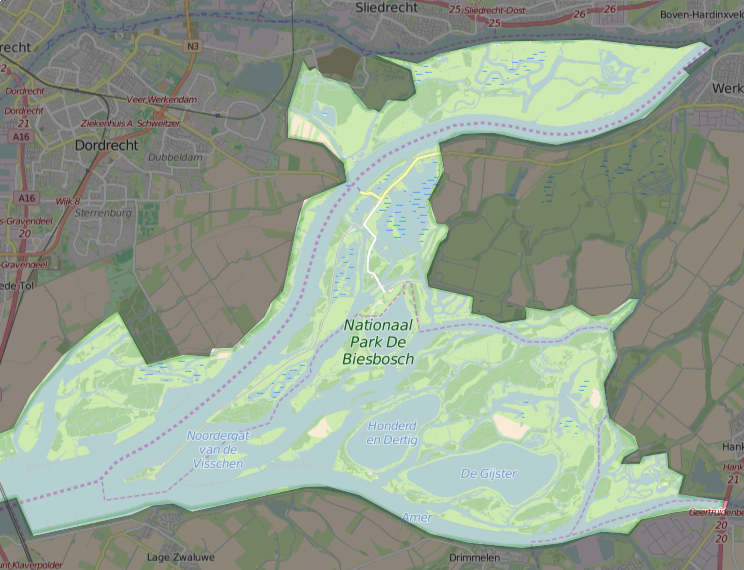
Map showing the parts of the Biesbosch that make up the National Park (highlighted).

The eastern and largest part of the Biesbosch, which is separated from the rest of the Biesbosch by the Nieuwe Merwede river (which serves as the borderline between the provinces of South Holland and North Brabant). The Brabantse Biesbosch can be divided into three parts, from which only the so-called Zuidwaard belongs to the National Park. The Zuidwaard of the Brabantse Biesbosch has fewer fields of reeds and sedges compared to the rest of the National Park and consists mostly of willow forests.

=== Other ===
The National Park occupies only half of the original Biesbosch area. The other half has been reclaimed and consists mostly of farmland. It can be divided into several parts as well:

- Dordtse Biesbosch

The part of the Biesbosch that borders the city of Dordrecht. It is located between the Sliedrechtse Biesbosch and the Hollandse Biesbosch. Although the Dordtse Biesbosch has largely an agricultural destination, it also contains several recreational areas which serves as the "playground" for the people of Dordrecht.

- Brabantse Biesbosch (Noordwaard)

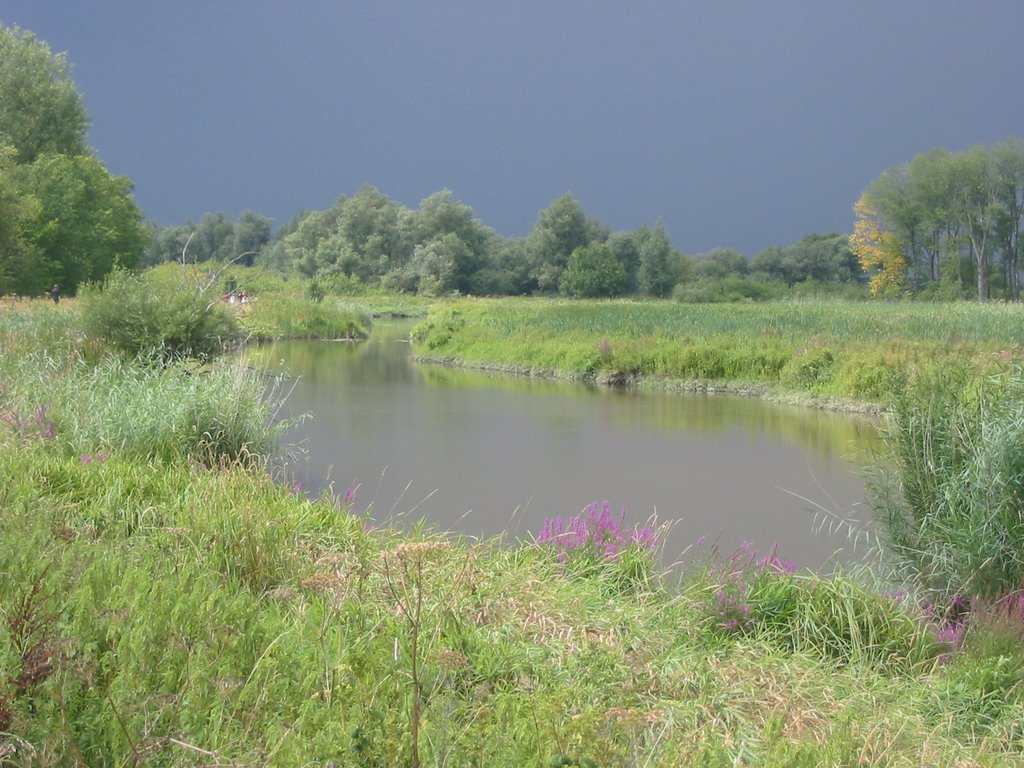
Creek remnant in the Biesbosch.

The most central part of the Biesbosch and the subject of much recent controversy. The Noordwaard has only been reclaimed during the 20th century and hosts some of most fertile farmlands in the entire Netherlands. However, as a result of the high water levels in the Dutch rivers during the 1990s, the government has decided to undo the reclamation and reconnect the Noordwaard to the Merwede rivers (essentially the Rhine). In this way it can serve as a buffer and be of much importance in the prevention of dike breaks and subsequent flooding in densely populated areas in the Rhine-Meuse-Scheldt delta. The first phase of the "de-poldering" has been completed by 2008 and the resulting wetlands have been added to the National Park. The second phase will be completed somewhere between 2015 and 2020.

- Brabantse Biesbosch (Oostwaard)

The easternmost and oldest part of the Biesbosch does not resemble the rest of the Biesbosch and consists mainly of farmland and expanded neighbourhoods of towns along the Biesbosch border (such as Werkendam, Nieuwendijk and Hank), along with a few creek remnants. Much of the Oostwaard has been reclaimed during the 17th and 18th centuries.

== Creation ==
The Biesbosch was created when 300 square kilometres of polder lands were submerged in the St. Elizabeth flood in the year 1421. Before this, the area was called Grote Hollandse Waard, containing cultivated land and a number of villages. The more than a century old dikes collapsed because of lack of maintenance, due to the difficult economic situation in the area, and the difficulties between the political entities within (especially the Hook and Cod (civil) wars).

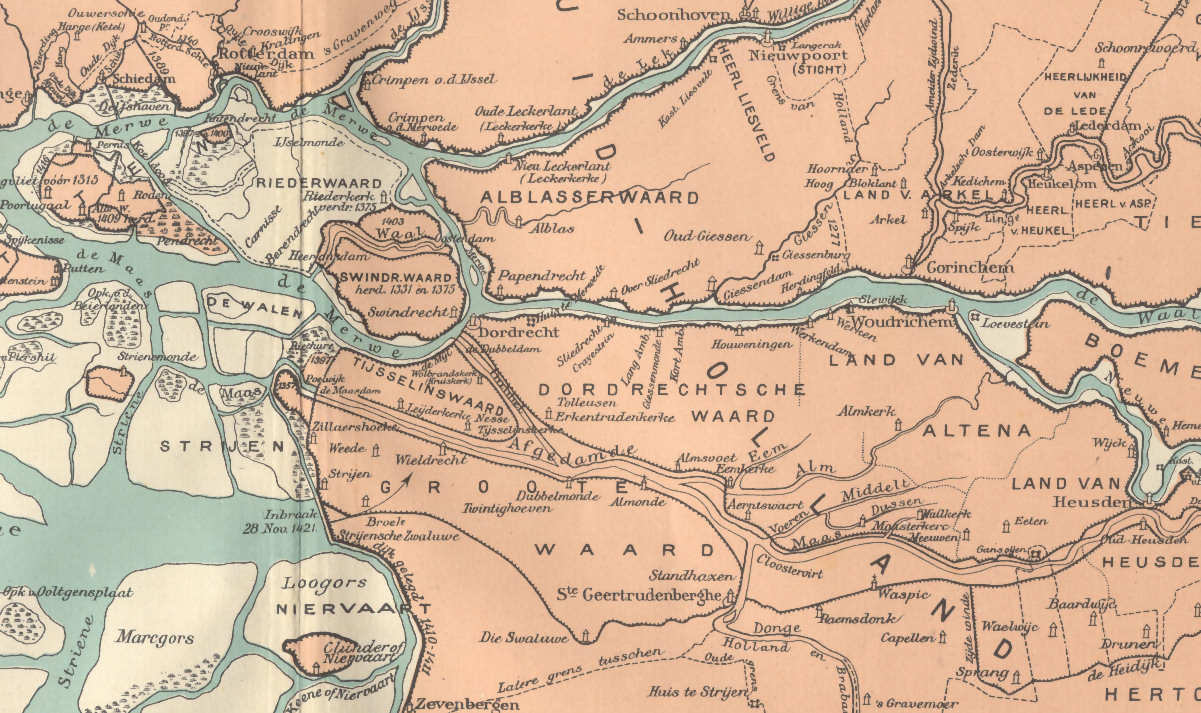
The Grote Waard in 1421, just before the St. Elizabeth flood.

One of the key factors in the flooding of the Grote Waard was the creation of a new dike in the southwest of the polder. The ground beneath this dike was unstable, which was a known (but underestimated) fact in this period of time. However, combined with political rivalry and financial issues, this resulted in the creation of an unstable dike, located at one of the key corners of the Grote Waard. It was the only place where high tides coming directly from the sea could penetrate the land deeply and could reach a primary "keystone" dike of the Grote Waard (most of the primary dikes were used as protection against rivers instead).

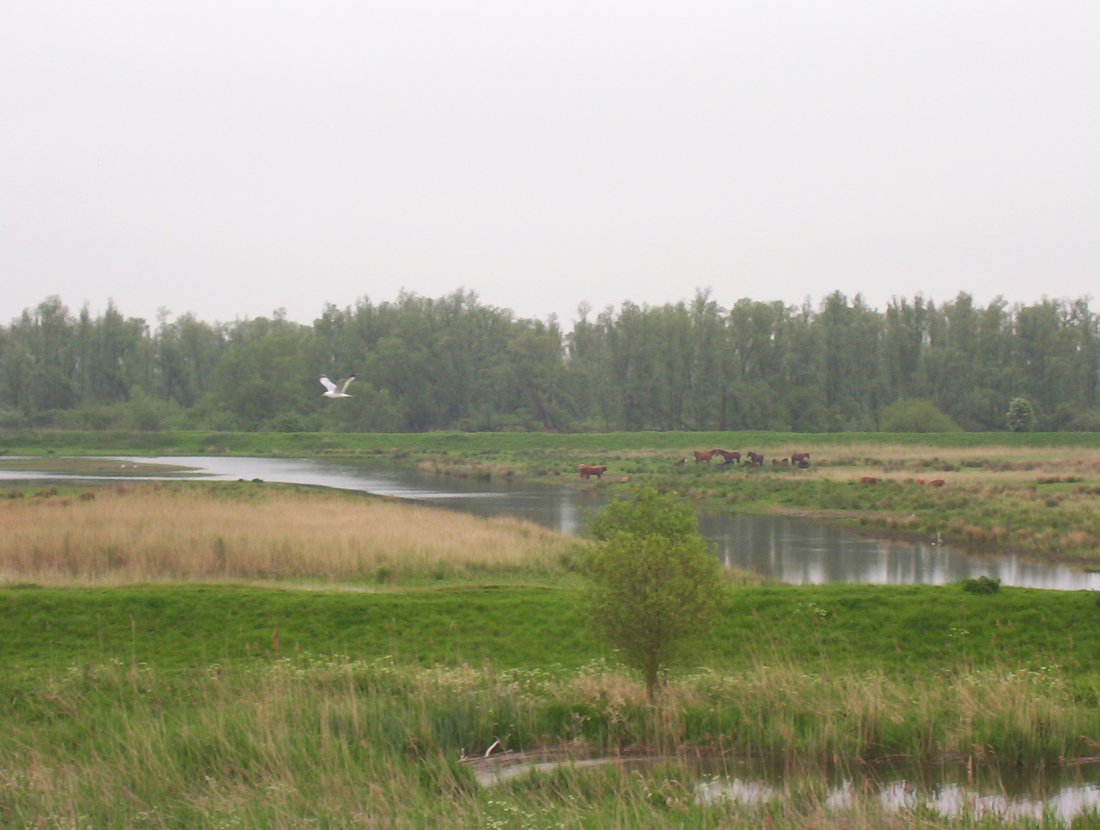
Biesbosch wetlands.

Very high river levels combined with a severe storm surge coming in from the sea caused the collapse of the southwest dike and several riverdikes, resulting in the flooding of most of the Grote Hollandse Waard. After the flood, three areas remained: the Island of Dordrecht to the west, the Land van Altena (with the city of Woudrichem) to the east, and the brackish swamps of the Biesbosch in between. Many villages (by tradition 72) were swallowed by the flood and were lost, causing (again by tradition) either 2,000 or 10,000 casualties. Some towns had more luck and submerged, only to rise above the water later on.

Many Rhine-Meuse delta branches that were closed off from the main rivers and served as drainage bodies of the Grote Waard, also disappeared. These include the Dubbel (the name of which survives in Dubbeldam), Eem, Werken (after which Werkendam is named), Graaf, Alm (which lent its name to Almkerk; the eastern part survived) and most of the main drainage stream: the Oude Maas (a small part survives in the form of the Oude Maasje, not to be confused with another branch called Oude Maas near Rotterdam).

Most of the flooded area changed into a network of estuaries. The most important of those were the Hollands Diep ("Holland Deep") and the (shallow) Heidezee ("Heath Sea"). Both were connected to the Haringvliet which existed before the disaster as a pure seawater inlet of the North Sea. After the disaster it became brackish and an important estuary of the rivers Rhine and Meuse. A persistent misunderstanding is that the Biesbosch arose by this storm flood in one night. It is true that this flood broke dikes of the then Grote Hollandse Waard or Zuid Hollandse Waard, but it needed dozens of years before the whole area was under water and had changed to the Biesbosch with its creeks and reeds.

== History ==
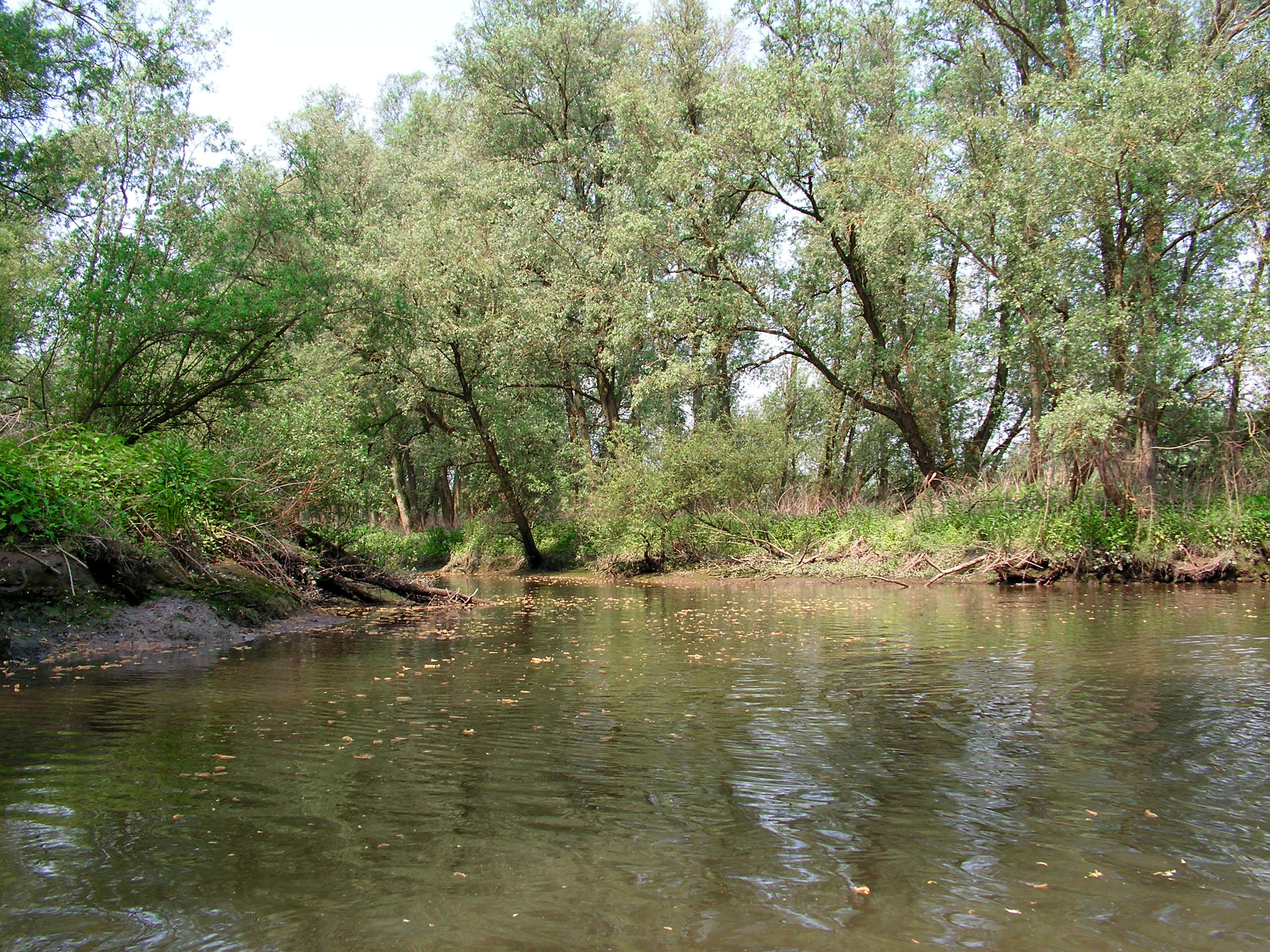
Biesbosch at low tide.

At first, the Heidezee was a shallow but extended body of water, with high tides but also a predominance of fresh water. The deposits of the rivers caused the land to become only submerged at high tides. From that moment on the area was called the Bergse Veld ("Fields of Geertruidenberg") and, later on (during the 18th century), the Biesbosch (although a small patch of swamp had been known as Biesbosch even before the flood). A network of interconnecting creeks, mudflats and forested areas arose, which served as a sort of inland delta of the large rivers feeding it. A significant result of this was that the former estuary arms of the Rhine and Meuse, further north-west, were devoid of much of the inflow of fresh water. This caused the rivers to fill with deposits, so the important shipping route between Rotterdam and the inland areas was no longer usable.

During the last centuries, conditions changed significantly. Most of the Biesbosch was reclaimed and turned into polders. The Rhine-Meuse connection with Rotterdam was restored by preventing the build-up of deposits by artificial means. Most of the Biesbosch creeks were closed off at their upstream end to lower the risk of flooding. The confluence of the Meuse and Rhine rivers was closed off as well and the Meuse received a new, artificial mouth: the Bergse Maas. By separating rivers Meuse and Rhine before they reach the Biesbosch, their flow can be controlled better. A second ship canal was created to better distribute the flow of the river Rhine as well: the Nieuwe Merwede, which divides the Biesbosch into two parts: the "lesser" Biesbosch, now the southeastern part of the Island of Dordrecht, and the "greater" Biesbosch. As a result of these hydrological changes, the Biesbosch lost its function as a river delta and now only receives water directly from the rivers in times of high discharges.

During World War II, the area was used by Dutch residents to hide out from the German occupation forces in the Netherlands. A resistance group was formed that, late in the war, captured Germans fleeing to the north from what was then the Allied-held south of the Netherlands. In the winter of 1944, the area was crossed by refugees from the occupied north, while, at the same time, it was being used to smuggle medicines to the north. The people that coordinated these activities are known as the Biesbosch crossers and are commonly regarded as national heroes. Many Dutch books and a few movies are based on this resistance group.

Before 1970 a connection with the sea existed, and the tidal differences were, on average, two meters. Despite the diminished inflow of the Meuse and Waal rivers, fresh water continued to dominate. The tidal differences almost disappeared after 1970 when the Delta Works closed the Haringvliet and with it the Biesbosch's direct connection with the sea. Only in the northern part of the Biesbosch (the so-called Sliedrechtse Biesbosch) some of the tidal difference remained (20–80 cm on average). The diminishing of the tidal difference caused a dramatic transformation of the Biesbosch, which mostly changed into a willow forest with small remnants of the once mighty delta streams. The creation of the Haringvlietdam also blocked the main route for migrating fish. The influence of both rivers and sea had now mostly gone.

== Future ==
The Dutch government has decided to undo most of the reclamation and give it back to nature and to reconnect the main rivers with the Biesbosch creeks. This decision has been made as a result of extremely high river discharges in 1993 and 1995. This means that a large part of the Biesbosch will return to its original state: an interconnected network of rivers and creeks, serving as an inland river delta. The area can then be used as a natural buffer to prevent major floods and to lower the risk of very high river levels. For example, the Noordwaard polder in the Biesbosch was reconnected with the Merwede river, to allow flooding during peak discharges of the Rhine and Meuse rivers and to reintroduce sediments which resulted in land aggradation rate of 5.1 mm. The latter is called a sedimentation enhancing strategy. Such strategies will also restore some of the natural situation and will result in an expansion of the habitat of many animals.

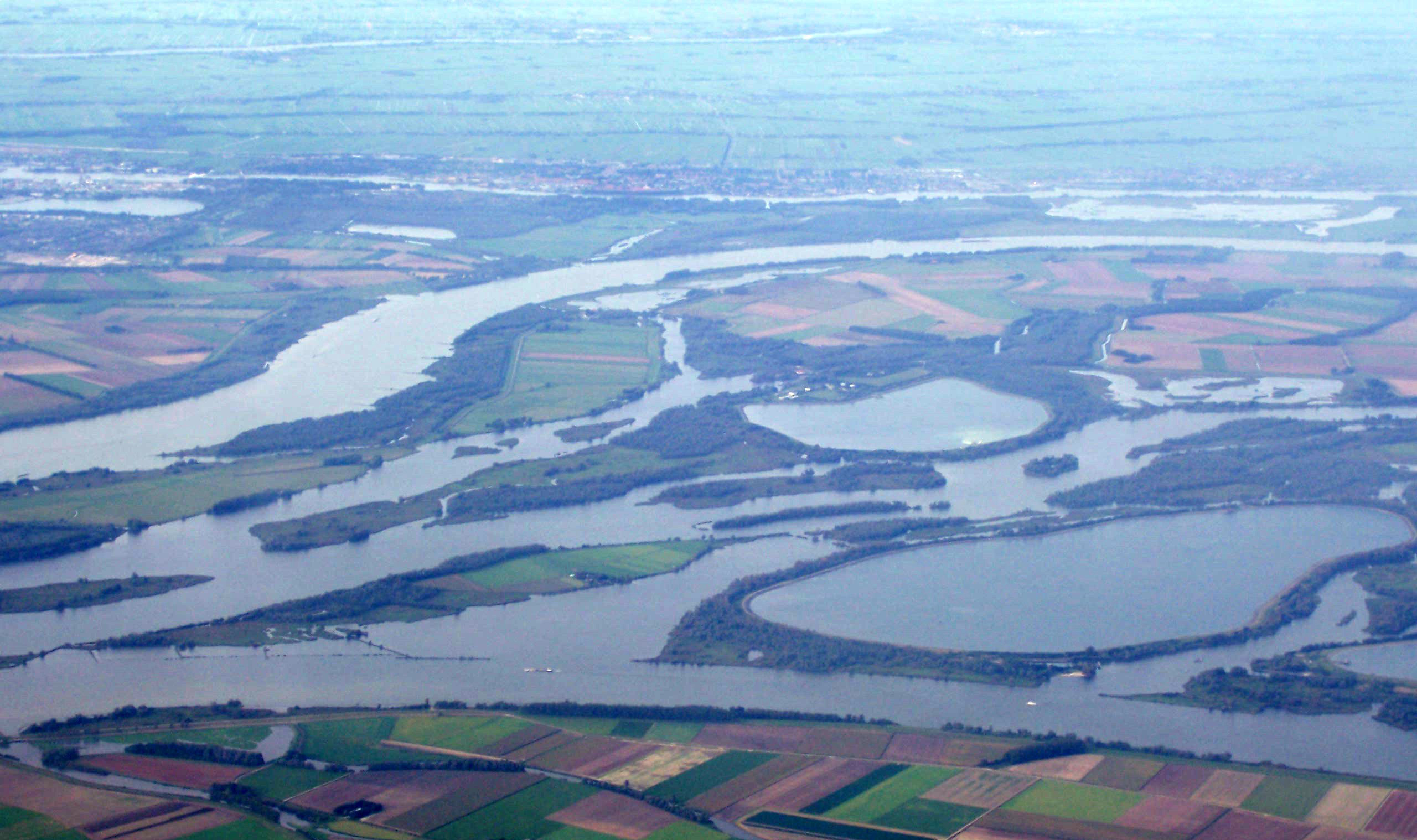
Air view of parts of the Biesbosch

Especially the beaver population could profit from these hydrological changes (and, as of 2014, they indeed expanded their range significantly). It would also hopefully create the right conditions for the return of the osprey and the white-tailed eagle as breeding birds. Because of recent nature development of new wetlands, the great egret and the little egret have already become familiar elements in the Biesbosch today. There is also an increase in the population of bitterns and kingfishers. Moreover, as of 2014 a couple of white-tailed eagles has been breeding in the Biesbosch for several years in a row. Ospreys have been using the Biesbosch as a feeding ground for several years now, with the first Dutch-born Ospreys in the spring of 2016 as a result.

There are also plans to restore the estuary function of the Haringvliet and Hollands Diep, restoring the natural shift from fresh to salty water and allow the return of the tides in the Biesbosch. A first step will be opening some of the sluices of the Haringvlietdam. This will result in a minimal return of tidal effects without having a dramatic impact on the landscape, because a full opening of the dam will make most of the surrounding farming areas unusable, as a result of the influx of salty water. One should note the fact that in times of severe floods coming from the North Sea, the dam will still be able to close and serve in a similar way as the Oosterscheldekering.

The partial opening of the Haringvlietdam will create an opportunity for migrating fish to enter the Rhine and Meuse rivers, restoring the natural situation. This will hopefully result in the return of the salmon, trout, shad, smelt and many other species of fish. It will also create opportunities for the almost extinct southern Dutch population of seals (now mostly restricted to parts of the Oosterschelde). Seals used to be a common sight in the Biesbosch despite the fact that the area is dominated by freshwater. Their presence ended in 1970, although a few individuals somehow managed to reach the Biesbosch afterwards. The partial opening of the Haringvlietdam will restore some of the natural situation.

In the future possibly moose will be re-introduced in the area.

== Threats ==
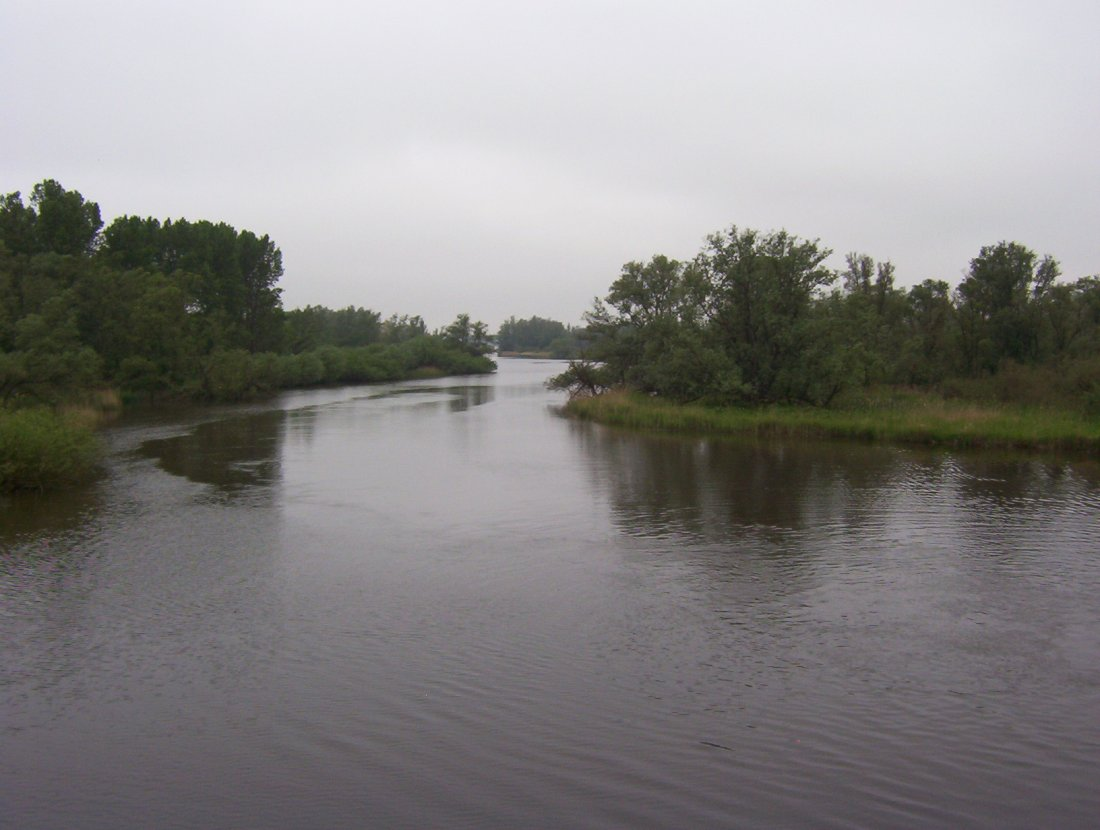
Typical Biesbosch creek.

The area still faces many threats. One of them is the pollution of water and soil. Many streambeds contain severely polluted sediments, a remainder from the sixties and seventies, when the rivers Rhine and Meuse were much more polluted than they are today. Because there is little net flow in the Biesbosch (because the connection with both rivers and the sea has been blocked, although this will change in the future) the build-up of polluted sediments in the Biesbosch has been severe. Completely restoring the Biesbosch ecosystem cannot happen without an extensive cleanup of all the creeks, which will be an enormous and costly task.

Another threat to the Biesbosch ecosystem is the extensive water recreation in the area. The Biesbosch has, however, both strong natural and recreational values, so banning all recreational activities in the area is not an option. Finding the right balance in this issue will be a challenge. Other threats include the construction of yacht-basins, urban expansion and plans for exploitation of natural gas reserves.
