= Oude Maasje =

Coordinates: 51.7072°N 4.9375°E

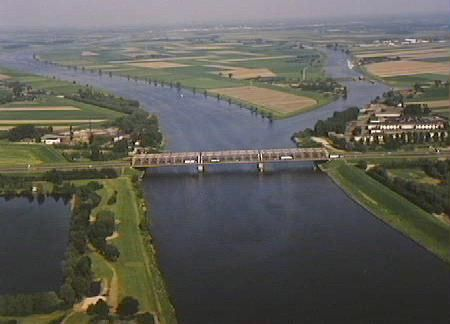
- Keizersveer bridge across the Bergse Maas near Geertruidenberg; to the right, the mouth of the Oude Maasje

Location
- Country: The Netherlands
- Region: North Brabant

Physical characteristics
- Source
  - location: Maas, near Heusden
- Mouth
  - location: Bergse Maas, near Geertruidenberg

Basin features
- River system: Maas

The Oude Maasje ("Little Old Meuse") is a former distributary of the river Maas (or Meuse), which runs parallel to the current canalised Bergse Maas.

== History ==
The hydrological distribution of the Maas changed during the later Middle Ages, when a major flood forced it to shift its main course towards the Merwede river. However, during another series of severe floods the Maas found an additional path towards the sea near Geertruidenberg, resulting in the creation of the Biesbosch wetlands and Hollands Diep estuaries. Thereafter, the Maas split near Heusden into two main distributaries, one flowing north to join the Merwede, and one flowing directly to the sea. This latter branch is the current Oude Maasje. The branch eventually silted up, and in 1904 a new parallel channel was dug in the drainage basin, the Bergse Maas. This channel then took over the functions of the silted-up branch, which has since been known as the Oude Maasje. At the same time, the branch leading to the Merwede was dammed at Heusden, (and has since been known as the Afgedamde Maas) so that the vast majority of water from the Maas now enters the old Hollands Diep estuary, rather than mixing with the Rhine distributaries.

Like many old river beds in the Netherlands, the Oude Maasje now primarily acts to drain the surrounding fields, and does not receive water from the Maas river. However, it drains into the Bergse Maas near Geertruidenberg, therefore retaining a connection with the Maas.
