= Munte =

Munte may refer to:

- Munte (Belgium), part of the Belgian municipality of Merelbeke
- Munte (Karo Regency), an [Indonesian district of the regency of Karo (North Sumatra)
- Munte (Netherlands), a river located in the province of Groningen; see List of rivers of the Netherlands
