= Keeten-Mastgat =

The Keeten-Mastgat is a body of water in the Dutch province of Zeeland. It used to be an estuary of the Rhine and Meuse rivers, but today it is only connected to the Oosterschelde. It still receives some water from its former tributaries, but only when the Krammer-Volkerak receives too much water from the Hollands Diep.

It lies between the islands of Schouwen-Duiveland and Tholen.
