= Merwede =

River in the Netherlands

Coordinates: 51°49′N 4°40′E

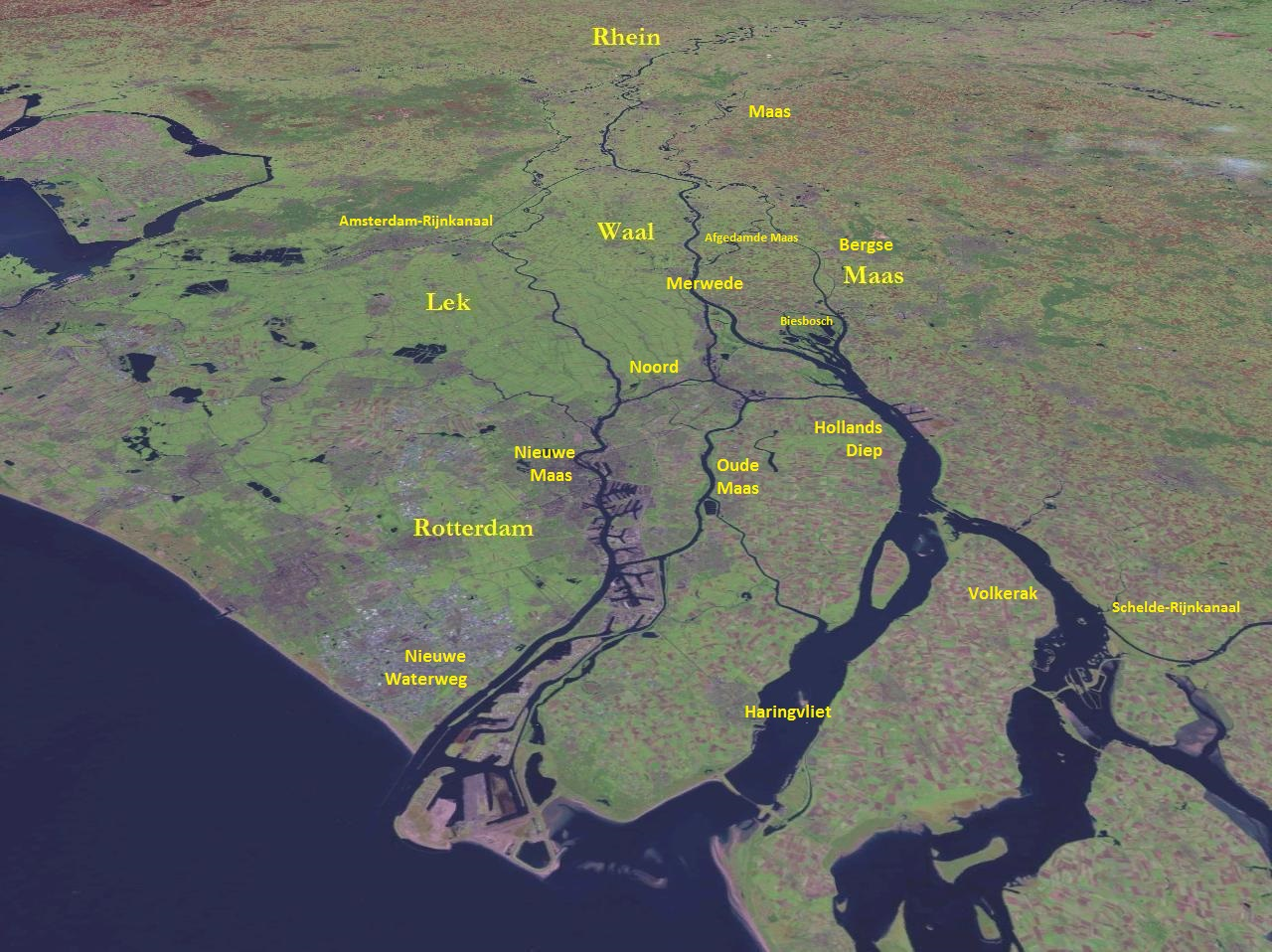
The lower part of the Rhine–Meuse delta

The Merwede (Dutch pronunciation: [ˈmɛrʋeːdə]; etymology uncertain, possibly derived from the Old Dutch merwe or merowe, a word meaning "wide water") is the name of several connected stretches of river in the Netherlands, between the cities of Woudrichem, Dordrecht and Papendrecht. The river is part of the Rhine–Meuse–Scheldt delta and is mostly fed by the river Rhine.

At first, a disconnected branch of the Meuse joins the Waal at Woudrichem to form the Boven Merwede (Upper Merwede). A few kilometers downstream it splits into the Beneden Merwede (Lower Merwede) on the right and the Nieuwe Merwede (New Merwede) on the left. All these rivers are tidal. The Nieuwe Merwede joins the Bergse Maas near Lage Zwaluwe to form the Hollands Diep estuary, and separates the Island of Dordrecht from the Biesbosch National Park. The Beneden Merwede splits into the Noord River and Oude Maas near Papendrecht.

== History ==
In medieval times the name Merwede (or "Merwe" in Middle Dutch) was the name of a continuous stretch of river, considered to be the lower part of the river Waal (a major distributary branch of the Rhine), and carried on its name all the way to the sea. Later on, the name Merwede was discarded downstream of the town of Papendrecht and replaced with Noord river and, even further downstream, Nieuwe Maas. Only the part of the river between Woudrichem en Papendrecht retained its name.

The confusing river names are the result of two major flood events, which both resulted in a significant shift in the course and flow of the lower rivers. The first of these events forced the river Meuse (Maas) to take a more northerly course and created a direct connection between the Meuse and the Merwede at the town of Woudrichem. The names of several stretches of the lower rivers were then changed to reflect this, for example the Oude Maas and Nieuwe Maas.

During a second flooding event (the St. Elizabeth floods) a major breach in the coastal dunes of Holland created an inlet that would eventually reach the Merwede, thus creating a new, more southerly and shorter path to the sea. Most of the flow of the river Meuse, and a considerable part of the flow of the Rhine (by means of the Waal), were rerouted to this new pathway (the current Biesbosch, Hollands Diep and Haringvliet). From that time on, the Oude Maas and Nieuwe Maas received little water from the Meuse. In recent centuries the influence of the Meuse has decreased even further, to the point that the major stretches of river called Oude Maas and Nieuwe Maas have been essentially cut off from the river Meuse completely.

Both the current Merwede and all of its lower stretches (now called Noord river, Oude Maas and Nieuwe Maas) are now consequently almost exclusively fed by the Rhine, while the Meuse has been given its own artificial mouth, Bergse Maas, and the two rivers Rhine and Meuse are now mostly separated to reduce the risk of flooding. This separation of the rivers Rhine and Maas is considered to be the greatest achievement in Dutch hydraulic engineering before the completion of the Zuiderzee Works and Delta Works.

The Merovingian dynasty probably derived its name from this river.
