= Noordtunnel =

Coordinates: 51°51′27″N 4°39′13″E

Noord Tunnel
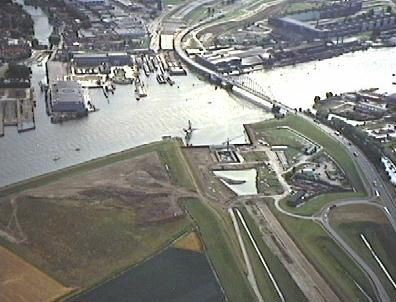
- The Noord Tunnel during construction and the bridge it replaced.

Overview
- Location: Alblasserdam - Hendrik-Ido-Ambacht
- Status: Active

Operation
- Opened: 1992
- Traffic: Automotive

Technical
- Length: 1.270 m

The Noord Tunnel is a tunnel under the Noord on the motorway A15 around Rotterdam.

== History ==
The Noord Tunnel was built between 1988 and 1993 for a cost of 136 million euros. The Dutch banking group ING led the financing for the construction, and sealed a deal with the Dutch government which specified that the government would pay ING a fee for each car that uses the tunnel, which opened in 1992. By 2001, ING was reimbursed its investment, but the government kept paying the banking group since the deal was supposed to run until 2021. By 2013, the tunnel had earned ING 355 million euros, paid by the Dutch taxpayers.

== Description ==
The bridge that it replace now serves local traffic and dangerous materials that are not allowed into the tunnel.

The tunnel is a three-lane twin tube with a central duct. Its total length is 1,300m, of which 490m are immersed.
