= Oude Maas =

Distributary of the Rhine River in South Holland, Netherlands

Coordinates: 51°53′N 4°19′E

Oude Maas Old Meuse
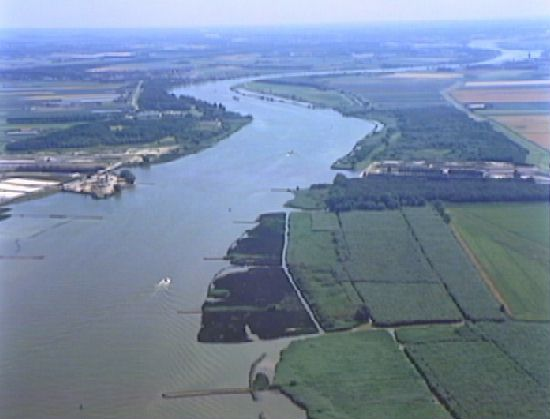

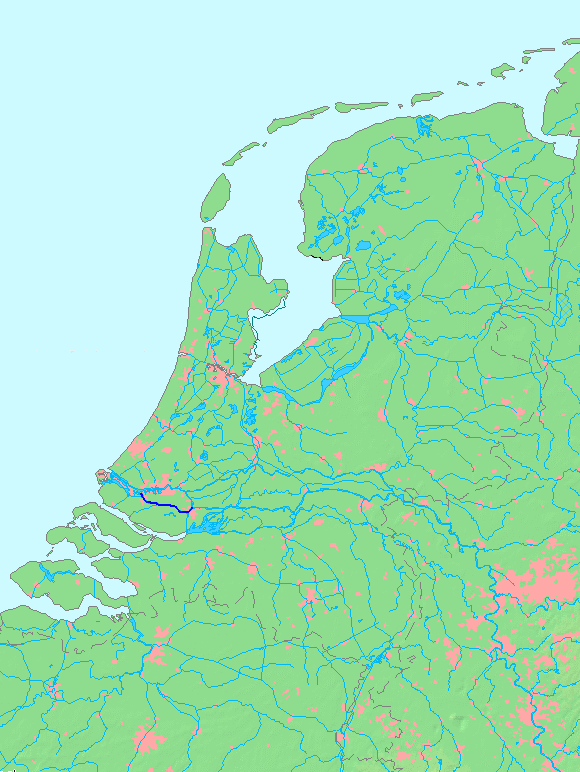
- Location of Oude Maas in dark blue.

Location
- Country: Netherlands

Physical characteristics
- Source: Beneden Merwede
  - location: Dordrecht
- Mouth: Nieuwe Maas
  - location: Vlaardingen
- Length: 30 km (19 mi)

The Oude Maas (Dutch pronunciation: [ˌʌudə ˈmaːs]; English: Old Meuse) is a distributary of the river Rhine, and a former distributary of the river Maas, in the Dutch province of South Holland. It begins at the city of Dordrecht where the Beneden Merwede river splits into the Noord and the Oude Maas. It ends when it joins the Nieuwe Maas to form Het Scheur.

== Geography ==
The Oude Maas forms the southern boundary of the IJsselmonde island. Soon after Dordrecht the Dordtsche Kil forks off and after that the Oude Maas forms the northern boundary of the Hoeksche Waard island, flowing west until the Spui river forks off at the town of Oud-Beijerland. The Oude Maas then heads northwest between the towns/cities of Spijkenisse and Hoogvliet and joins the river Nieuwe Maas opposite the city of Vlaardingen. The combined river is known as Het Scheur and flows to the North Sea.

The river is tidal and has nature and recreation areas.

== History ==
During the early Middle Ages the main flow of the Maas followed the current Oude Maas. During the later Middle Ages, a flooding event caused the Oude Maas to connect to the Merwede rivers. From that moment on, the Oude Maas was fed by both the Maas and the Rhine. However, after the St. Elizabeth's floods the Merwede found a new and shorter path to the sea (the current Hollands Diep). As a result, the Oude Maas was devoid from much of the inflow of fresh water and changed into a brackish estuary. When the flow of the Merwede was better distributed among its lower branches (due to artificial means), the Oude Maas was once again a major distributary branch of both the Maas and Rhine.

In the late 19th century the connection between the Maas and Rhine was closed off entirely (the current Afgedamde Maas) and the Maas was given a new, artificial mouth - the Bergse Maas. The resulting separation of the rivers Rhine and Maas reduced the risk of flooding and is considered to be the greatest achievement in Dutch hydraulic engineering before the completion of the Zuiderzee Works and Delta Works. From that moment on, the Oude Maas is only fed by the Rhine.

== Transport ==
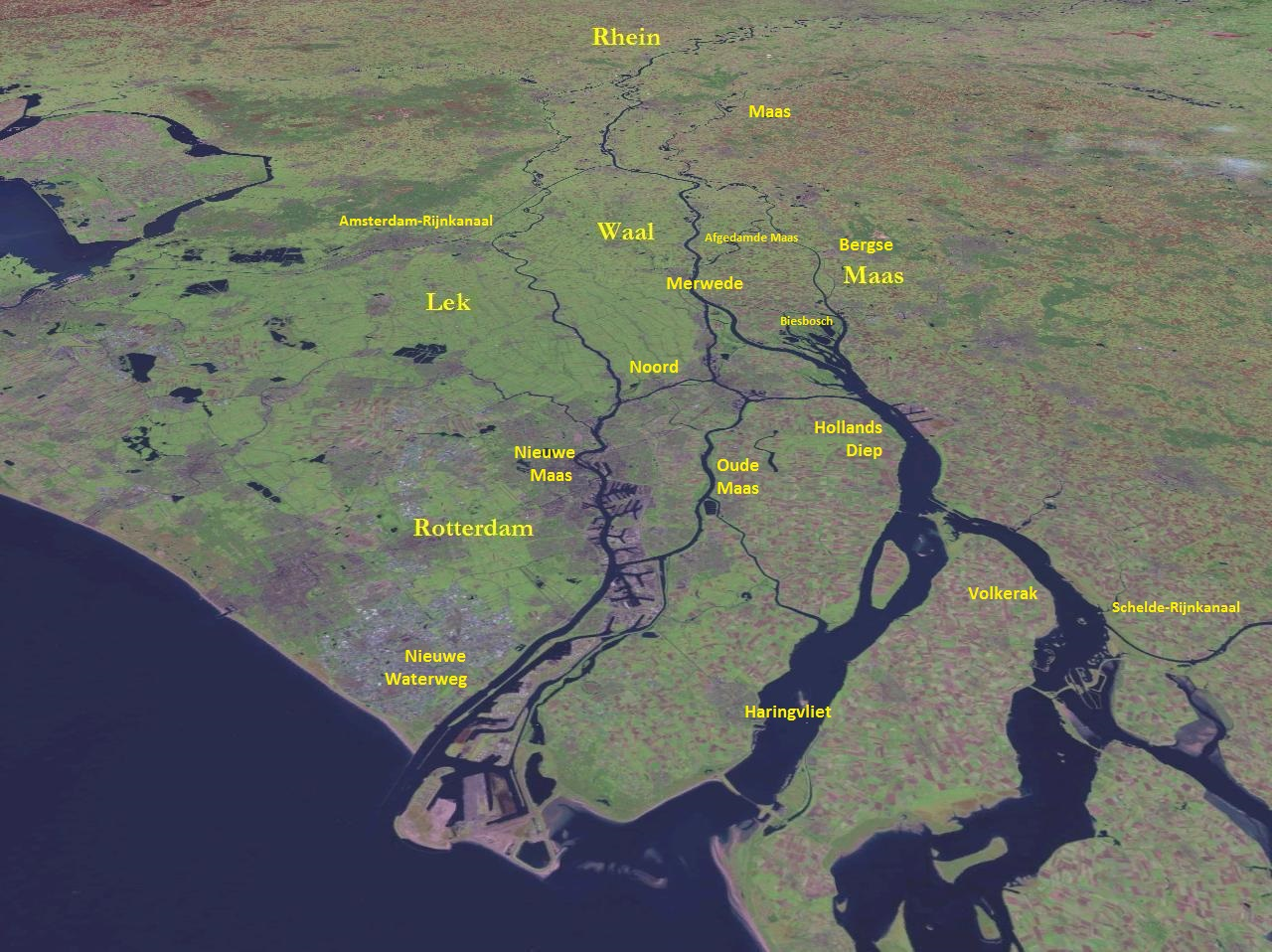
The lower part of the Rhine-Meuse Delta

Connections from the IJsselmonde island on the north:

- with Dordrecht island:
  - road bridge
  - road tunnel
  - railway bridge
- with Hoeksche Waard island:
  - 1st and 2nd Heinenoordtunnel (motor vehicles, cyclists)
- with Voorne-Putten island:
  - Spijkenisser Bridge (motor vehicles, cyclists, pedestrians)
  - metro tunnel

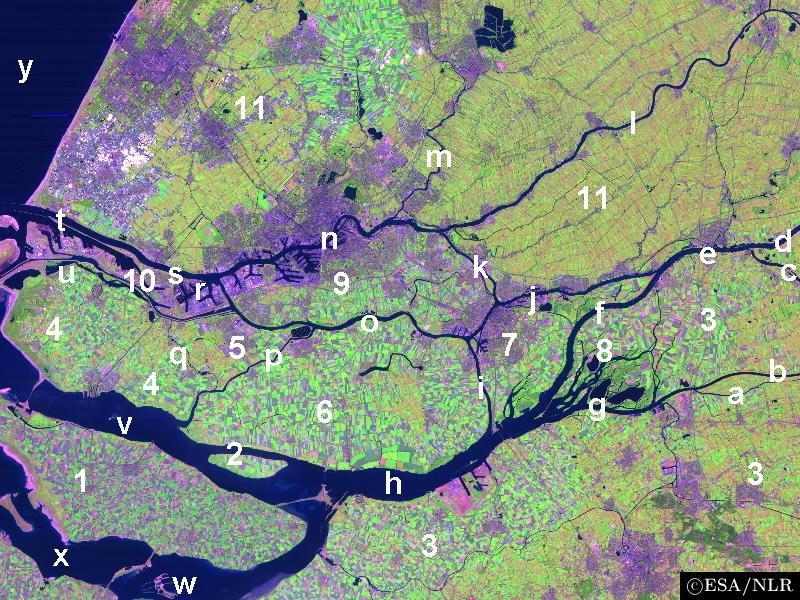
Satellite image of the northwest part of the Rhine-Meuse delta showing river Oude Maas (o).
