= Nieuwe Merwede =

Canal in the Netherlands

Coordinates: 51°47′15″N 4°45′50″E

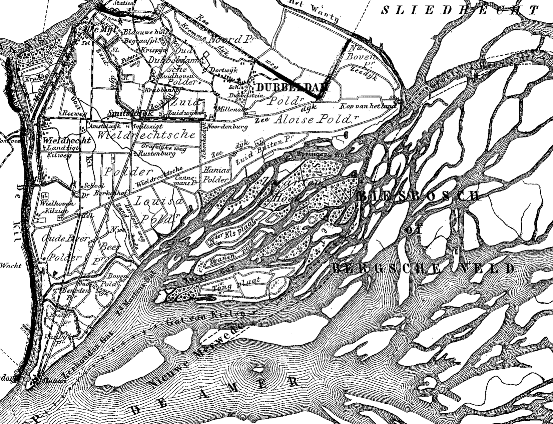
The projected trajectory of the Nieuwe Merwede canal, circa 1868 (dotted lines).

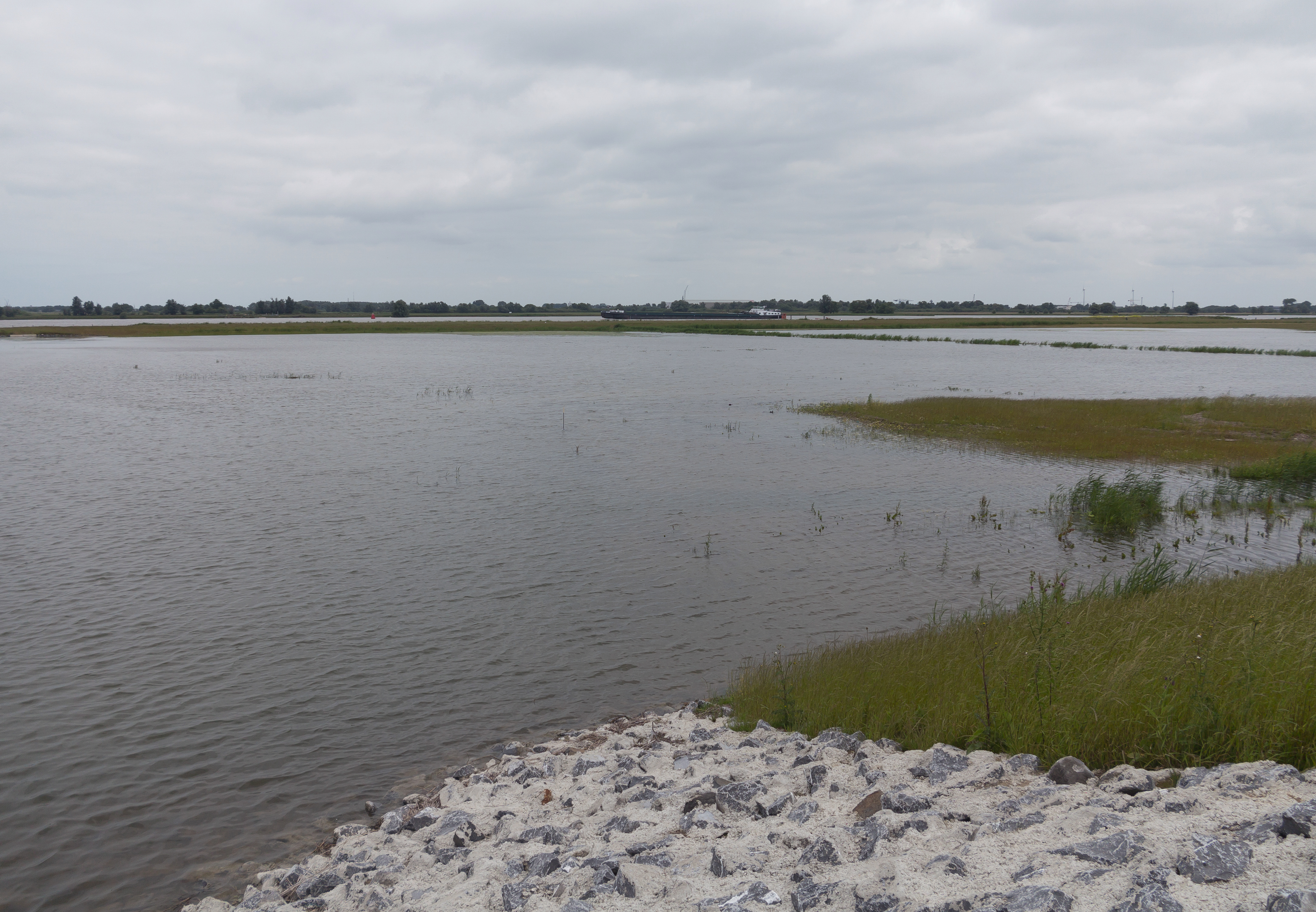
The Nieuwe Merwede from Kievitswaard

The Nieuwe Merwede (Dutch pronunciation: [ˌniu.ə ˈmɛrʋeːdə]; "New Merwede") is a Dutch canal, mainly fed by the river Rhine, that was constructed in 1870 to form a branch in the Rhine–Meuse delta. It was dug along the general trajectories of a number of minor Biesbosch creeks to reduce the risk of flooding by diverting the water away from the Beneden Merwede, and to facilitate navigation and regulate river traffic in the increasingly silted-up delta.

It is one of several rivers called Merwede. The most upstream is the river Boven Merwede ("Upper Merwede"), itself the continuation of the Rhine-Waal river and, until 1904, the Meuse (now the closed-off Afgedamde Maas) as well. The Boven Merwede branches near the town of Hardinxveld-Giessendam into River Beneden Merwede ("Lower Merwede") to the northwest and the Nieuwe Merwede to the southwest. The Nieuwe Merwede joins River Bergse Maas near Lage Zwaluwe to form the Hollands Diep estuary, and separates the Island of Dordrecht from the Biesbosch National Park.

There are no bridges or tunnels crossing the Nieuwe Merwede, but there is a car ferry from the Island of Dordrecht on the west at "Kop van 't Land" to Brabantse Oever, Werkendam (Biesbosch).
