= Noord (river) =

Coordinates: 51°51′04″N 4°39′28″E

Noord North
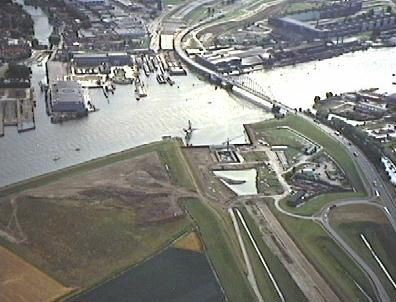
- Near Alblasserdam

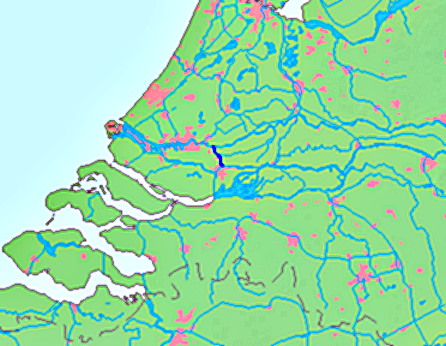
- Location of the Noord in dark blue.

Location
- Country: Netherlands
- Province: South Holland

Physical characteristics
- Source: Beneden Merwede
  - location: Dordrecht
- Mouth: Nieuwe Maas
  - location: Ridderkerk
- Length: 9 km (5.6 mi)

The Noord ("North") is a short tidal river in the western Netherlands, in the province of South Holland.

The Noord starts at the city of Dordrecht where the Beneden Merwede river forks into the Oude Maas and the Noord. It joins the Lek at the city of Ridderkerk and Kinderdijk, and the combined stream is thereafter known as the Nieuwe Maas. The distance is about nine kilometres. The direction of its water flow depends on the tides.

The Noord River separates IJsselmonde island from the Alblasserwaard mainland to the east. There are two connections between them:

- The bridge over the Noord (motor vehicles, cyclists)
- Noord Tunnel (motor vehicles)

== History ==
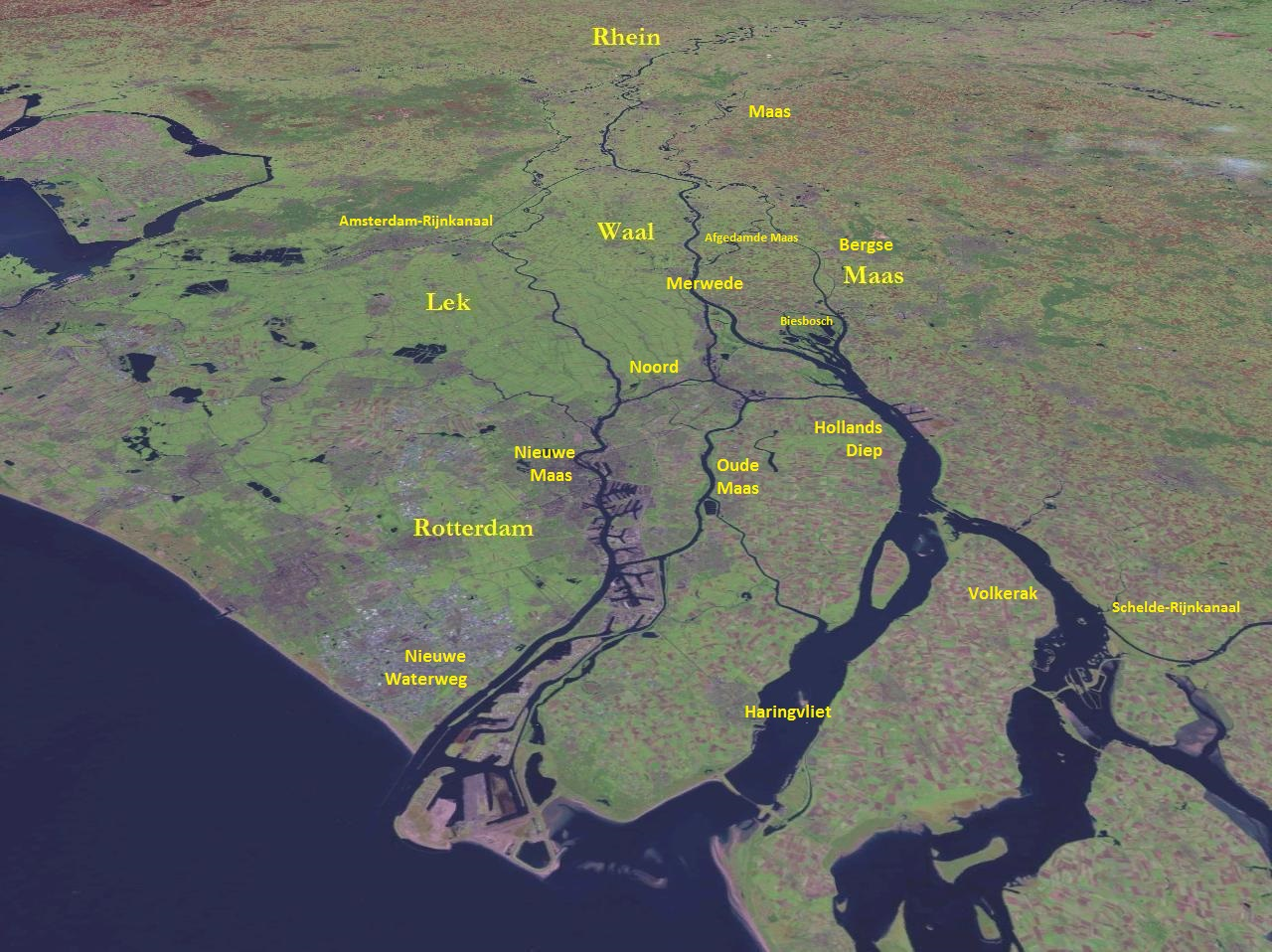
The lower part of the Rhine-Meuse Delta

During the early Middle Ages, the river was considered to be the continuation of the Merwede river (itself a distributary branch of the Rhine) and was named accordingly. However, as a result of the St. Elizabeth's floods the Merwede found a new and shorter path to the sea (the current Hollands Diep) and the stretch leading north changed into a brackish estuary. From that moment on, it was called the Noord. When the flow of the Merwede was better distributed among its lower branches (due to artificial means), the Noord returned to its former state as a tidal freshwater river, but the name remained Noord.
