= Nieuwe Maas =

River in South Holland, the Netherlands

Coordinates: 51°54′N 4°20′E

Nieuwe Maas New Meuse
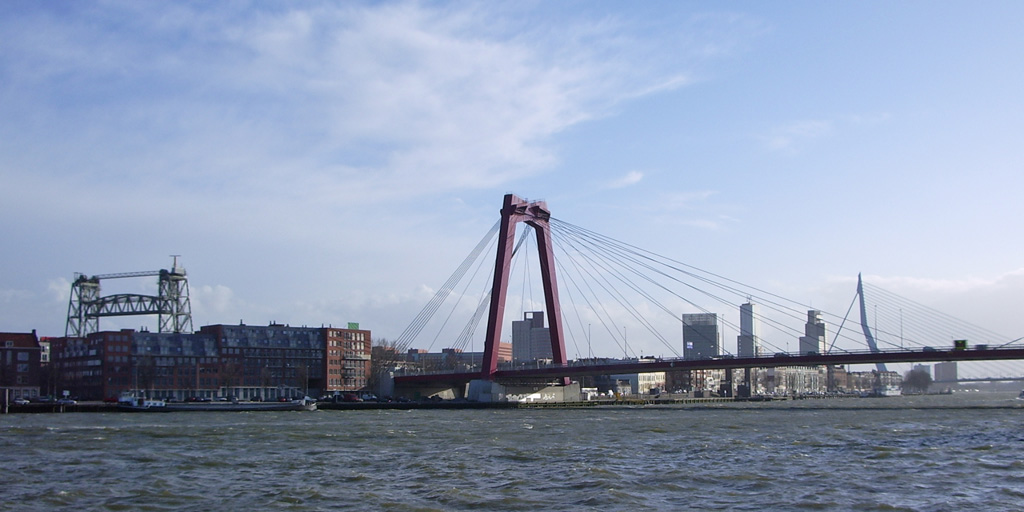
- Nieuwe Maas in the heart of Rotterdam

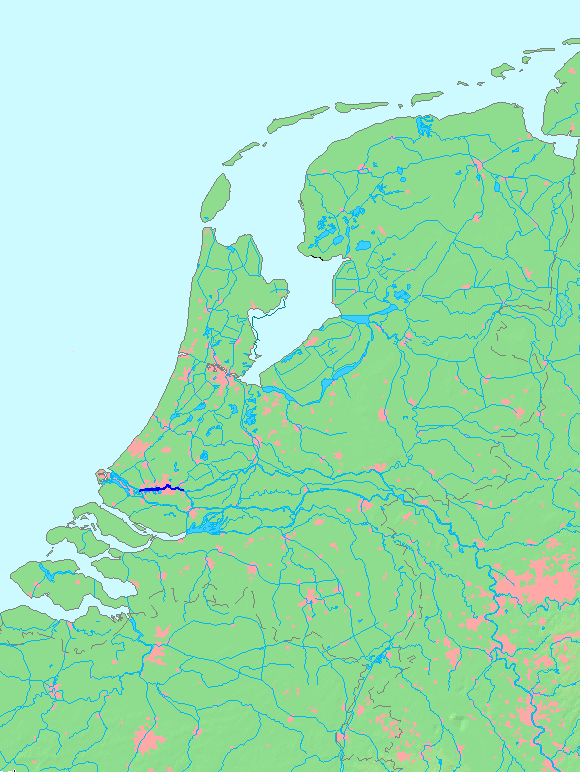
- Location of Nieuwe Maas in dark blue

Location
- Country: Netherlands

Physical characteristics
- Source: Lek / Noord
  - location: Ridderkerk
- Mouth: Scheur
  - location: Vlaardingen
- Length: 24 km (15 mi)

The Nieuwe Maas (Dutch pronunciation: [ˌniu.ə ˈmaːs]; "New Meuse") is a distributary of the Rhine River, and a former distributary of the Maas River, in the Dutch province of South Holland. It runs from the confluence of the rivers Noord and Lek, and flows west through Rotterdam. It ends west of the city where it meets the Oude Maas ("Old Meuse"), near Vlaardingen, to form Scheur. After a few miles, the Scheur continues as the artificial Nieuwe Waterweg. The total length of the Nieuwe Maas (excluding the Scheur) is approximately 24 kilometres (15 mi).

== Geography ==
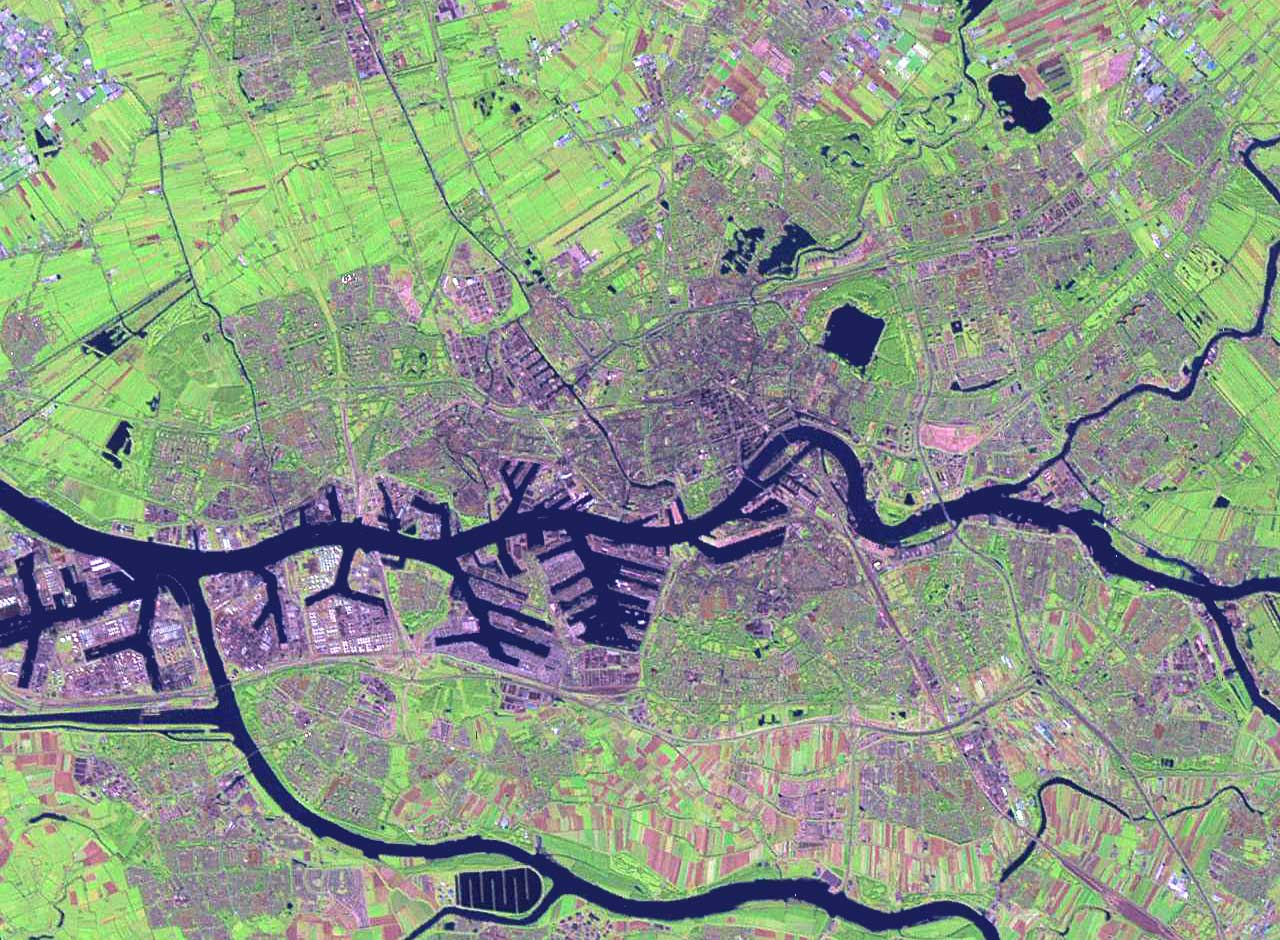
Satellite image showing the Nieuwe Maas going through Rotterdam. Also visible are the confluence of the Noord and Lek rivers (right edge) and the Oude Maas (bottom of the image).

The Nieuwe Maas flows through some of the most densely populated and developed areas in the Netherlands. Along its shores are numerous harbours and industries.

== History ==
During the early Middle Ages the river was considered to be the continuation of the Merwede river (itself a distributary branch of the Rhine) and was named accordingly. However, during the 13th century a series of floods forced the Maas to shift its main course north towards the Merwede. From then on, several stretches of the original Merwede were named Maas instead, including the current Nieuwe Maas.

In the late 19th century the connection between the Maas and Rhine was closed off entirely (the current Afgedamde Maas) and the Maas was given a new, artificial mouth - the Bergse Maas. The resulting separation of the rivers Rhine and Maas reduced the risk of flooding and is considered to be the greatest achievement in Dutch hydraulic engineering before the completion of the Zuiderzee Works and Delta Works. From that moment on, the Nieuwe Maas is only fed by the Rhine.

== River crossings ==
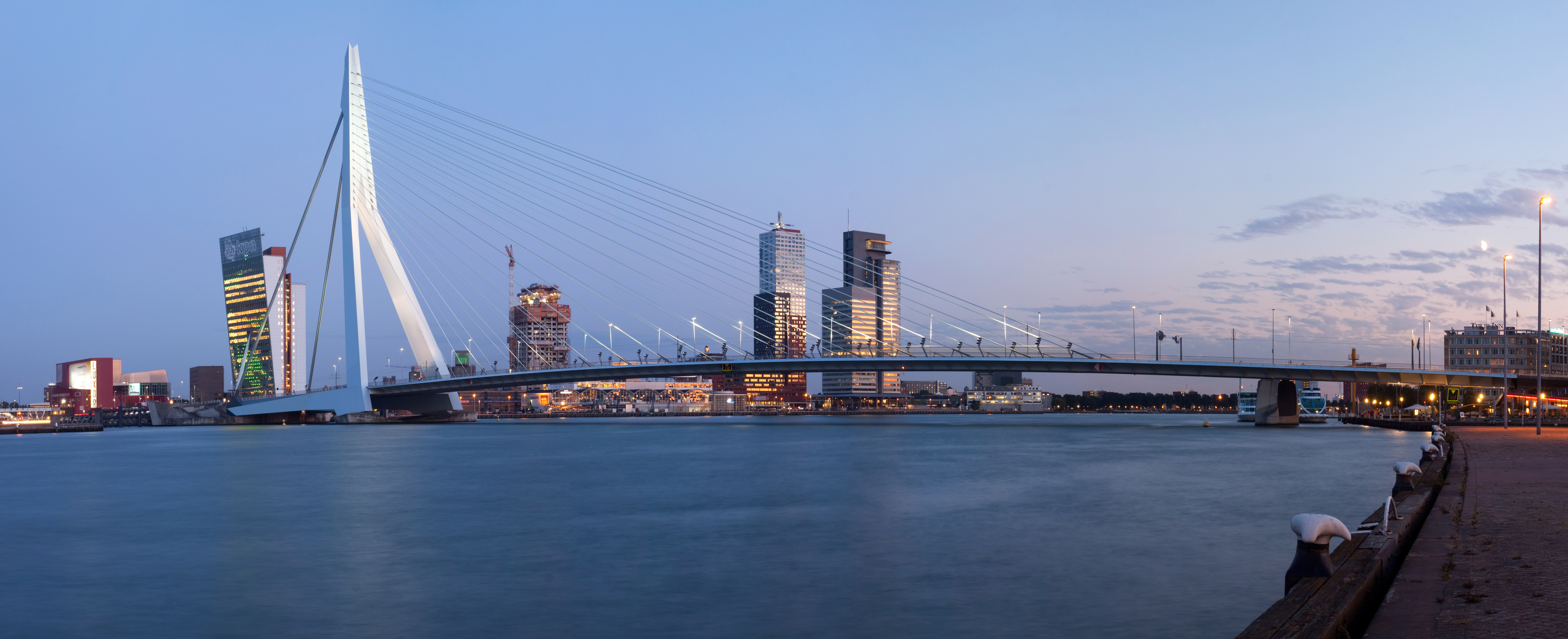
The Erasmusbrug ("Erasmus Bridge") across the Nieuwe Maas in Rotterdam.

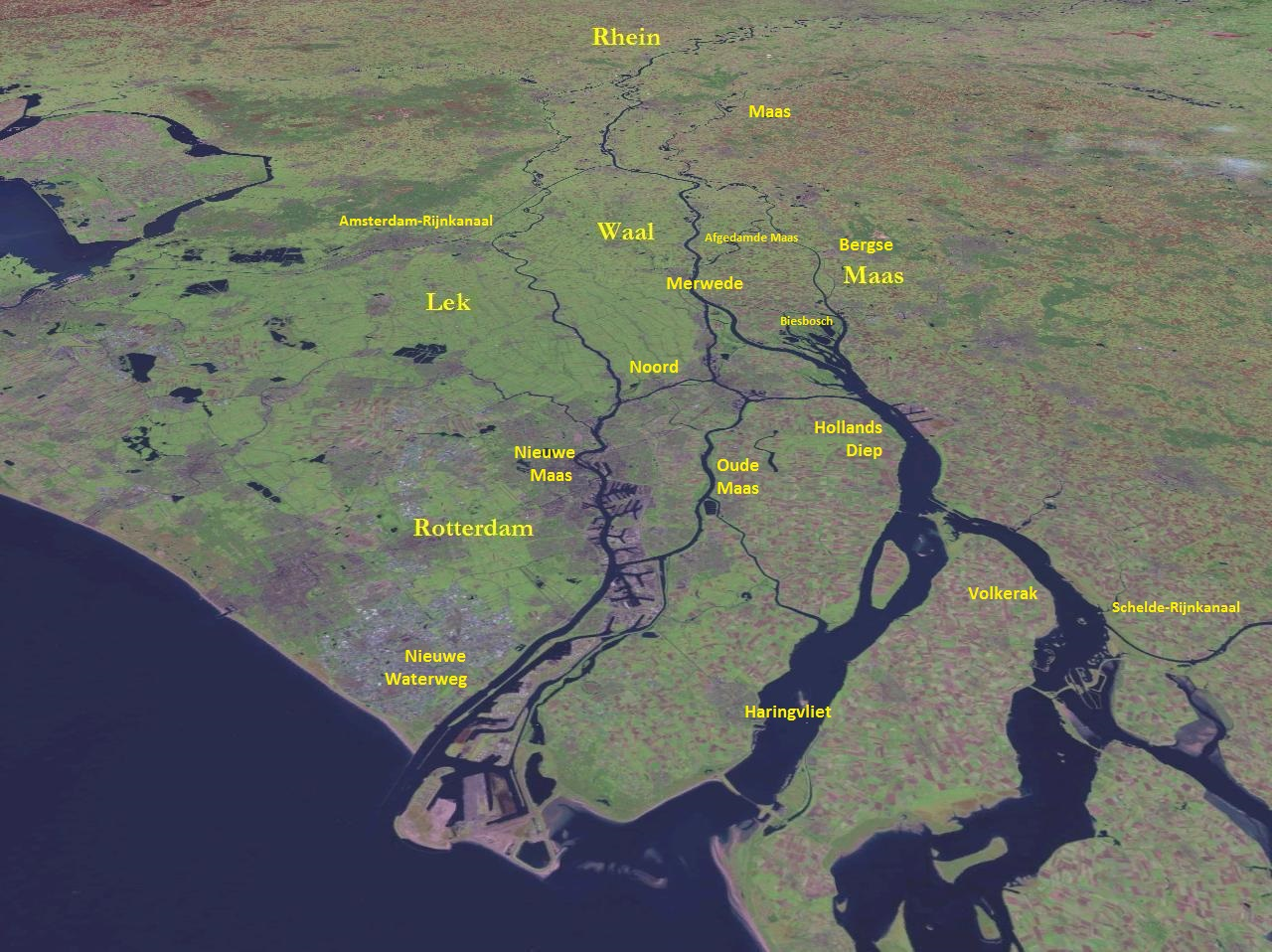
The lower part of the Rhine-Meuse Delta

From west to east:

- Beneluxtunnel (tunnel; motor vehicles, cyclists and metro)
- Maastunnel (tunnel; motor vehicles, cyclists, pedestrians)
- Erasmusbrug (bridge; motor vehicles, cyclists, pedestrians, trams)
- Maastaxi (ferry; pedestrians)
- Metrotunnel (tunnel; metro)
- Willemstunnel (tunnel; train)
- Willemsbrug (bridge; motor vehicles, cyclists, pedestrians)
- Van Brienenoordbrug (bridge; motor vehicles, cyclists, pedestrians)
