= Lek (river) =

Coordinates: 51.89034°N 4.63156°E

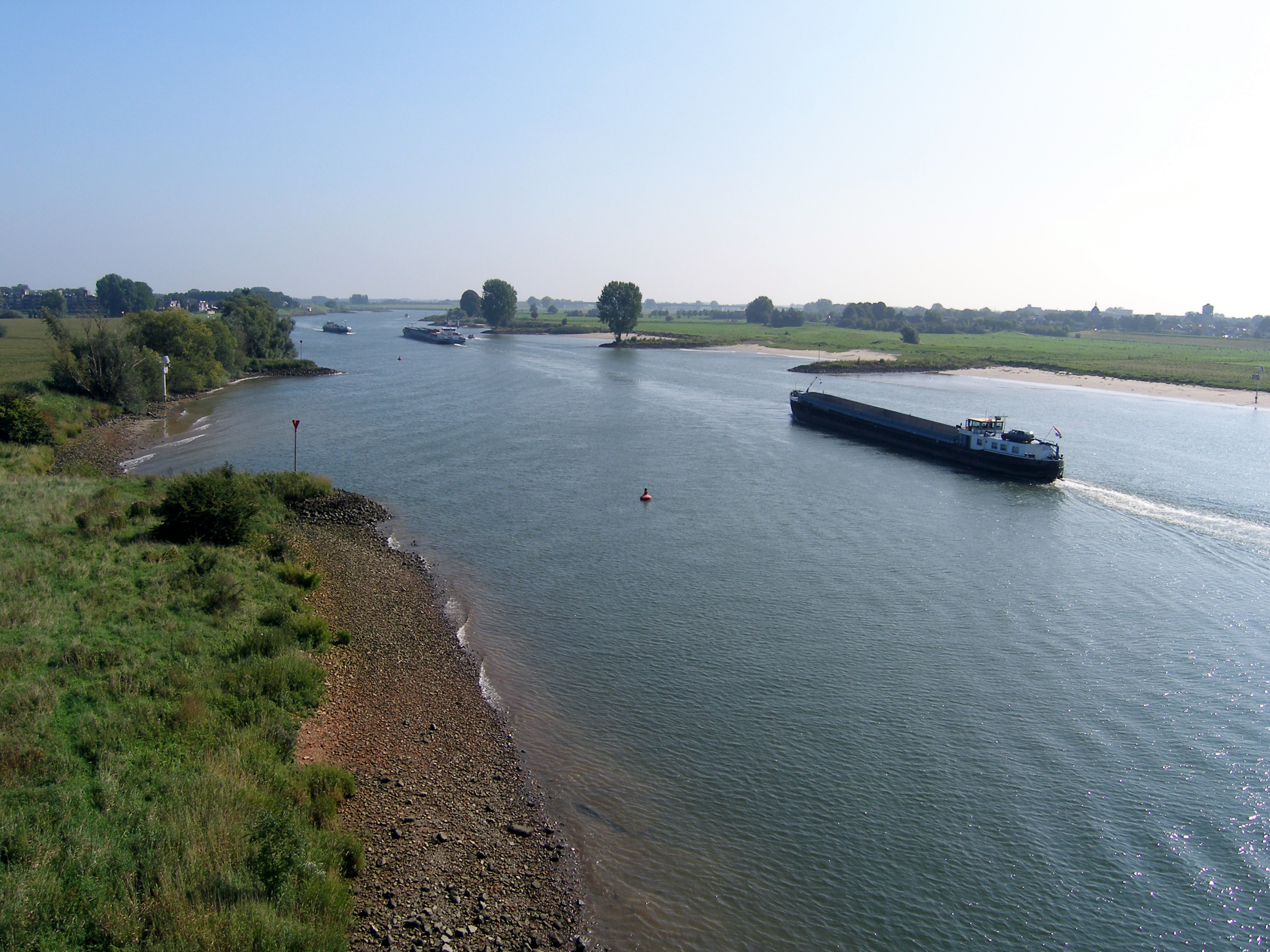
- The Lek River near Nieuwegein.

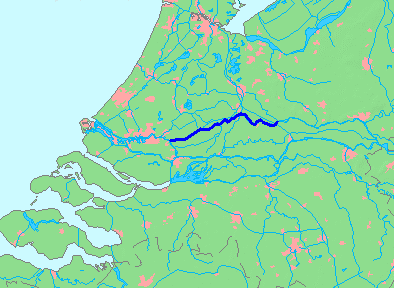
- Location of Lek in dark blue.

Location
- Country: Netherlands
- Region: Utrecht, South Holland

Physical characteristics
- Source: Nederrijn
  - location: Wijk bij Duurstede, Utrecht
- Mouth: Nieuwe Maas
  - location: Kinderdijk, South Holland
- Length: 62 km (39 mi)

The Lek (Dutch pronunciation: [lɛk]) is a river in the western Netherlands of some 60 km (37 mi) in length. It is the continuation of the Nederrijn after the Kromme Rijn branches off at the town of Wijk bij Duurstede. The main westbound waterway is hereafter called the Lek River. The Nederrijn is, itself, a distributary branch of the river Rhine.

Portions of the river form the boundary between the provinces of Utrecht and Gelderland, and between Utrecht and South Holland.

In Roman times, the Nederrijn flowed into the Kromme Rijn and these streams were the main outflow of the river Rhine. When the Kromme Rijn began to silt up in the Middle Ages, the Lek became the primary branch. A short distance past Wijk bij Duurstede, the river intersects with the Amsterdam-Rhine Canal, which continues south towards the Waal. A branch of this canal, the Lekkanaal (Lek Canal), is connected to the river in the city of Nieuwegein.

Other major towns on its banks are Culemborg, Vianen, Schoonhoven, Nieuw-Lekkerland, Lekkerkerk, Bergambacht, and Krimpen aan de Lek. The bed of the river lies slightly higher than the surrounding lands and dikes are therefore essential to contain the Lek. At the village of Kinderdijk the Lek meets the Noord River and the combined stream is thereafter known as the Nieuwe Maas as it flows down towards the North Sea.
