= Dordtsche Kil =

River in the Netherlands

Coordinates: 51°45′57″N 4°37′35″E

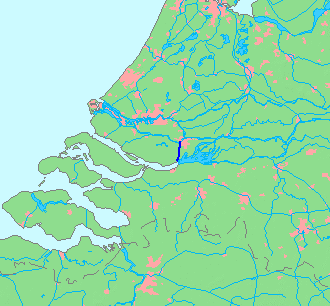

The Dordtse Kil (pre-1947 spelling: Dordtsche Kil) is a short river in South Holland in the Netherlands. The river is tidal and forms the connection between the Oude Maas river and the Hollands Diep. The river is for most part artificial in origin, since it has been a relatively small tidal creek until the 19th century.

== River crossings ==
Connection between Hoeksche Waard island on the west and the Dordrecht island on the east:

- Kiltunnel (toll tunnel)

== See also ==
- Kill (body of water)
