= Boven Merwede =

Stretch of river in the Netherlands

Coordinates: 51°49′42″N 4°56′15″E

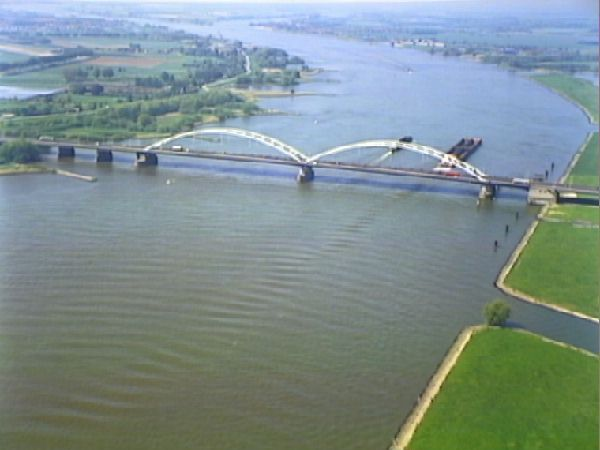
Boven Merwede

The Boven Merwede (Dutch pronunciation: [ˌboːvə ˈmɛrʋeːdə]; "Upper Merwede") is a stretch of river in the Netherlands, mainly fed by the river Rhine. The Afgedamde Maas river joins the Waal at Woudrichem to form the Boven Merwede, which at Hardinxveld-Giessendam splits into the Beneden Merwede river on the right and the Nieuwe Merwede river on the left. Its length is 8.8 km (5.5 mi). The Merwede is part of the main shipping route between Rotterdam and Germany.

A road bridge connects the west side of Gorinchem on the north to the west side of Sleeuwijk on the south.

There are several passenger ferries.
