= Haringvliet =

Inlet of the North Sea

Coordinates: 51°46′18″N 4°12′57″E

Designations

Ramsar Wetland
- Designated: 29 August 2000
- Reference no.: 1244

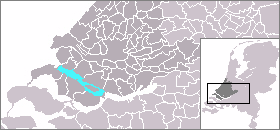
Location of the Haringvliet within South Holland and the Netherlands.

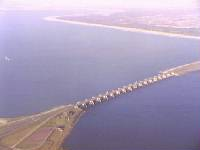
The Haringvliet sluices

The Haringvliet is a large inlet of the North Sea, in the province of South Holland in the Netherlands. It is an important estuary of the Rhine-Meuse delta.

Near Numansdorp, the Hollands Diep splits into the Haringvliet and the Volkerak estuaries. It is closed off near Goedereede from the North Sea by the Haringvlietdam, which provides a road connection between the island of Voorne to the north and the island of Goeree-Overflakkee to the south. The dam with its sluices was built as part of the Delta Works sea barrier protection works.

The Haringvliet estuary contains the island of Tiengemeten, which is separated from the river island of Hoeksche Waard by the Vuile Gat strait.

== History ==
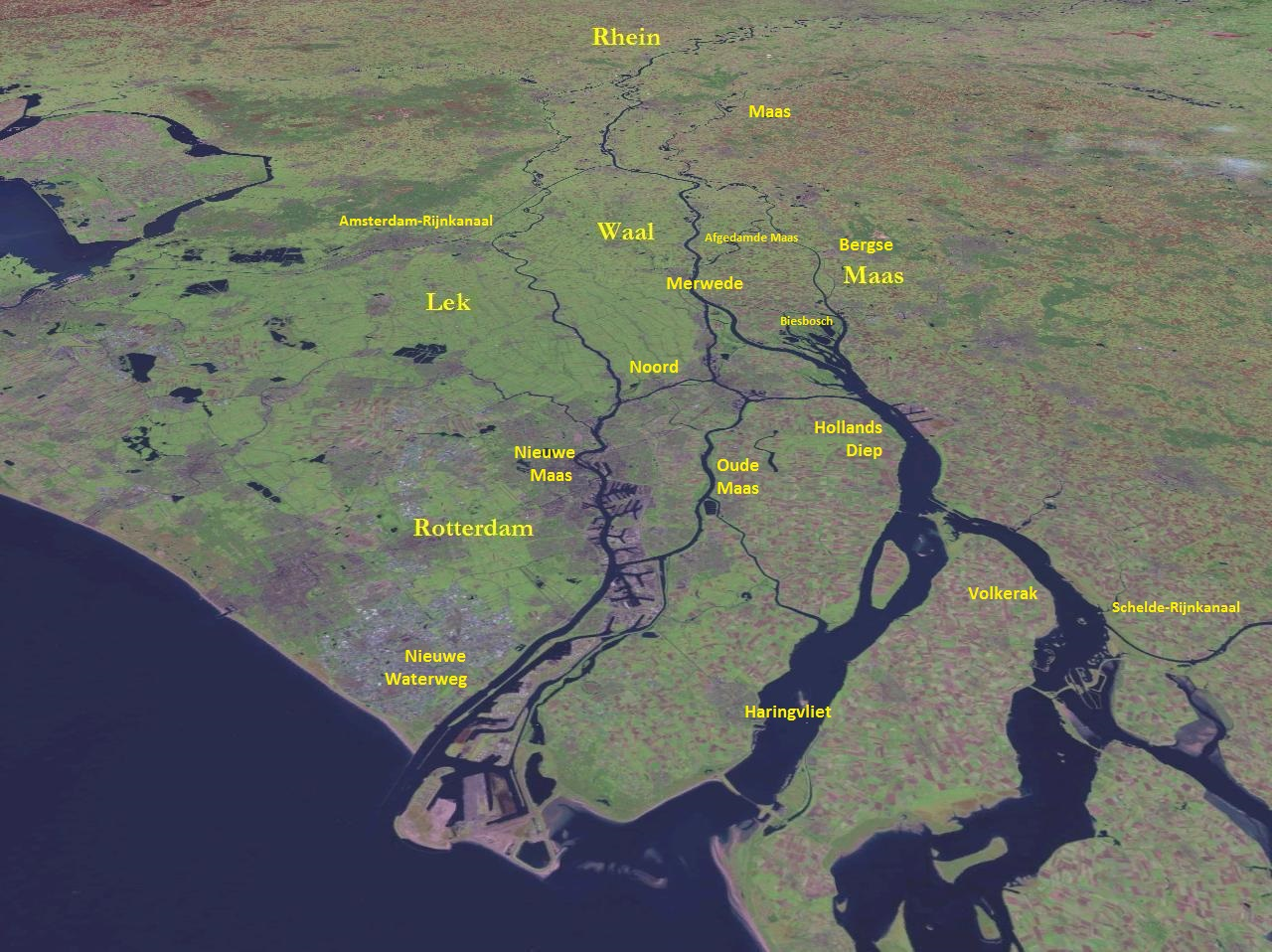
The lower part of the Rhine-Meuse Delta

The Haringvliet was formed as a result of the extensive flooding event of 1216, which breached the dunes of Voorne and created a deep saltwater inlet. During a second flooding event, the St. Elizabeth floods of 1421, this inlet connected to the Merwede and became an important estuary of the Rhine and Meuse rivers.

It used to be ecologically rich, and its brackish waters, fed by both rivers and sea, supported a healthy population of seals. It also provided an access point for migrating fish like salmon and sturgeon. As a result of the North Sea flood of 1953 the Haringvliet was closed off by the Haringvlietdam. The Haringvliet lost its estuarine characteristics and became a freshwater lake. Because of that, the seals are gone and migrating fish can only enter the Rhine-Meuse Delta through the busy and heavy industrialised Nieuwe Waterweg.

There are plans to permanently open a few of the Haringvliet sluices, to partly restore the ecosystem.
