= Beneden Merwede =

Stretch of river in the Netherlands

Coordinates: 51.817°N 4.683°E

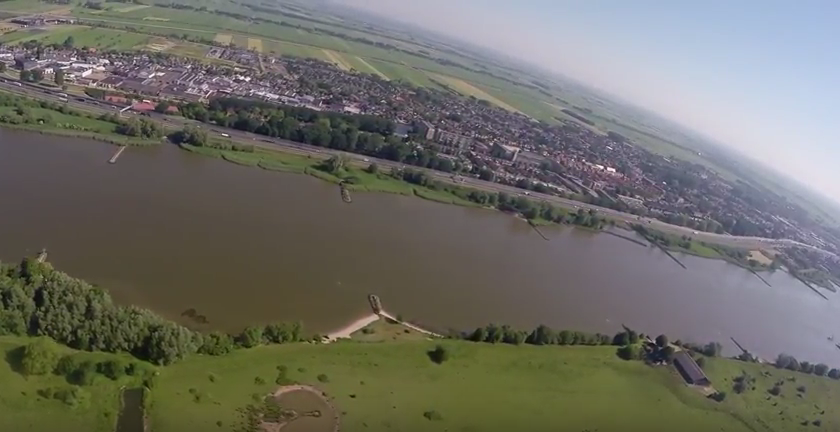
The Beneden Merwede river with the town of Hardinxveld-Giessendam in the background

The Beneden Merwede (Dutch pronunciation: [bəˌneːdə ˈmɛrʋeːdə]; "Lower Merwede") is a stretch of river in the Netherlands, mainly fed by the river Rhine. It starts as the continuation of the Boven Merwede after the branching-off of the Nieuwe Merwede ship canal. It flows from Hardinxveld-Giessendam to Dordrecht, where it splits into the Noord and Oude Maas rivers. Its length is 14.8 km. The river is part of the main shipping route between the port of Rotterdam and the industrial region of the Ruhr, Germany.

There is a road bridge and, more to the east, a railroad bridge between the railway stations Dordrecht Stadspolders and Hardinxveld-Giessendam on the line Dordrecht-Gorinchem.
