= Ship canal =

Canal intended to accommodate ships used on the oceans, seas, or lakes

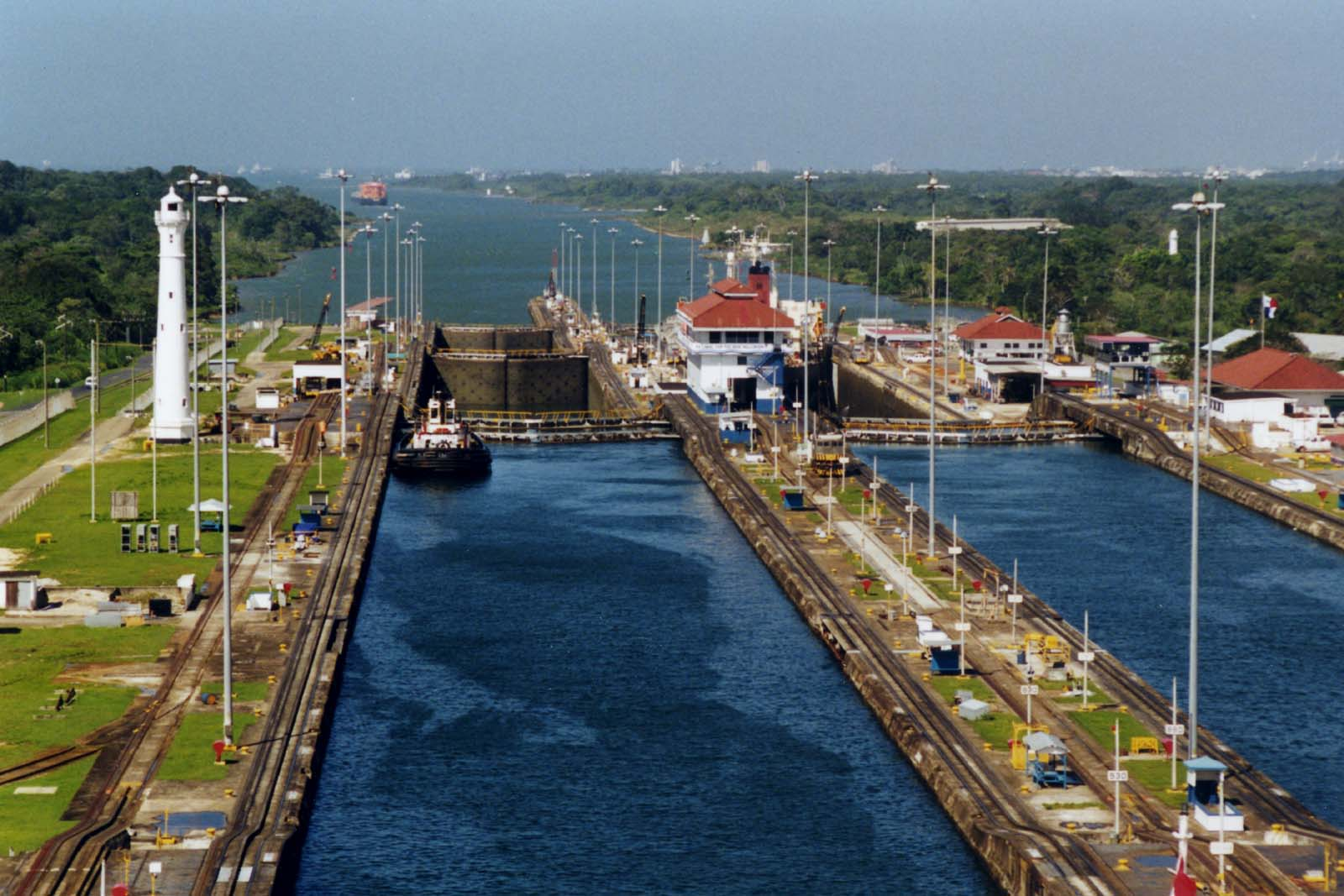
The Panama Canal, a shortcut from the Pacific Ocean to the Caribbean Sea, bypassing a circumnavigation of the Americas

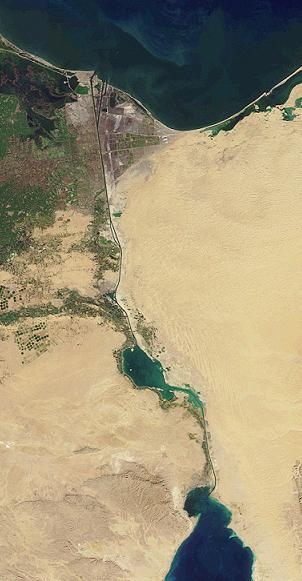
The Suez Canal, a shortcut from the Mediterranean to the Red Sea, bypassing a circumnavigation of Africa

A ship canal is a canal especially intended to accommodate ships used on the oceans, seas, or lakes to which it is connected.

== Definition ==
Ship canals can be distinguished from barge canals, which are intended to carry barges and other vessels specifically designed for river and/or canal navigation. Ships capable of navigating large bodies of open water typically have more draft, and are higher above the water than vessels for inland navigation. A ship canal therefore typically offers deeper water and higher bridge clearances than a barge canal suitable for vessels of similar length and width constraints.

Ship canals may be specially constructed from the start to accommodate ships, or less frequently they may be enlarged barge canals or canalized or channelized rivers. There are no specific minimum dimensions for ship canals, with the size being largely dictated by the size of ships in use nearby at the time of construction or enlargement.

Ship canals may be constructed for a number of reasons, including:

1. To create a shortcut and avoid lengthy detours.
2. To create a navigable shipping link between two land-locked seas or lakes.
3. To provide inland cities with a direct shipping link to the sea.
4. To provide an economical alternative to other options.

== History ==
Early canals were connected with natural rivers, either as short extensions or improvements to them.

One of the first canals built was the Grand Canal of China, which was developed over a long period starting in the 5th century BCE. In the modern era, canals in the United Kingdom are typically associated with the Duke of Bridgewater, who hired the engineer James Brindley and had the first canal (the Bridgewater Canal) built that ran over a flowing river.

In the United States, the canal that brought about an age of canal building was the Erie Canal. It was a long-sought-after canal and connected the Great Lakes to the Hudson River. This canal initiated a half-century-long boom of canal building and brought about many new features that allowed canals to be used in different areas previously inaccessible to canals. These features include locks, which allow a ship to move between different altitudes, and puddling, which waterproofed the canal.

== Notable ship canals ==
Canal name	Year opened	Length	Maximum ship length x beam x draft (m)	Start point	End point
White Sea–Baltic Canal	1933	227 km (141 mi)	135 x 14.3 x 4	Russia: Lake Onega	White Sea in Belomorsk
Rhine–Main–Danube Canal	1992	171 km (106 mi)	190 x 11 x 4	Germany: Main at Bamberg	Danube at Kelheim
Suez Canal	1869	193.3 km (120.1 mi)	Unlimited x 78 x 20	Egypt: Port Said	Port Tewfik
Volga–Don Canal	1952	101 km (63 mi)	141 x 17 x 4	Russia: Volgograd	Tsimlyansk Reservoir
Kiel Canal	1895	98 km (61 mi)	310 x 42 x 14	Germany: Brunsbüttel	Kiel
Houston Ship Channel	1914	80 km (50 mi)	305 x 161 x 14	United States: Houston	Gulf of Mexico
Panama Canal	1914	77 km (48 mi)	366 x 49 x 15	Panama: Caribbean	Pacific Ocean
Danube–Black Sea Canal	1984	64.4 km (40.0 mi)	138 x 17 x 6	Romania: Danube at Cernavodă	Black Sea at Agigea
Manchester Ship Canal	1894	58 km (36 mi)	183 x 20 x 9	United Kingdom: Eastham Locks	Salford Quays
Welland Canal	1932	43.4 km (27.0 mi)	226 x 24 x 8	Canada: Lake Ontario at Port Weller	Lake Erie at Port Colborne
Saint Lawrence Seaway	1959	600 km (370 mi)	226 x 24 x 8	Canada: Port Colborne	Canada: Montreal

== Navigability ==
The standard used in the European Union for classifying the navigability of inland waterways is the European Agreement on Main Inland Waterways of International Importance (AGN) of 1996, adopted by the Inland Transport Committee of the United Nations Economic Commission for Europe (ECE), which defines the following classes:

Class	Tonnage (t)	Draught (m)	Length (m)	Width (m)	Air draught (m)	Description
Class III	1,000					
Class IV	1,000–1,500	2.5	80–85	9.5	5.2–7.0	Johann Welker
Class Va	1,500–3,000	2.5–2.8	95–110	11.4	5.2–7.0–9.1	Large Rhine
Class VIb	6,400–12,000	3.9	140	15	9.1	
Class VII	14,500–27,000	2.5–4.5	275–285	33.0–34.2	9.1	

== See also ==
- Glossary of nautical terms (A–L)
- Glossary of nautical terms (M–Z)
- Great Lakes Waterway
- Lake freighter
- Merchant ship
- Navigability
- Maritime transport
- Watercraft
- Waterway
