= Bergse Maas =

Coordinates: 51°43′N 4°56′E

Bergse Maas / Bergsche Maas
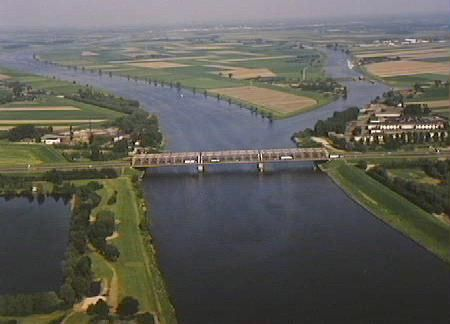
- Keizersveer bridge across the Bergse Maas near Geertruidenberg; to the right, the mouth of the Oude Maasje.

Specifications
- Locks: None
- Maximum height above sea level: 7 ft (2.1 m)
- Status: Open

History
- Former names: Bergsche Maas
- Modern name: Bergse Maas
- Date of first use: 1904
- Date completed: 1904

Geography
- Start point: River Meuse at Heusden
- End point: Amer estuary at Geertruidenberg
- Connects to: River Donge, river Oude Maasje

The Bergsche Maas (Dutch pronunciation: [ˈbɛr(ə)xsə ˈmaːs]; current spelling: Bergsche Maas) is a canal that was constructed in 1904 to be a branch of the river Maas (French: Meuse) in the Dutch province of North Brabant. The Maas splits near Heusden into the Afgedamde Maas and the Bergse Maas. The Afgedamde Maas flows north until its confluence with the river Waal (the main distributary of the river Rhine) to form the Merwede, while the Bergse Maas continues west as the main distributary of the Maas. Part of the Merwede (the Nieuwe Merwede) rejoins the Bergse Maas to form the Hollands Diep estuary.

== History ==
Historically, a natural branch of the Maas flowed from Heusden to the Amer and Hollands Diep estuary; this branch silted up and now forms a stream called Oude Maasje. The Bergse Maas, which takes its name from the town of Geertruidenberg, was constructed in its basin to take over its functions, in 1904. The other main distributary of the Maas was at the same time dammed-up and renamed Afgedamde Maas ("Dammed-up Meuse"). The resulting separation of the rivers Rhine and Maas reduced the risk of flooding and is considered to be the greatest achievement in Dutch hydraulic engineering before the completion of the Zuiderzee Works and Delta Works.

== Transport ==
There are two road bridges and three car ferries. The latter are free of charge for all traffic, as promised to the people living in the area when the Bergse Maas was dug.
