= Hollands Diep =

Estuary of the Rhine and Meuse rivers in South Holland, Netherlands

Coordinates: 51°42′00″N 4°35′02″E

Designations

Ramsar Wetland
- Designated: 29 August 2000
- Reference no.: 1273

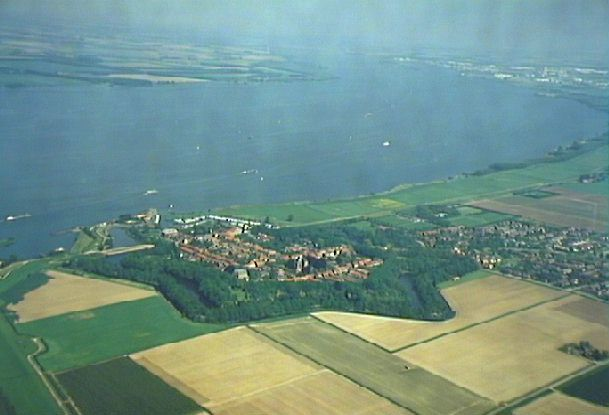
Willemstad and the Hollands Diep

The Hollands Diep (pre-1947 spelling: Hollandsch Diep) is a river in the Netherlands, and an estuary of the Rhine and Meuse rivers. Through the Scheldt–Rhine Canal it connects to the Scheldt river and Antwerp.

The Bergse Maas river and the Nieuwe Merwede river join near Lage Zwaluwe to form the Hollands Diep. The Dordtsche Kil connects to it near Moerdijk. Near Numansdorp it splits into the Haringvliet and the Volkerak.

== History ==
The Hollands Diep was formed as a result of the extensive flood of 1216, which breached the dunes of Voorne and created a deep saltwater inlet (the current Haringvliet). During a second flood, the 1421 St. Elizabeth floods, this inlet connected to the Merwede and became an important estuary of the Rhine and Meuse rivers. From that moment on, the freshwater part of the estuary (east of the Hellegatsplein) was renamed Hollands Diep. The former river Striene, that used to connect the Meuse with the Scheldt, was completely destroyed by these floods and can no longer be recognised on maps.

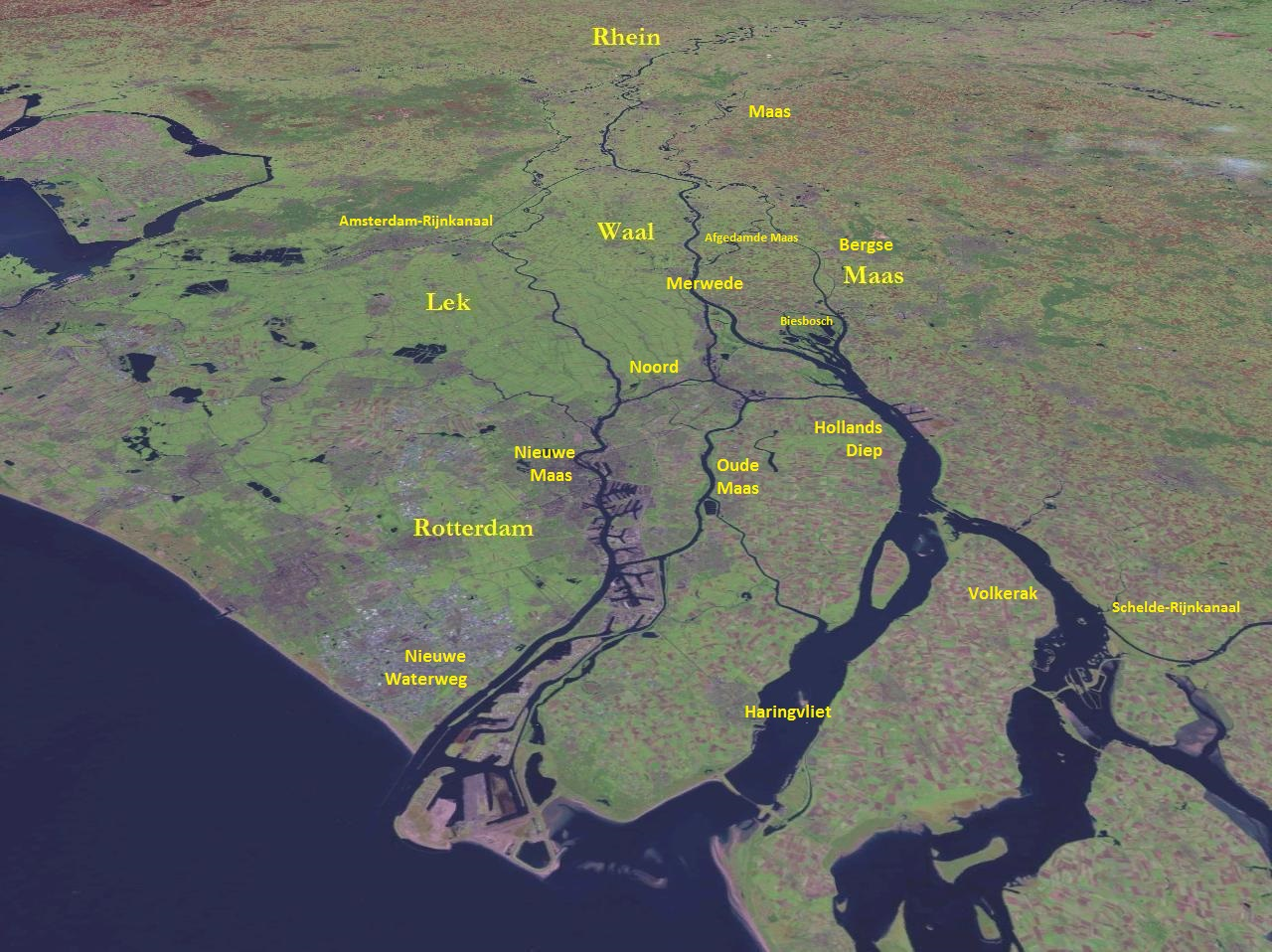
The lower part of the Rhine–Meuse–Scheldt delta

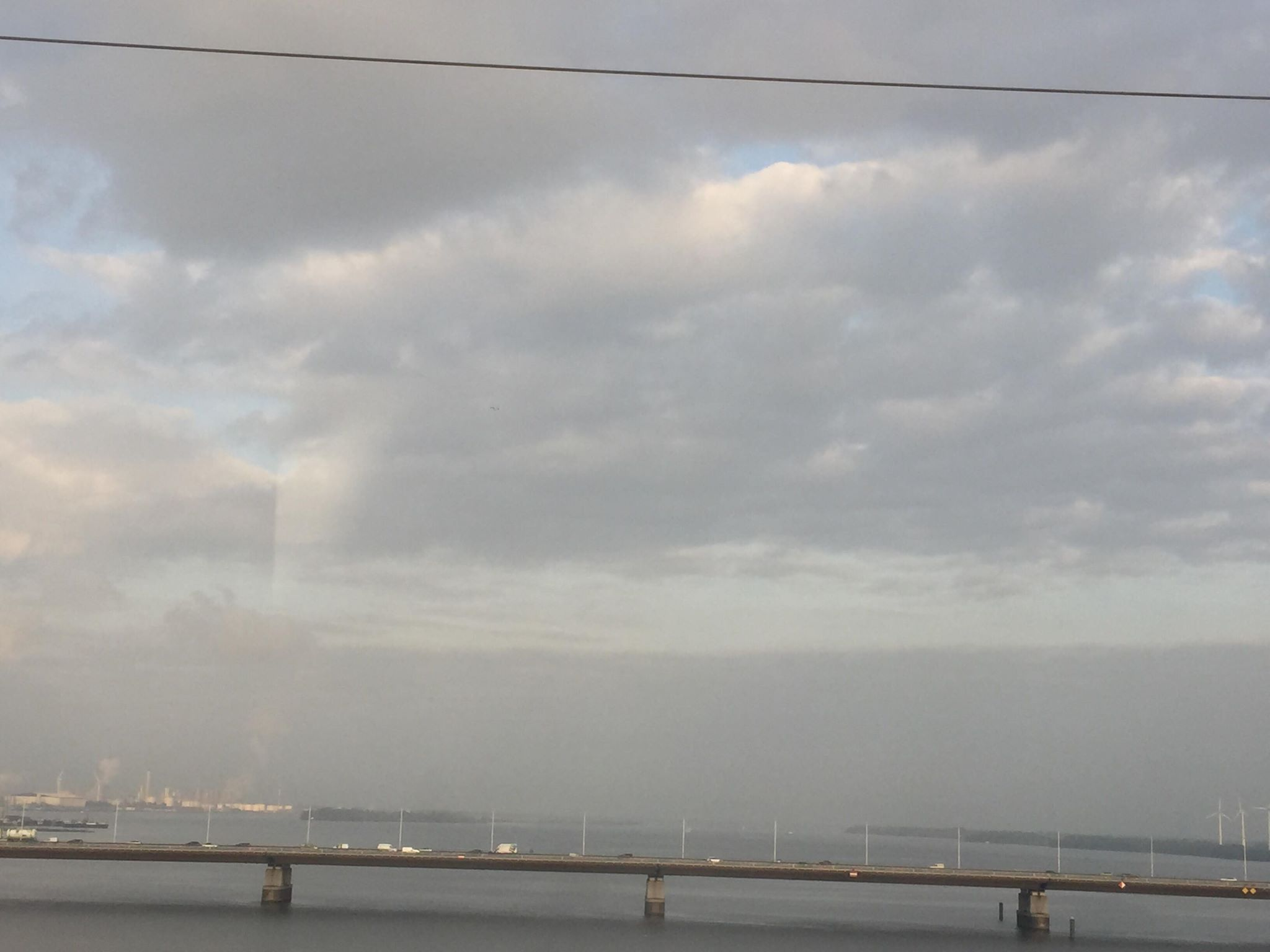
The Hollands Diep near Dordrecht and Tilburg

== River crossings ==
At the point where the Hollands Diep splits, there is a road traffic node on an artificial island (the Hellegatsplein), connecting to the Hoeksche Waard island on the north by the Haringvliet bridge, to the Goeree-Overflakkee on the west by the Hellegatsdam, and to the mainland on the southeast by the Volkerak Sluices.

On the east side of the Hollands Diep the Moerdijk bridges connect the Dordrecht island on the north to the mainland on the south: a road bridge, a railway bridge; a second railway bridge has recently been constructed for the HSL-Zuid.
