= Björn Vlasbom =

Dutch footballer

Personal information
- Full name: Björn Vlasbom
- Date of birth: 28 January 1990 (age 36)
- Place of birth: Dordrecht, Netherlands
- Height: 1.70 m (5 ft 7 in)
- Position: Midfielder

Team information
- Current team: Oranje Wit

Youth career
- Oranje-Wit
- Sparta Rotterdam

Senior career*
Years	Team	Apps	(Gls)
2010–2011	Sparta Rotterdam	2	(0)
2011–	FC Dordrecht	25	(0)
- * Club domestic league appearances and goals as of 4 August 2013 (UTC)

Björn Vlasbom (born 28 January 1990) is a former Dutch professional footballer who played as a midfielder. He formerly played for Sparta Rotterdam and FC Dordrecht.
