= Brielse Maas =

River in the Netherlands

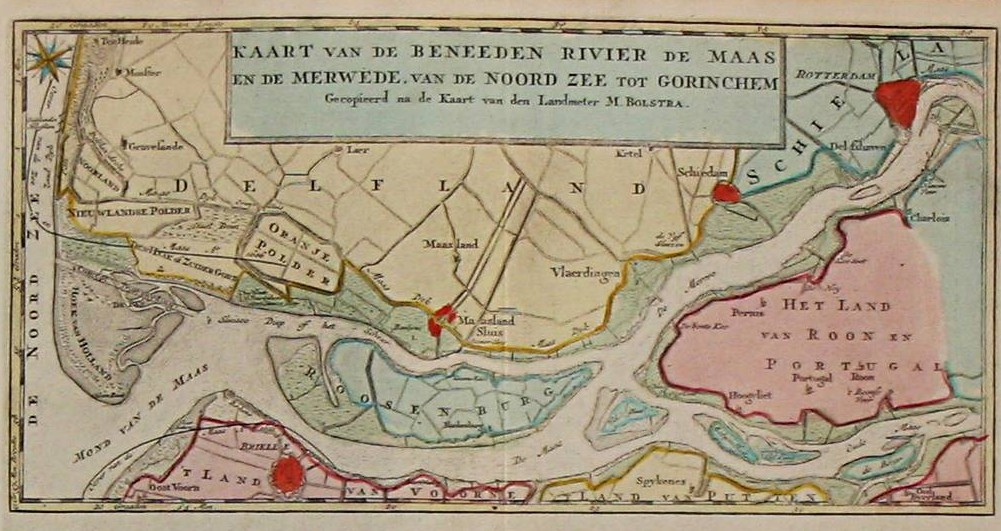
Maas estuary in 1769

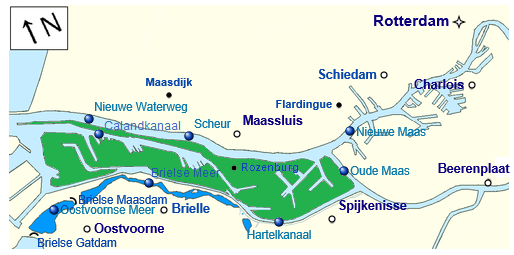
Dark blue are the remnants of the Brielse Maas, the Rozenburg island in green.

The Brielse Maas is a dammed river branch between the North Sea and the Oude Maas in the southern part of the Dutch province of South Holland. The town of Brielle, which gave it its name, is located on the south bank. Originally the Brielse Maas was part of the Nieuwe Maas: at the Vondelingenplaat the Oude Maas and the Nieuwe Maas came together and split into the Brielse Maas and the Scheur. The Brielse Maas was the main shipping channel and mouth of the Rijn-Maas delta.

== History ==
The damming of the Brielse Maas was part of an extensive plan to make the islands of Rozenburg, Voorne-Putten and Welplaat into one water management unit. This was necessary because of the harmful effects of the increased salinization of fresh water. The works also consisted of a dam in the Botlek, a canal through the Hartel area and a system of fencing, drainage and inlet locks.

In 1949, the construction of the Brielse Maasdam near the mouth of the river, was started. The work began over the 900 metres (3,000 ft) wide salt marsh on the south side of the island of Rozenburg. In 1950, the dam was extended into the river channel, itself, with 75 small caissons. Eventually, a sixty-meter wide closing hole remained, which was closed with a Phoenix caisson in July 1950. The dam through the Botlek at the east end of the river was also closed in June 1950 with the help of small caissons.

== Current day ==
The water in between was since then called Brielse Meer and is now a large freshwater basin and recreational area for Rijnmond and the surrounding area. The lake is connected to the Oude Maas via locks at Spijkenisse via the Shipping and Feeding Canal (Dutch: Scheepvaart- en Voedingskanaal). Freshwater from the Spui can be let in via the Bernisse. It is also connected to the Haringvliet via the Voorne Canal.
