= Voorne Canal =

First canal to connect Rotterdam, in the Netherlands, to the sea

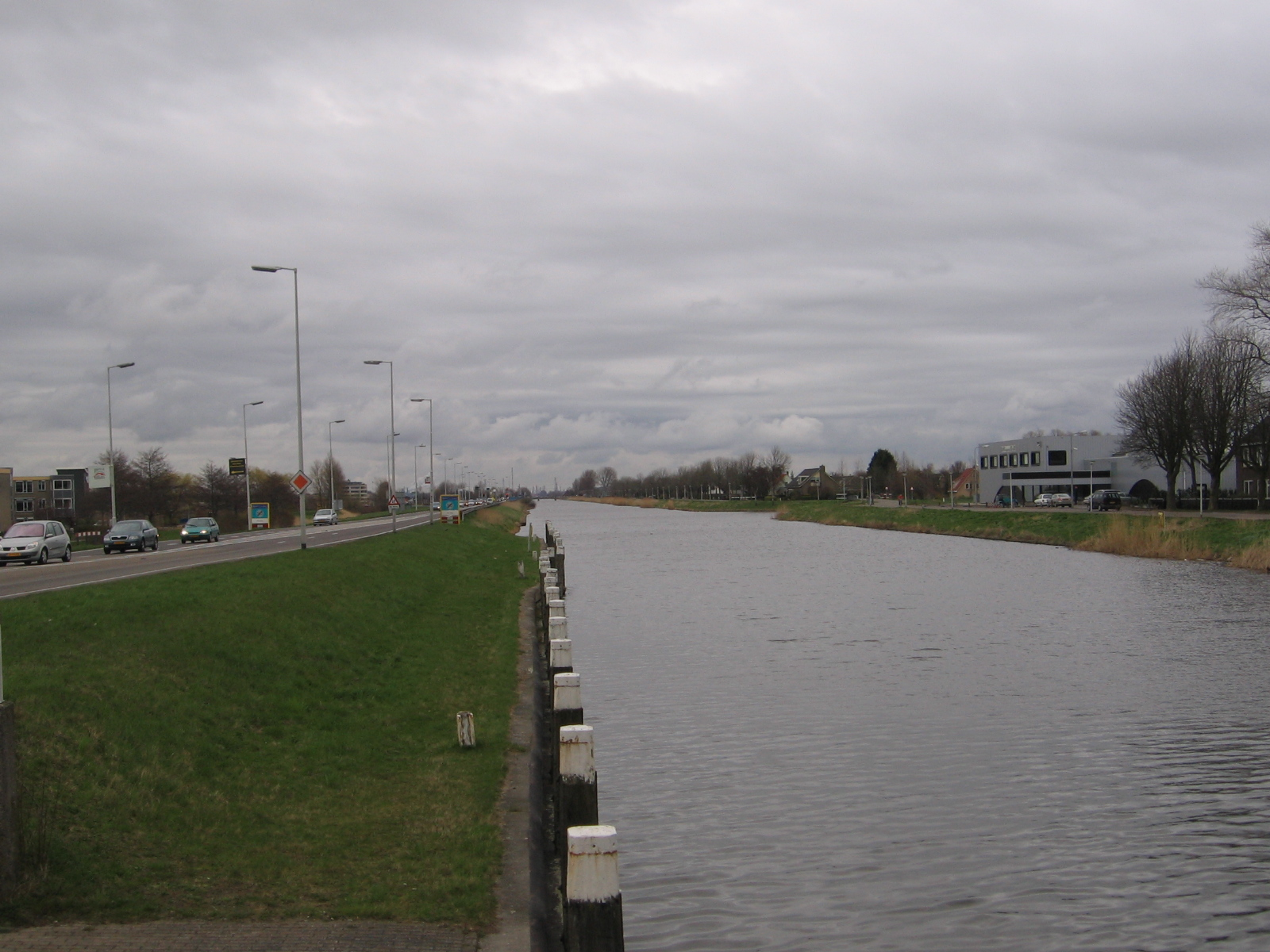
- The Voorne Canal in Hellevoetsluis in 2006

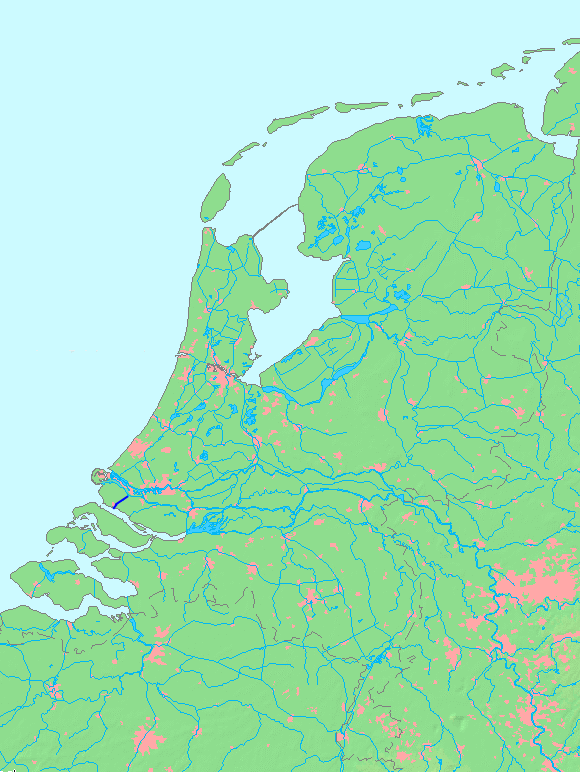
- Interactive map of Voorne Canal

Specifications
- Length: 9.08 km (5.64 miles) (originally 10.55 km or 6.56 mi)
- Maximum boat length: 110.0
- Maximum boat beam: 13.78 m (45 ft 3 in)
- Locks: 1 (originally 2)

History
- Date completed: 1829
- Date closed: 1966 (partial)

Geography
- Start point: Hellevoetsluis (originally Nieuwesluis)
- End point: Near Heenvliet (originally Hellevoetsluis)
- Beginning coordinates: 51.876833°N 4.248190°E (former)
- Ending coordinates: 51.822924°N 4.133490°E (current begin)

The Voorne Canal (Also "Canal through Voorne", In Dutch: Kanaal door Voorne or Voornse kanaal) is a former ship canal on Voorne-Putten in South Holland, the Netherlands. It was the first canal to connect Rotterdam to the sea. Construction of the canal started in 1826 and was completed in 1829. Until the completion of the Nieuwe Waterweg in 1872 it was the main connection from Rotterdam to the sea for ocean going ships.

== Characteristics ==
The path of the canal traverses Voorne, with one end at the eastern harbor of Hellevoetsluis and the other near Heenvliet. It starts at a point just west of Heenvliet on the north coast of the island. About 200 m south of this point, it has been dammed of. The dam has culverts to enable the Brielse Meer to discharge to the south. The hamlet Nieuwesluis and the northern lock have been demolished and have disappeared below what is now the southern bank of the Seinehaven. North of where it is dammed off, a small section is still accessible from the Voedingskanaal Brielse Meer. This section is used as a marina.

The current Voorne Canal ends at a point just east of the Fortress of Hellevoetsluis on the south coast of Voorne-Putten. At this end, the harbor and lock of the canal remain operational. Here another big marina stretches out into the canal. About 1.5 km north of the lock, part of a shopping center has been built over the canal. This effectively closes down the section between the shopping center and the dam for all but the lowest recreational boats.

Today, the canal is a favorite spot of anglers, and is a famous place to catch big common breams. The canal has facilities for kayaking.

=== Name ===
The name of the canal has changed over time. In the 1850s, there was a slight preference for the Kanaal van Voorne over Kanaal door Voorne. The people next preferred Voornche Kanaal, and the current preferred name is Kanaal door Voorne. In English the canal is generally called Voorne Canal, and less often Canal through Voorne.

== History ==
=== Context ===
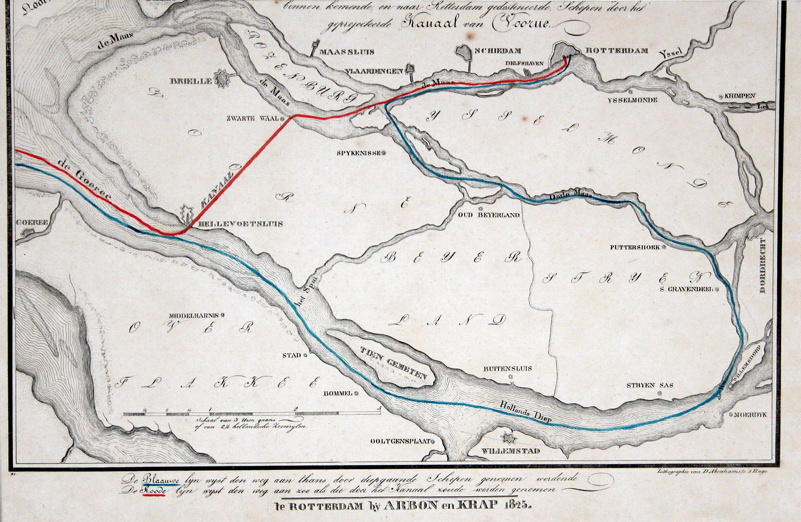
The canal in red and the existing ship route in blue

In the middle of the eighteenth century, the Nieuwe Maas, the main connection between Rotterdam and the sea, began to silt up. By the early nineteenth century, there were multiple waterways from Rotterdam to the sea:

- A short shallow route from Rotterdam past Maassluis over the Nieuwe Maas and Het Scheur
- A short shallow route from Rotterdam past Brielle over the Nieuwe Maas and Brielse Maas
- A relatively short, but shallow route from Rotterdam over the Nieuwe Maas and Oude Maas to Oud-Beijerland, and then through the Spui and Haringvliet to the sea.
- A relatively short, but shallow route from Rotterdam eastwards over the Nieuwe Maas, then over the Noord to Dordrecht and then to the Hollands Diep, and to the sea either via the Haringvliet or the Grevelingen
- The longest route, i.e. from Rotterdam over the Nieuwe Maas and Oude Maas to the Dordtse Kil near Dordrecht, and then as the previous

As the short routes silted up, they remained suitable only for ships that had a draft of somewhat over 3 m. In general, this forced ocean-going ships to take the longest route, i.e. the huge detour over the Haringvliet, Hollands Diep, Dordtsche Kil and Oude Maas to reach the last stretch of the Nieuwe Maas before Rotterdam. It meant that for ships, Dordrecht was closer to the sea than Rotterdam.

The consequences of the situation were bad. The detours over Dordrecht not only made the road to sea about three times as long, it also required different winds and multiple tides to sail the zigzag route, which led to even more delay. Even on the long route, ships with a draft of slightly over 20 feet could not be brought before the city without transloading part of the cargo. A further complication was that it often forced ships to sail the Haringvliet under dangerous conditions.

The transloading process was very costly. Its necessity was specifically related to some shallow parts on the long route. These were later mentioned as: De Beer, De Lint, De Krap, and the Vissersgat. These made that ships had to transload at 's-Gravendeel, or even outside the Dordtsche Kil on the Hollands Diep. Most of the big ships that American shipping lines used were even completely loaded and unloaded at 's-Gravendeel.

=== Construction ===
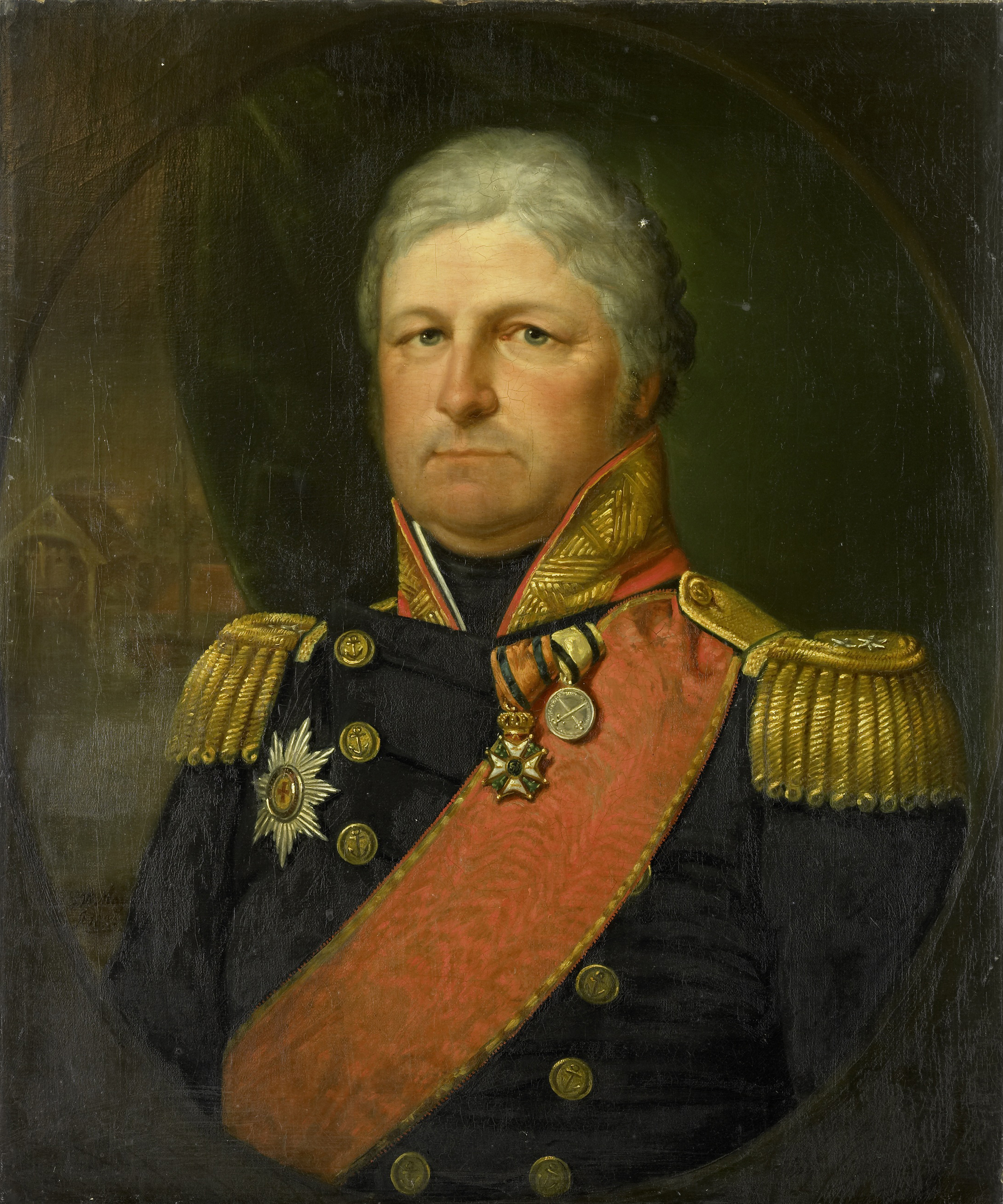
Job Seaburne May

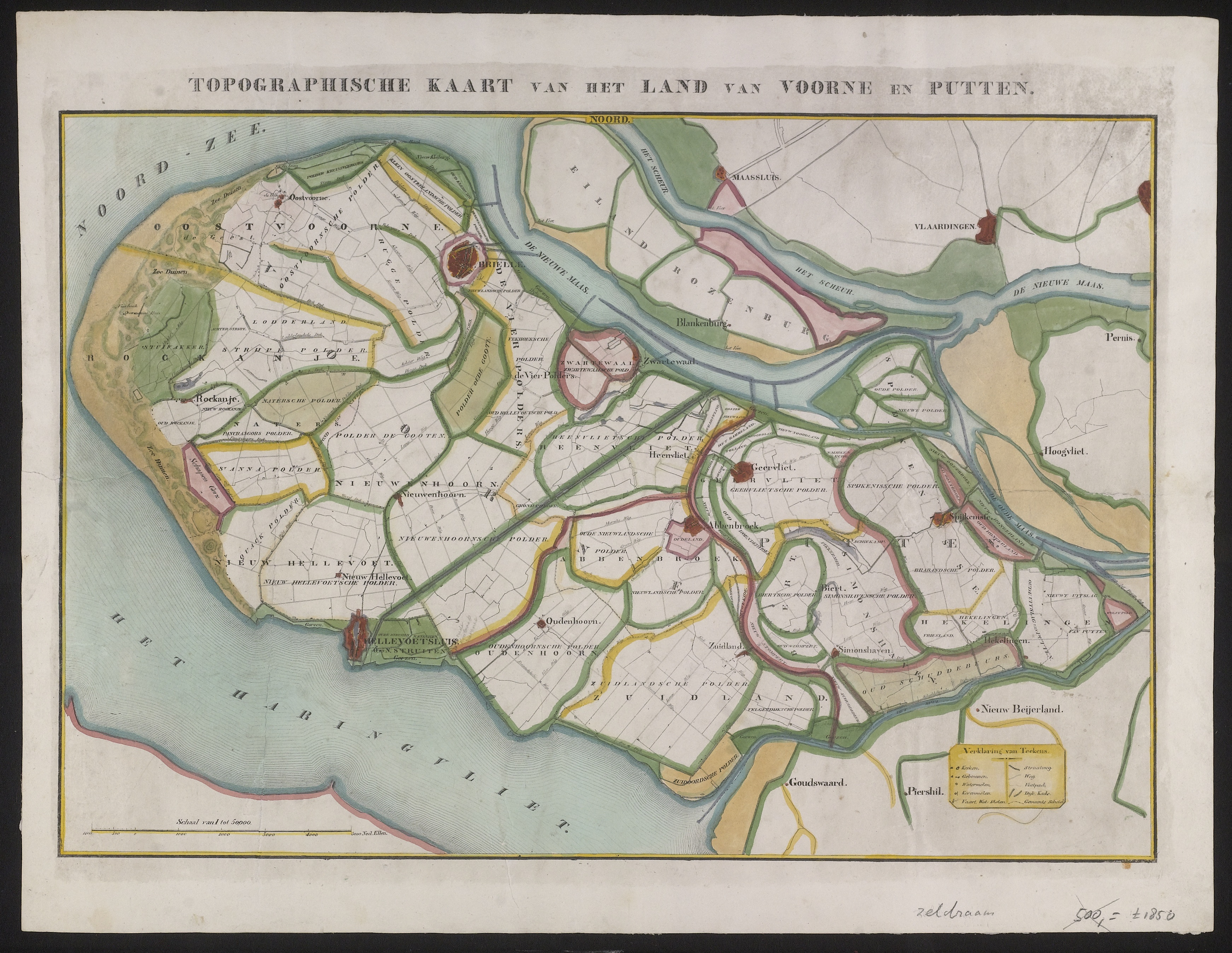
An 1850 map that shows the relation to old landmarks

The first plans for a ship canal through Voorne dated from the early 17th century. Such a canal would grant easier access to Rotterdam, but could also provide a secure connection between the naval base at Hellevoetsluis and the admiralty shipyard in Rotterdam. The final plan that was conceived by Job Seaburne May. In 1815 he became commander of the Naval department of the Meuse, and its base, the Rijkswerf Rotterdam. As such he had a professional interest to create the canal. In his original design, the canal would end at the wet dock of Hellevoetluis, and be wide enough to allow ships of the line to retreat inland to Rotterdam.

Already in 1823 it was known that the canal would start at the Nieuwe Haven of Hellevoetsluis, i.e. just east of the fortress. It signaled that the commercial interest prevailed over the military interest, even though the latter was still served by the canal. According to the plan, the Nieuwe Haven would be slightly realigned to the east. It is now the Koopvaardijhaven. On 18 March 1826 the plan to dig a canal from the Nieuwe Haven at Hellevoetsluis till the Nieuwe Sluis (literally the new lock, the later hamlet Nieuwesluis) in the Nieuwe Maas was approved by the king.

The orders for the construction of the canal were given over a couple of years. The construction of the canal itself was tendered in 6 parts on 7 April 1827. Construction of the locks was tendered on 3 May. On 5 July, the second part of the construction of the canal had to be tendered again. On 6 September construction of the harbors on the seaside of the locks was tendered. Construction of the raft bridges across the canal was tendered much later, i.e. in August 1828, and was repeated on 18 September. In June 1829 the construction of a brick watermill and several other drainage facilities for the surrounding polders was tendered. This had to be repeated on 23 July. On 8 October 1829, the construction of dolphins and pile moorings in the canal was tendered. This had to be repeated on 19 November. Finally, on 28 October 1830 delivery of the sand required for the tow paths was tendered.

The Voorne Canal was dug from 1827 to 1829. It started at Nieuwesluis, a since disappeared hamlet just north of Heenvliet, see 1850 map. From there it went to the southwest, and ended just east of Hellevoetsluis. On 8 November 1830 the canal was opened for shipping. In May 1831 the regulations for the canal were published.

=== Cost ===
The cost of the Voorne Canal was 132,800 GBP. At the time, this amounted to about 1,600,000 guilders. The relatively small scale of the project is shown by comparing this to the estimated cost of the North Sea Canal, which was 27,630,000 guilders. A Dutch florin (Dutch: gulden or guilder) at the time was equivalent in value to "nearly 40/100 gold dollars" (US), so nearly 0.657 grams of gold.

=== Early use ===
Vessels passing through the Canal
Year	Ships	Incoming	Outgoing	Boats
1830	183			116
1831	1,622			924
1832	1,937			
1833	1,736			
1834	2,024	1,285	766	
1835	1,804	1,129	675	
1836	2,015	1,214	801	
1837	2,172	1,284	888	
1838	2,459	1,353	1,106	
1839	2,800	1,604	1,196	1,441
1840	2,490	1,398	1,092	
1841	2,372	1,340	1,032	
1842	2,360	1,408	952	
1843	2,568	1,540	1,028	
1844	2,502	1,350	1,152	
1845	2,428	1,441	977	
1846	2,836	1,736	1,100	
1847	3,068	1,764	1,294	
1848	2,292	1,276	1,016	
1849	2,650	1,417	1,233	

The canal was an immediate success, not in the least because of the Belgian Revolution which had started in August 1830. This diverted a lot of maritime traffic from Antwerp to Rotterdam, especially that to the Dutch overseas colonies. In the first 6 weeks after the opening over 200 ships used it. In the first months of 1831 over 500 ships used it, some of them fully loaded with a draft of 15–17 feet. On 1 May the frigate Le Heros Captain B.C. ten Ham arrived in Hellevoetsluis from Batavia, and succeeded in reaching Rotterdam before the news of her arrival at Hellevoetsluis had reached the city. In October 1831 the use of the canal for the navy was demonstrated. At 11:30 am the war frigate Ceres left the Rijkswerf Rotterdam, towed by the royal steamyacht De Leeuw, and was in the Nieuwesluis lock at 4:30 pm. On the morrow, favorable circumstances allowed 18 horses to draw Ceres through the canal in two hours.

The table shows some figures about traffic on the canal. These have to be carefully interpreted. Loaded ships would come in over the canal, and use the Nieuwe Maas on the return trip, because they were not loaded. This is a phenomenon also observed on the Noordhollandsch Kanaal. The climate also played a big role, with waters often being closed by ice for months. From 1832 to 1836 these numbers show no significant growth. The year 1833 was very bad due to the blockade of the Dutch coast by the French and English navies. The first year that shows a significant lasting growth is 1837. It was followed by a few years of very rapid growth. However, the main benefit of the canal was the huge cost reduction that it brought. It led to an initiative to commemorate Job Seaburne May.

=== Characteristics in 1833 ===
In 1833 the canal was described as running from Nieuwesluis to Hellevoetsluis, where it exited just east of Hellevoetsluis on the roadstead of Hellevoetsluis. Both locks were 14 m wide, and had a double set of gates, meaning that they could lift ships in both directions. At the locks were draw bridges. On the canal there were raft bridges (vlotbrug) at Nieuwen-Hoornschen Dijk, Ravensche weg and Wilweg. Ships of almost 6 m draft could use it, and the canal was 34 m wide when the canal level was low. Both sides had double tow paths, a sanded one for horses and somewhat lower, a path for humans. Four sluices served the surrounding polders. The locks could be used to increase the canal level to almost 7 m if necessary. The locks also had facilities to function as sluices. This gave the canal operators the ability to flush the canal, keeping it up to depth.

=== The Goereesche Gat before Hellevoetsluis ===
While the Voorne Canal was built for and suitable for sailing ships of the time, it did not realize its full potential. The main reason was that the access from the sea to Hellevoetsluis was via the Goereesche Gat, a natural trench in the sea bottom. In 1780 scientists noted that this canal was steadily deteriorating. By 1858, the normal high water level of the Goereesche Gat was only 5.7 m and required an experienced pilot to cross it. Meanwhile, the draft of ships was ever increasing.

To the south of the sea arm that gave access to Hellevoetsluis, was the island of Goeree or Westvoorne, with the village Goedereede. South of this island was the natural canal Brouwershavensche Gat, with a depth of 11.80 m at high tide. These circumstances caused that by 1848 many ocean going ships first went to Brouwershaven to transload part of their cargo. They then went back to sea to access the Voorne Canal via the Goereesche Gat. After 1855, the Hellegat (east of Ooltgensplaat) of 5.2 m high tide depth became usable again, and the majority of ships took the inside route.

In 1836 the condition of the Goereesche Gat led to a plan for a canal through Goedereede. It would be a prolongation of the Voorne Canal, giving access to the Brouwershavensche Gat. This plan came to nothing because there were severe doubts about whether it was possible to give enough depth to the section between the two canals.

=== The Nieuwe Waterweg is built ===
Vessels passing through the Canal
Year	Ships	Incoming	Outgoing	Boats
1870	5,640			
1872	6,072			
1876				
1877	1,183	1,027	156	2,327
1878	1,311	1,150	161	2,675
1879	1,040	925	115	2,261
1880	1,222	1,042	180	4,255
1881	1,487	1,206	281	5,199
1882	1,077	896	181	3,867
1883	375	305	70	1,560
1884	346	291	55	
1885	57			1,620
1886	36	20	16	1.690

In 1857 the Ministry of the Interior appointed a commission to advise about improving the access from Rotterdam to the sea. It had to judge several plans. One of these was the 1858 plan for the Nieuwe Waterweg. It also had to advise about whether something should be done about the Voorne Canal, and possibly a canal through Goeree.

The commission noted that in 1855 the desired dimensions for the North Sea Canal had been based on a ship of 100 by 15 m with a draft of 6.5 m. This was one of the reasons why the commission strongly advised for the 1858 plan for the Nieuwe Waterweg. However, it also noted that after completion, it would take 6–8 years for the Nieuwe Waterweg to become deep enough. The commission therefore also advised to immediately lengthen the lock chambers of the Voorne Canal by adding a third pair of gates to each lock.

On 23 January 1863 the law to construct the North Sea Canal and the Nieuwe Waterweg was approved. The Nieuwe Waterweg was started in 1866, and opened in 1872, but it would take far longer than expected for it to get the intended depth.

Meanwhile the 1857 advice to immediately improve the locks of the Voorne Canal had not been heeded, and this turned out badly. Of course the somewhat shallower ships quickly went to use the Nieuwe Waterweg as soon as it became suitable for them. For the really big ships however, a sufficient draft failed to materialize in the Nieuwe Waterweg. In 1879 the canal authorities started to let ships pass the locks with open gates, so larger ships could pass. Of course this could only be done when the tide led to an equal water level at both sides of the lock. It also led to infusion of salt water, and was somewhat dangerous. In 1883 further improvements to the Nieuwe Waterweg again led to a reduction of traffic on the canal. In 1885 traffic on the canal became insignificant.

=== Characteristics in 1880 ===
In about 1880 the canal was described as having a total length of 10.6 km, and being closed by a lock at both ends. The minimum width was 37 m at the canal level, and 11 m at the bottom. The minimal depth was 6.10 m below NAP, while the canal level varied between 0.30 m above NAP and 0.70 m below NAP. The sides of the canal had an inclination well below 2:1 (27 degrees). Both banks had a 4 m wide tow path at 0.42 m above NAP. Above these were the canal dikes, which reached till 2.20-2.75 m above the normal canal level. Along the canal there were four 90 m long basins with a bottom width of 41 m.

Both locks had an equivalent lock chamber with a useful length of 70.71 m and an opening of 13.78 m wide. The sills were at 6.10 m below NAP. However, if the tide was at a level that was equal to that on the inside of a lock, ships with a length of up to 110 m could pass. The lock on the Hellevoetsluis also served to prevent the introduction of salt water into the polders. The use of the Nieuwesluis lock prevented saltier water from the canal from entering the Nieuwe Maas.

=== Backwater Hellevoetsluis ===
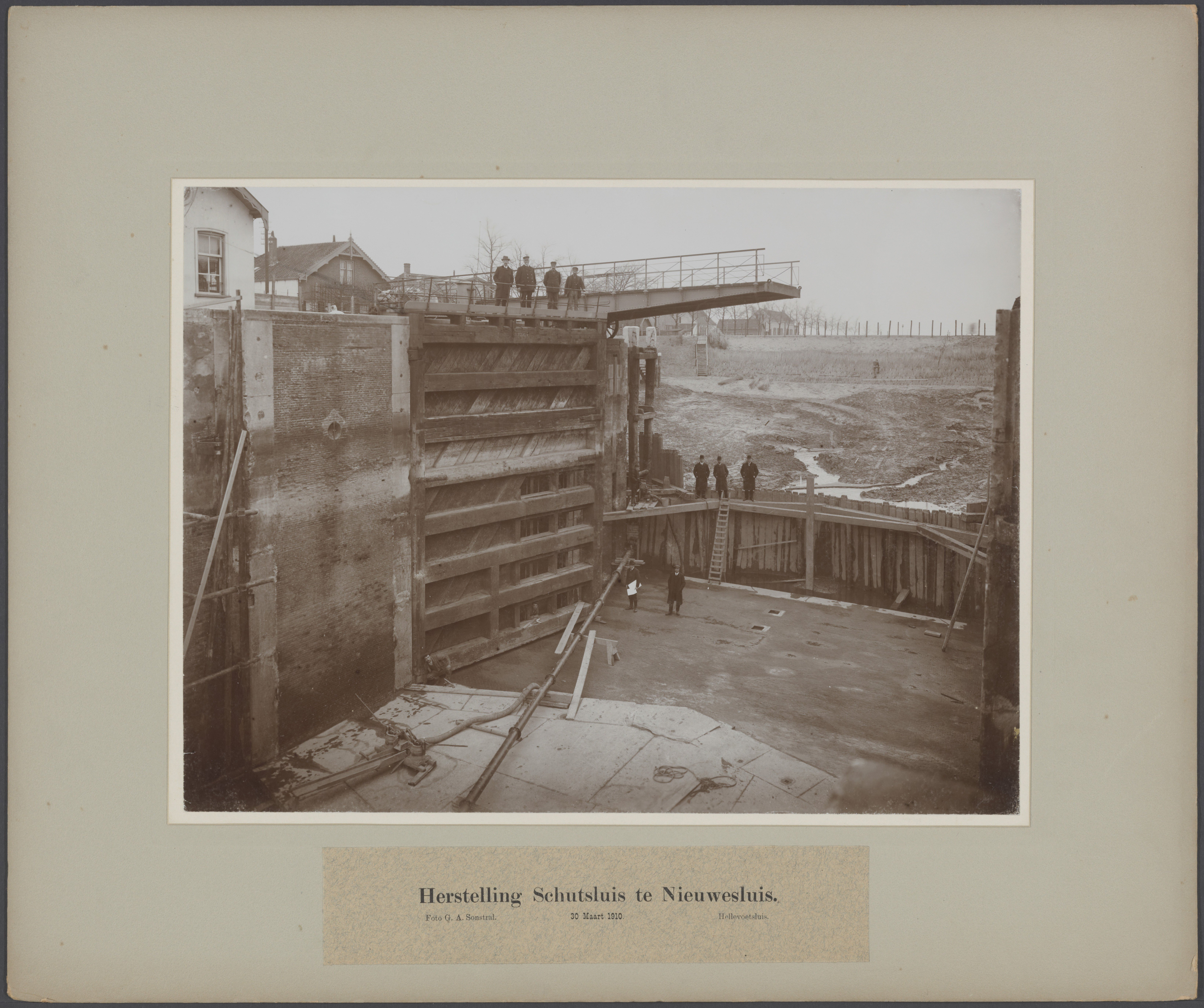
Renovation of Nieuwesluis Lock in 1910

The almost total elimination of shipping on the canal by the final success of the Nieuwe Waterweg in about 1883 was of course disastrous for Hellevoetsluis. What remained was the naval base with its monitors, which often lay in the canal on the seaside of the lock. Some inland shipping also remained. By the early 1890s this amounted to about 4,000 vessels for inland navigation. Amongst these were multiple inland shipping lines to Zeeland, which had very few railways.

For the above reasons, the canal was not abandoned after it lost its use for ocean-going shipping. Another probable reason is that it was an insurance policy if the Nieuwe Waterweg failed for any reason. In 1910 the lock of Nieuwesluis was renovated.

=== Characteristics in 1965 ===
Before the 1966 closure, the canal had a normal level between NAP and 0.50 m below NAP, with a maximum of 0.10 m above NAP. The water that the polders discharged on the canal, was regularly discharged in southern direction by the sluice function of the Hellevoetsluis lock, which could function as such at ebb. If a storm pushed up the sea at Hellevoetsluis, the excess water of the polders would be discharged through the Nieuwesluis lock. However, this was undesirable, because the canal water contained more salt than the Brielse Maas. Therefore the Nieuwesluis lock often discharged southward to lower the salt level in the canal. The closure of the Haringvliet in 1970 meant that the sluice function of the Hellevoetsluis lock had to be replaced with a pumping station.

=== Closure ===
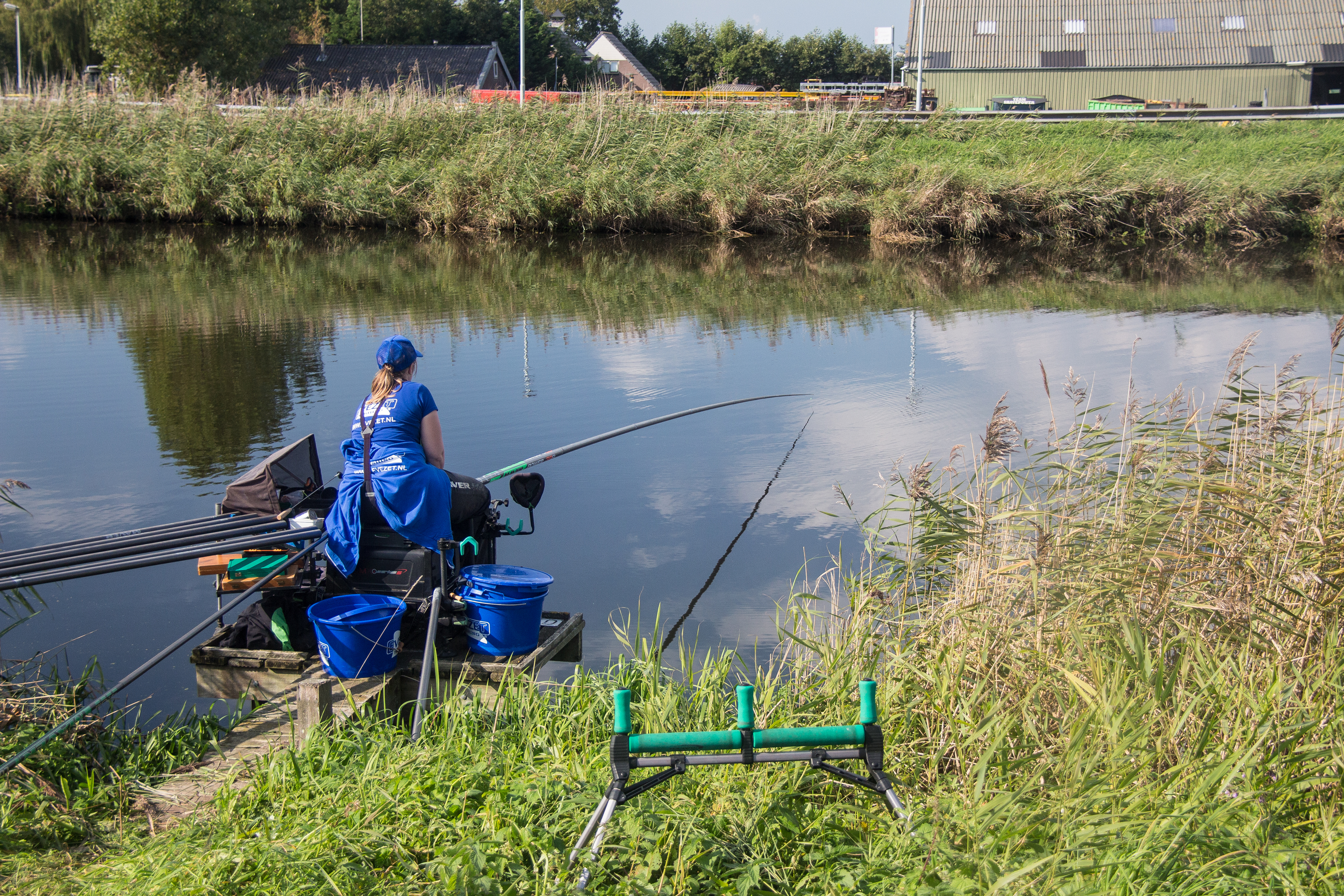
Woman fishing at the canal

In June 1950 the first version of the Hartel Canal was opened. It ran from the Oude Maas just north of Spijkenisse to a point just east of Nieuwesluis. By 1959 there were new plans that proposed a more southern route of the Hartel Canal. These included the elimination of Nieuwesluis and Blankenburg. The municipality of Heenvliet objected to the plans. In June 1961, the government decided the matter. The Hartel Canal would get a new location south of Nieuwesluis. The manor D'Oliphant, which stood near the hamlet was rebuilt in Rotterdam.

The agricultural lobby now seized the opportunity, and proposed to construct a dam in the canal south of the Hartel Canal. This would make it possible to decrease the water level in the canal by about three meters. The result would be a ground water level more favorable for agriculture, and less infusion of salt water. It would also allow the replacement of up to 8 water mills that discharged on the canal by a single big, but cheaper water mill that pumped the canal water to the Haringvliet. In 1965 the Ministry of Infrastructure and Water Management decided to close down the Voorne Canal. It was hardly used anymore, but would cost a lot to maintain. In 1966 a dam was laid across the canal northwest of Heenvliet and south of Nieuwesluis and its lock. The lock was subsequently demolished.

=== After closure ===
After World War II, the old fortress town Helvoet first expanded to the north in the direction of Nieuw-Helvoet. In 1965-1967 a new plan for Hellevoetsluis projected a new town center at the hamlet Oostdijk. There were plans to close the canal south of it, and replace it with a new discharge canal, but in the end the southern part of the canal was preserved.
