= Blankenburg =

Blankenburg may refer to:

== Places ==
- Blankenburg am Harz, a German town in the district of Harz, Saxony-Anhalt
- Blankenburg Castle (Harz), the castle in Blankenburg am Harz (see above)
- Bad Blankenburg, a German town in the Saalfeld-Rudolstadt district of Thuringia
- Blankenburg, Unstrut-Hainich-Kreis, a German municipality in the Unstrut Hainich district of Thuringia
- Blankenburg (Berlin), an area in the borough of Pankow in Berlin
- County of Blankenburg, a former state of the Holy Roman Empire
- Blankenburg (Verwaltungsgemeinschaft)
- Blankenburg (Rozenburg), a former Dutch village near Rozenburg

== Other uses ==
- Blankenburg (surname)

== See also ==
- Blankenberg (disambiguation)
- Blankenberge, Belgian town
