= Rozenburg =

Town in South Holland province of the Netherlands

- Borough
- Flag Coat of arms

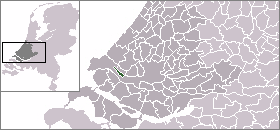
- Coordinates: 51.90°N 4.25°E
- Country: Netherlands
- Province: South Holland
- Municipality: Rotterdam

Area (2006)
  - Total: 6.50 km^{2} (2.51 sq mi)
  - Land: 4.51 km^{2} (1.74 sq mi)
  - Water: 1.98 km^{2} (0.76 sq mi)

Population (1 January 2007)
  - Total: 12,672
  - Density: 2,810/km^{2} (7,300/sq mi)
- Source: CBS, Statline.
- Time zone: UTC+1 (CET)
  - Summer (DST): UTC+2 (CEST)
- Website: www.rotterdam.nl/rozenburg

Rozenburg (Dutch pronunciation: [ˈroːzə(m)bʏr(ə)x]) is a town and former municipality in the western Netherlands, in the province of South Holland. The municipality had a population of 13,173 in 2004, and covers an area of 6.50 km^{2} (of which 1.99 km^{2} water). It was the second-smallest municipality in the Netherlands in area (behind Bennebroek). On 10 July 2008, the local council decided to disband the municipality and to form a submunicipality of Rotterdam. This was ratified on 27 October 2009 by the Eerste Kamer (the Dutch Senate), and came into effect on 18 March 2010.

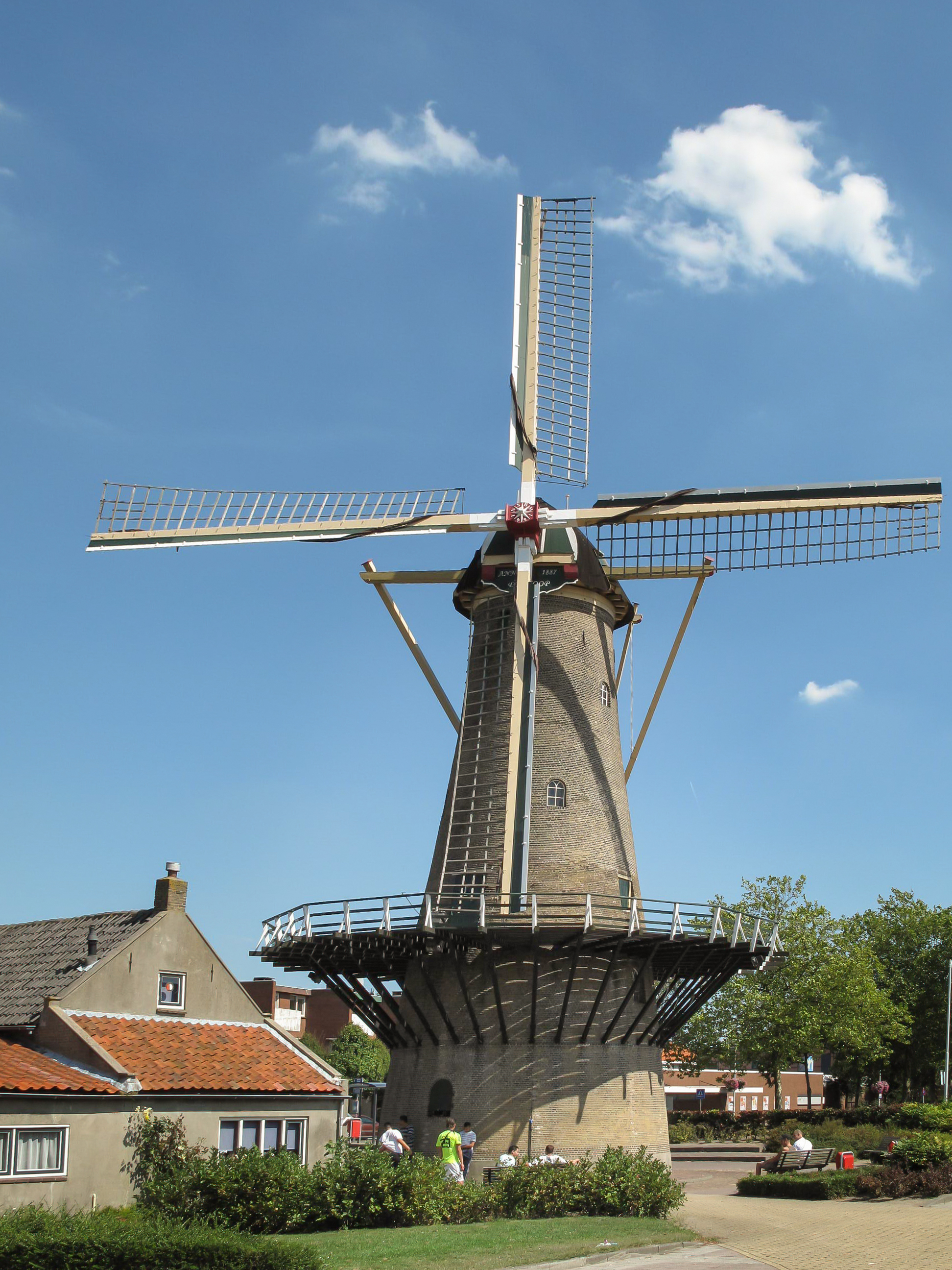
Windmill de Hoop

The town is located on the former island by the same name: Rozenburg Island. Its current form was created out of three separate parts: Rozenburg proper (a former sand bar between Het Scheur and Brielse Maas – part of the Nieuwe Maas river – both being branches of the Rhine–Meuse–Scheldt delta), the sand bar Welplaat, and the southernmost part of the Hook of Holland (which was cut off from mainland Holland by the construction of the Nieuwe Waterweg ship canal in 1870 and subsequently was connected to Rozenburg when the remainder of Het Scheur was dammed off). The island is now connected to Voorne-Putten by a sea barrier and a dam.

== History ==
Rozenburg Island was formed centuries ago from several sand bars in the mouth of the river Maas. In 1568 construction started on the first set of dikes and in 1586 the land known as Roosenburgh was leased to Dirk Ariensz. Bisdommer and Son, the first permanent inhabitant of Rozenburg.

In 1950, the Nieuwe Maas (or Brielse Maas) was dammed off at both ends of Rozenburg Island, thereby forming Brielse Meer and connecting it to Voorne-Putten Island.

Beginning in the same period, most of the island was given to industrial enterprise, part of the Port of Rotterdam (Botlek and Europoort). When these sea ports were being planned in the 1950s, the councils of Rotterdam and Rozenburg made the arrangement that Rotterdam would lead the development of the ports and industry, whereas Rozenburg would take care of housing development for the expected population increase. The village of Blankenburg on the island had to be completely removed to make way for new canals and industry. The new housing developments were concentrated around the old village centre of Rozenburg on Het Scheur. In a short period, its population rose from 3500 to over 14000.

The Hook of Holland bit was extended with a large polder called Maasvlakte, which contains large sea harbours and petrochemical industry.

There is a refinery located in Rozenburg. The Rozenburg refinery is now owned by Kuwait Petroleum Europort BV which is a subsidiary of Kuwait Petroleum International, KPI.

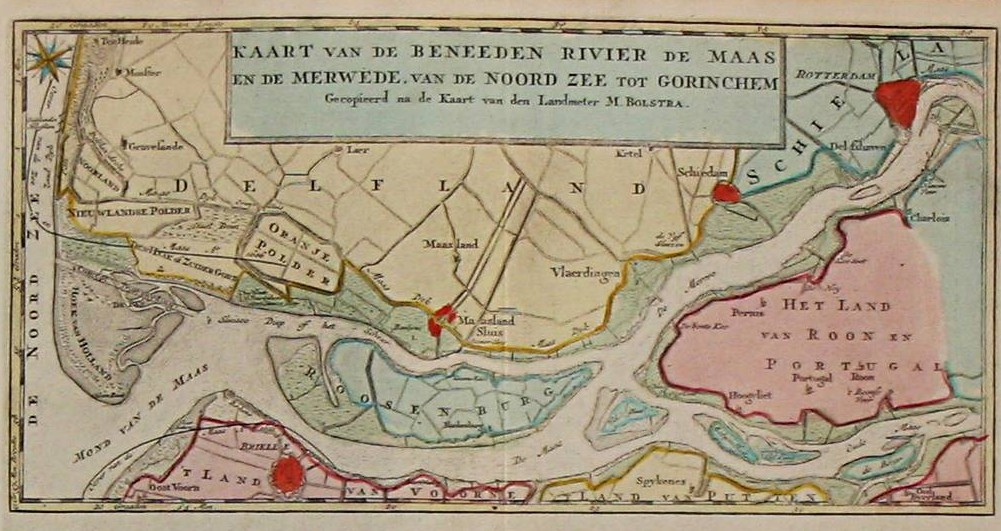
Rozenburg Island in 1769

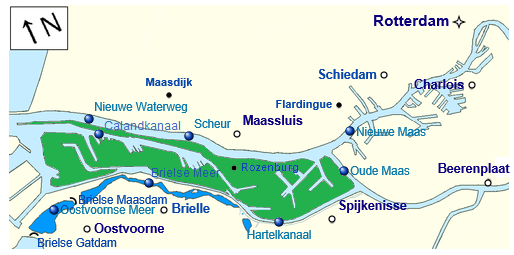
The same region today, Rozenburg Island in green, Brielse Meer in dark blue.

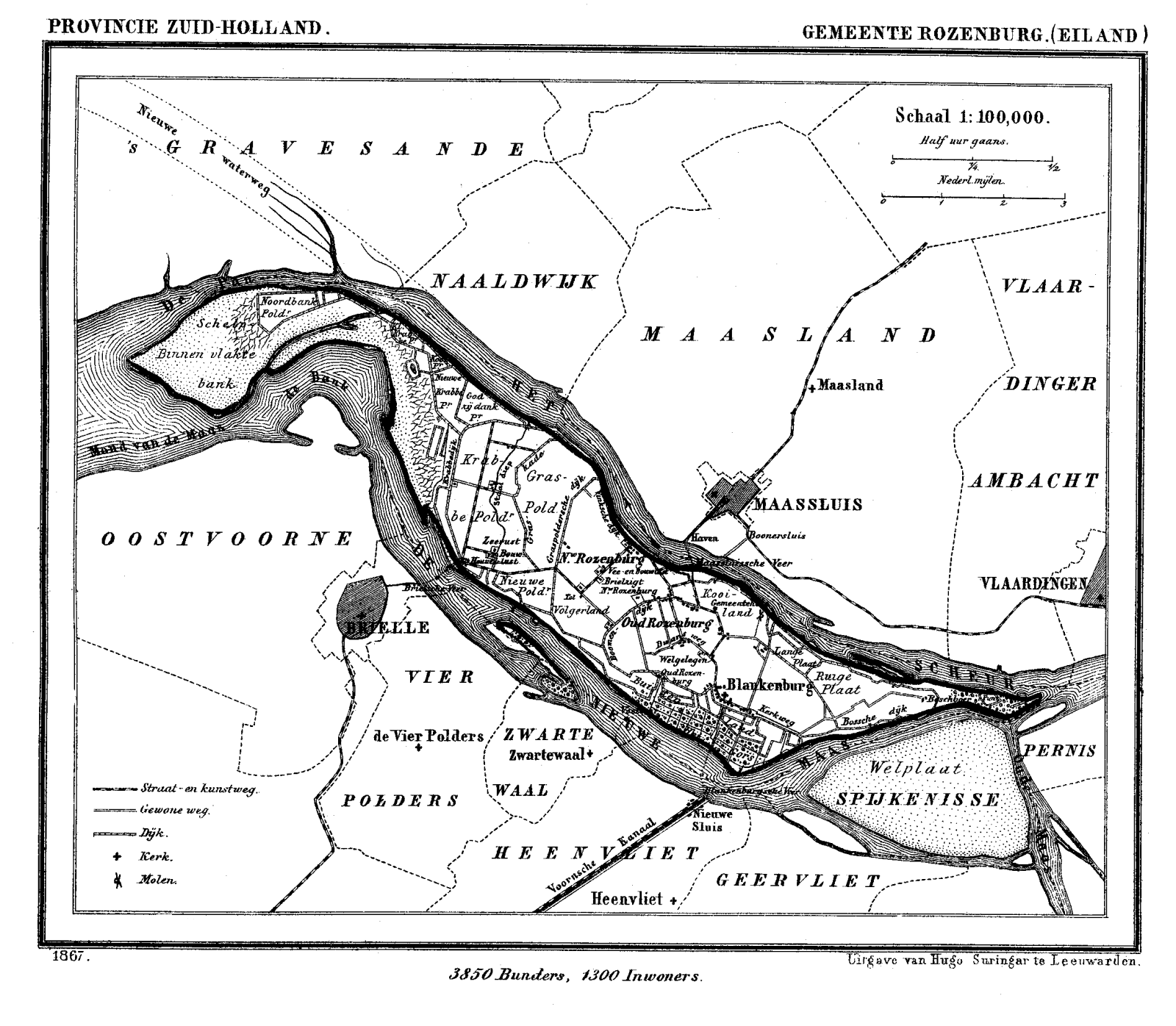
Rozenburg Island in 1867, just before the construction of the Nieuwe Waterweg, its planned route visible in the top left corner

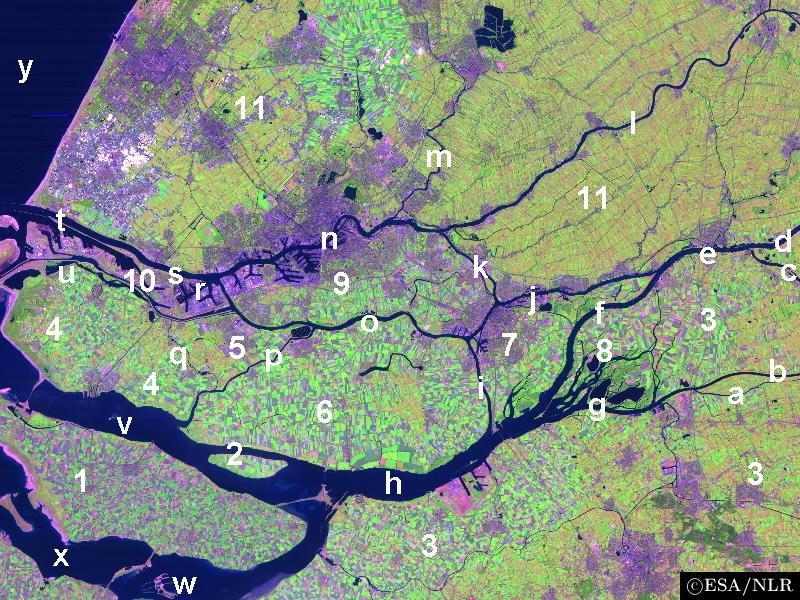
Satellite image of the Rhine–Meuse–Scheldt delta showing the island of Rozenburg (10)

== Born in Rozenburg ==
Famous people that were born in Rozenburg:

- Johannes van der Giessen (1899–2008), oldest man from the Netherlands.
- Bonnie St. Claire (1949), singer.
- Fidan Ekiz (1976), journalist/documentary maker.
- Alex van der Zouwen (1986), rapper with the artist name Kraantje Pappie

== Attractions ==
- Rozenburg wind wall
