= Blankenburg (Rozenburg) =

Former village on Rozenburg, Netherlands

Coordinates: 51°54′N 4°15′E

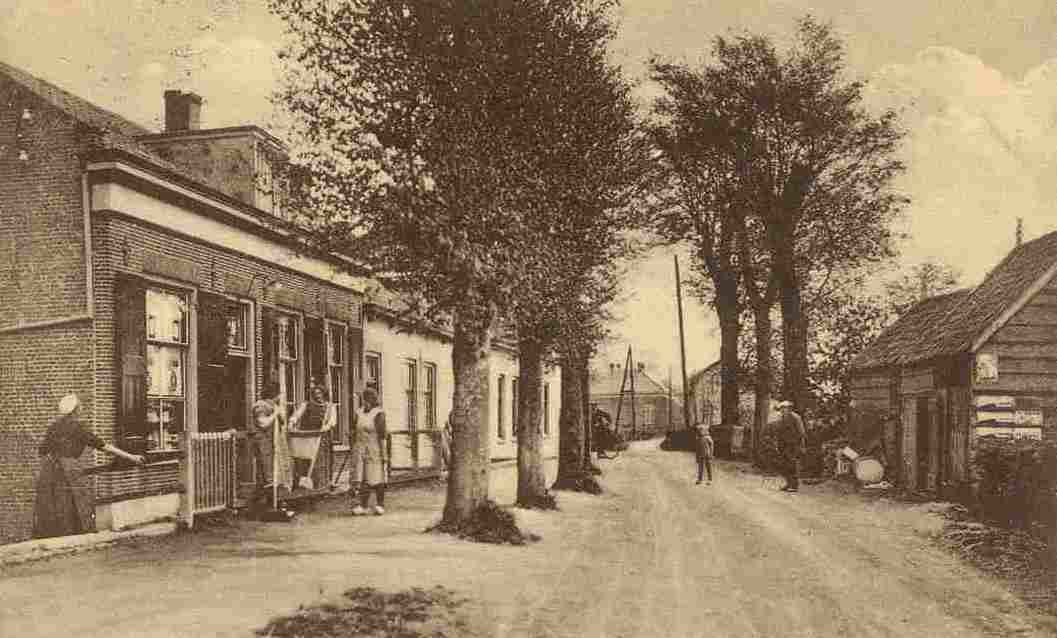
Blankenburg 1925

Blankenburg is a former village that was located on the Dutch island of Rozenburg in the province of South Holland. It was located to the west of Rotterdam and to the southeast of the village of Rozenburg and was part of the Blankenburg island polder of the same name, which was created around 1600 by migrants from Blankenberge in Flanders. Soon after, it formed a single island with Rozenburg and a few embankments in the Maas estuary. The village that originated in the seventeenth century was completely abandoned in the early 1960s due to the construction of Europoort.

One of the first inhabitants of the island was Willem Pietersz. Moerman (ca.1575-1648), a farmer, birdwatcher and hunter who fled from Flanders during the Eighty Years' War. He most likely gave the island the name Blankenburg, after the town of Blankenberge where he came from. Within a century, the settlement grew into a village with its own church and courthouse.

Until the beginning of the 20th century the village of Blankenburg was the center of the island. Here stood the church, the school and the court house. There was also a ferry connection over the Brielse Maas with Nieuwesluis on the island Voorne-Putten. After 1900 the center was increasingly located on the Maassluis side of the island, in the village that was named Rozenburg but was initially called 'De Buurt' (Dutch for the neighbourhood).

Until 1965, Blankenburg was a village of approximately 400 inhabitants and 130 houses that were built along various dikes. In 1960 the municipality of Rotterdam expropriated the houses and farms for the construction of the Europoort industrial area.

The Rotterdam band The Amazing Stroopwafels wrote a song about the village. The name 'Blankenburg' also lives on in the name of a still existing football club. The name of the Blankenburg Tunnel connection which is currently under construction refers to the former polder.
