= D'Oliphant =

Late 16th century mansion located in the Charlois district of Rotterdam

Coordinates: 51°52′59″N 4°28′12″E

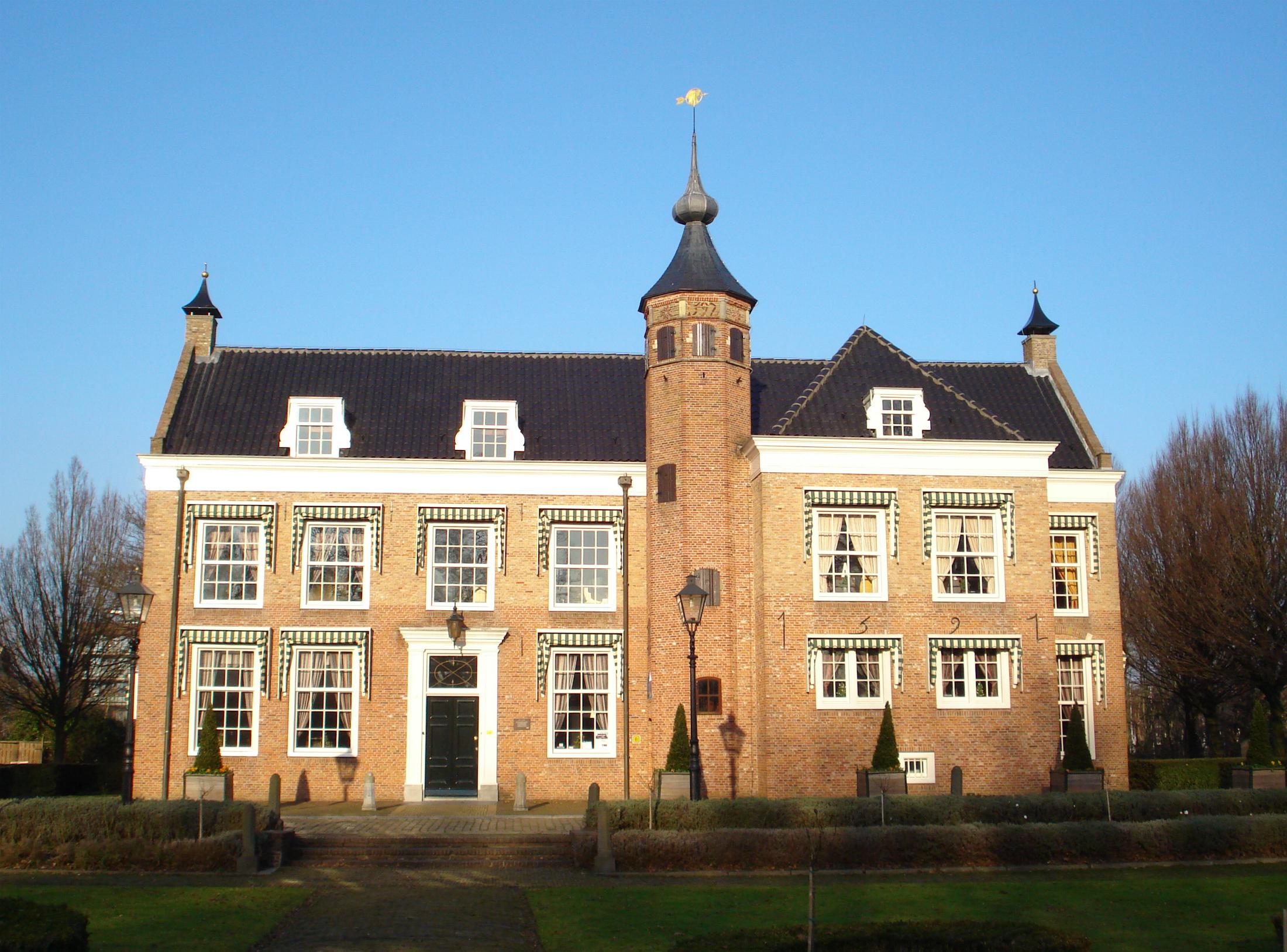
D'Oliphant in its current location

The D'Oliphant, also written as De Oliphant, was commissioned in 1591 by Cornelis van Wijkcool as a farmhouse (Dutch: boerenbehuizinge) built near Nieuwesluis on the island Voorne. Oliphant translates into "Elephant" although the current spelling of the Dutch word is Olifant. The octagonal tower part of the house was probably designed to give the allure of a knight homestead and to suggest that the owner belonged to an ancient and noble family. The house was moved in 1975 and is now located at the Kromme Zandweg 90 in the district of Charlois in Rotterdam.

== Name ==
Cornelis Coolwijk was active in the ivory trade. At the time of the building he lived in Delft, "In de Gulden Olyphant" ("In the Golden Elephant"), which also refers to the source of his fortune. On the front face of the mansion a coat of arms containing an elephant with a castle on its.

== History ==
Initially, the mansion was a tenant farmhouse. In 1772 it turned into an outpost and, in the 19th century, the permanent residence of the mayor of Zwartewaal. There was at one time dairy factory located in the mansion. In 1975, the manor as a whole was moved from Nieuwesluis, Voorne channel to Rotterdam district Charlois, on the site of a recently burned farm. The hamlets of Nieuwesluis, and Blankenburg on the other side of the Brielse Maas, disappeared under meters of sand. The building is now mainly used for business meetings and weddings.
