= Danger! and Other Stories =

1918 collection of stories by Arthur Conan Doyle

- First edition (PDF)
- Author: Sir Arthur Conan Doyle
- Language: English
- Published: London
- Publication date: 1918
- Publication place: United Kingdom
- OCLC: 1073045521

Danger! And Other Stories is a collection of short stories by Sir Arthur Conan Doyle published in 1918.

== Contents ==
- "Danger!: Being the Log of Captain John Sirius"
- "One Crowded Hour"
- "A Point of View"
- "The Fall of Lord Barrymore"
- "The Horror of the Heights"
- "Borrowed Scenes"
- "The Surgeon of Gaster Fell"
- "How It Happened"
- "The Prisoner's Defence"
- "Three of Them"

== "Danger! Being the Log of Captain John Sirius" ==
The collection's title story, "Danger!: Being the Log of Captain John Sirius", was (the preface notes) written 18 months before the outbreak of World War I, and first published in the Strand Magazine in July 1914. It depicts a hypothetical scenario in which a small, fictional European country manages to defeat the United Kingdom by innovative naval strategy using a new technology, the practical combat submarine. The story is a late example of the genre of invasion literature, cautionary tales in which the British are caught unprepared by a continental enemy, often a stand-in for Germany (notable examples being Erskine Childers' The Riddle of the Sands and Saki's When William Came.) Ironically, the work may have led to the thing it was warning against. The work was read by naval officers in Germany, including Alfred von Tirpitz, who cited it as influential on his thinking.

== "The Horror of the Heights" ==
The collection includes the pioneering science fiction story "The Horror of the Heights", one of Doyle's most frequently anthologized short pieces, in which an aviator discovers an invisible ecosystem of translucent lifeforms floating in the upper atmosphere, including bizarre and terrible predators.
