= Danger!: Being the Log of Captain John Sirius =

Short story by Arthur Conan Doyle

- Short story by Arthur Conan Doyle
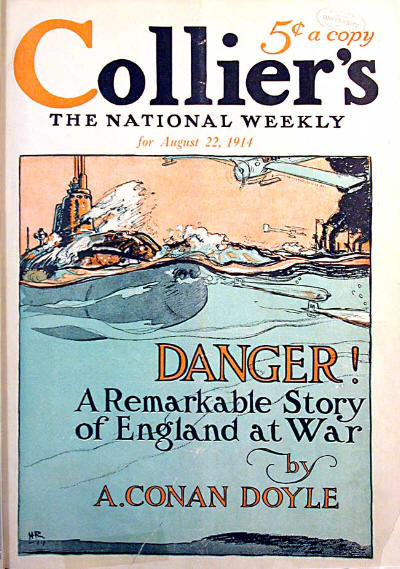
- The cover page of the August 1914 edition of Collier's, illustrated by Henry Reuterdahl.
- Country: United Kingdom
- Language: English

Publication
- Published in: The Strand Magazine
- Publication type: Print, magazine
- Publication date: July 1914

"Danger!: Being the Log of Captain John Sirius" is a short story by Arthur Conan Doyle, first published in The Strand Magazine in July 1914. The story was collected in Danger! and Other Stories in 1918. It depicts a hypothetical scenario in which a small, fictional European country, Norland, manages to defeat the United Kingdom by an innovative naval strategy using a new technology, the practical combat submarine, to establish a blockade of British ports in order to cut off the nation's supplies, and culminates in the torpedoing of a large passenger liner.

The story is a late example of the genre of invasion literature, cautionary tales in which the British are caught unprepared by a continental enemy, often a stand-in for Germany (notable examples being Erskine Childers' The Riddle of the Sands and Saki's When William Came), and was intended to call attention to the threat of submarines in warfare

== Publication ==
"Danger!: Being the Log of Captain John Sirius" was written 18 months before the outbreak of World War I, and first published in the Strand Magazine in July 1914. It was collected in Danger! and Other Stories in 1918.

== Plot ==
The small nation of Norland has been somewhat reluctantly drawn into war with Britain by a violent colonial incident. The Norland navy - while professional - is quite small, and wholly inadequate for a confrontation with the might of the Royal Navy. However, Norland possesses a flotilla of eight modern submarines, which captain John Sirius requests be placed under his command.

Sirius uses the submarines to mount a naval blockade around the British Isles, destroying incoming food-laden freighters. The British experience rapid, enormous increases in the cost of basic staples, which soon turn into famine and massive social unrest. In the climax of the story, Sirius demonstrates that the British navy is unable to stop him by torpedoing the RMS Olympic off Liverpool. The humiliated British are forced to sue for terms.

== Analysis ==
Norland is depicted as a North European country, with a shore on the North Sea. While linguistically Germanic - "Norrland" and "Nordland" are the names of a region in Sweden and a county in Norway, respectively, and Norland's main port is Blankenberg, the name of several actual German municipalities - it is however explicitly not Germany, which remains neutral in the war (though Germans are depicted as sympathetic to Norland's cause.) Norland has a colonial empire; and a border dispute with a British colony - exacerbated by the deaths of two missionaries, and the desecration of a British flag - is the direct cause of the war. It is also a monarchy, whose monarch seems to retain actual executive power; the crucial policy meeting in which it is resolved to defy a British ultimatum and embark on submarine warfare is attended by the king, the foreign secretary, an admiral, and Captain Sirius; a prime minister is conspicuously absent.

The story correctly anticipates the U-boat strategy, which Germany would use in both World Wars to target foodstuffs Britain was unable to produce domestically. It also forecast that attackers would have to target American ships bringing supplies to Britain, and that the British would have to introduce rationing.

Unusually in the invasion literature genre, the story is narrated in first person by Captain Sirius, the victorious enemy commander.

Ironically, the work may have led to the thing it was warning against. The work was read by naval officers in Germany, including Alfred von Tirpitz, who cited it as influential on his thinking. Admiral Eduard von Capelle testified before the Reichstag that

Gentlemen, it is well known that there was published in England before the war a pamphlet which described U-boat warfare in an absolutely masterly manner and which attracted a great deal of attention. This was a pamphlet written by Conan Doyle. According to this pamphlet, a successful U-boat war was carried on against England, by eight U-boats.
