= Rozenburg (island) =

Island in South Holland province, Netherlands

Coordinates: 51°55′39″N 4°10′49″E

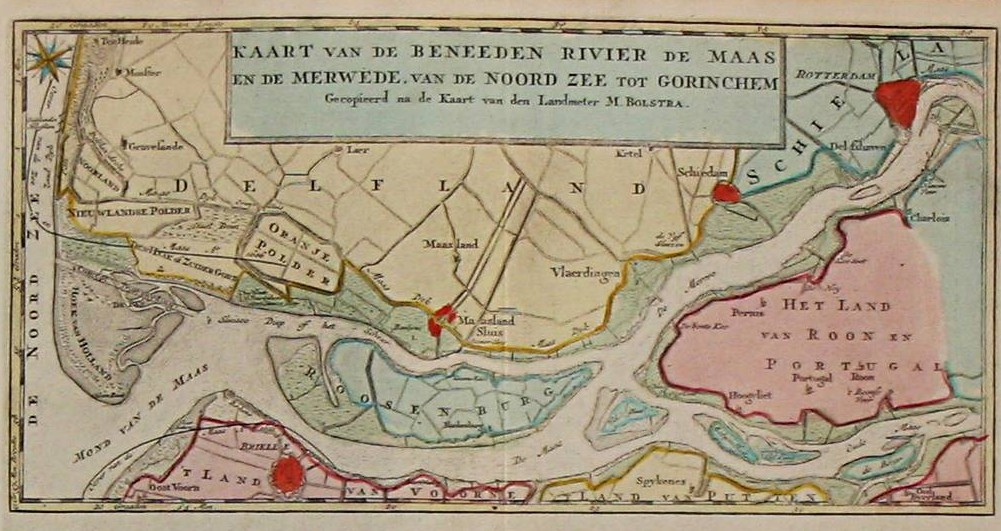
Rozenburg Island in 1769.

Rozenburg is an island in western Netherlands, in the province of South Holland. Rozenburg Island was formed centuries ago from several sand bars in the Meuse estuary. In 1568, construction started on the first set of dikes and in 1586 the land known as Roosenburgh was leased to Dirk Ariensz. Bisdommer and Son, the first permanent inhabitant of Rozenburg.

In 1950, the stretch of the Nieuwe Maas river south of Rozenburg (also locally called the Brielse Maas) was dammed off at both ends of Rozenburg Island, thereby forming Brielse Meer and connecting it to Voorne-Putten Island.

Beginning in the same period, most of the island was given over to industrial enterprise, part of the Port of Rotterdam (Botlek and Europoort). When these sea ports were being planned in the 1950s, the councils of Rotterdam and Rozenburg made the arrangement that Rotterdam would lead the development of the ports and industry, while Rozenburg would look after the housing of the expected population increase. The village of Blankenburg on the island had to be completely removed to make way for new canals and industry. The new housing developments were concentrated around the old village centre of Rozenburg on the Scheur branch. In a short period its population rose from 3,500 to over 14,000.

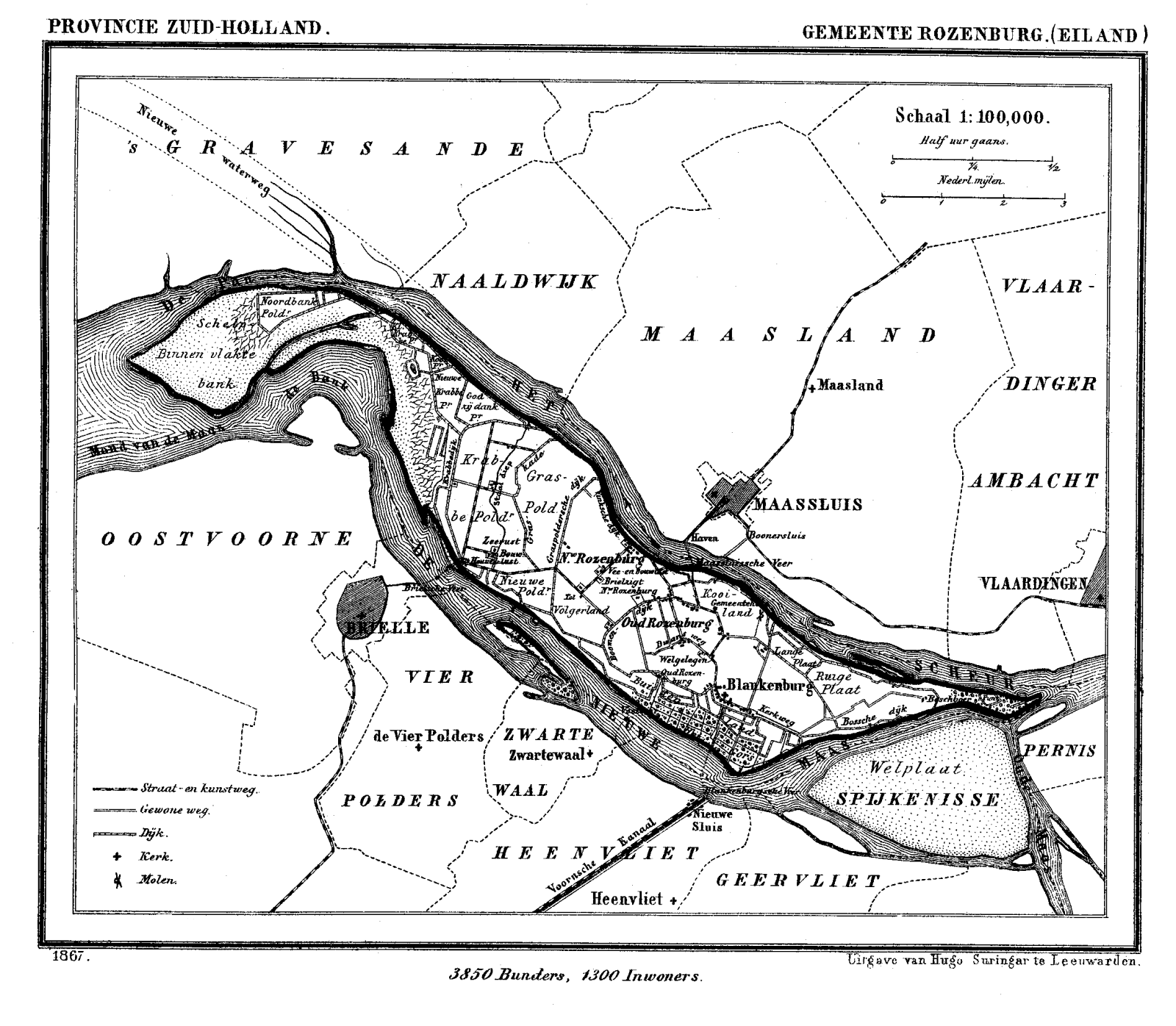
Rozenburg Island in 1867, just before the construction of the Nieuwe Waterweg, its planned route visible in the top left corner.

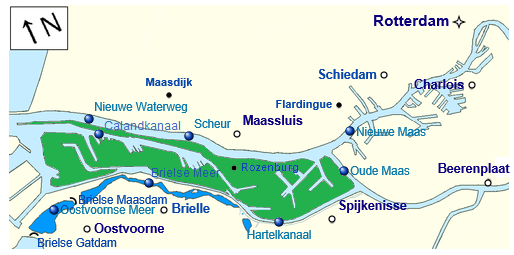
Rozenburg Island today, in green

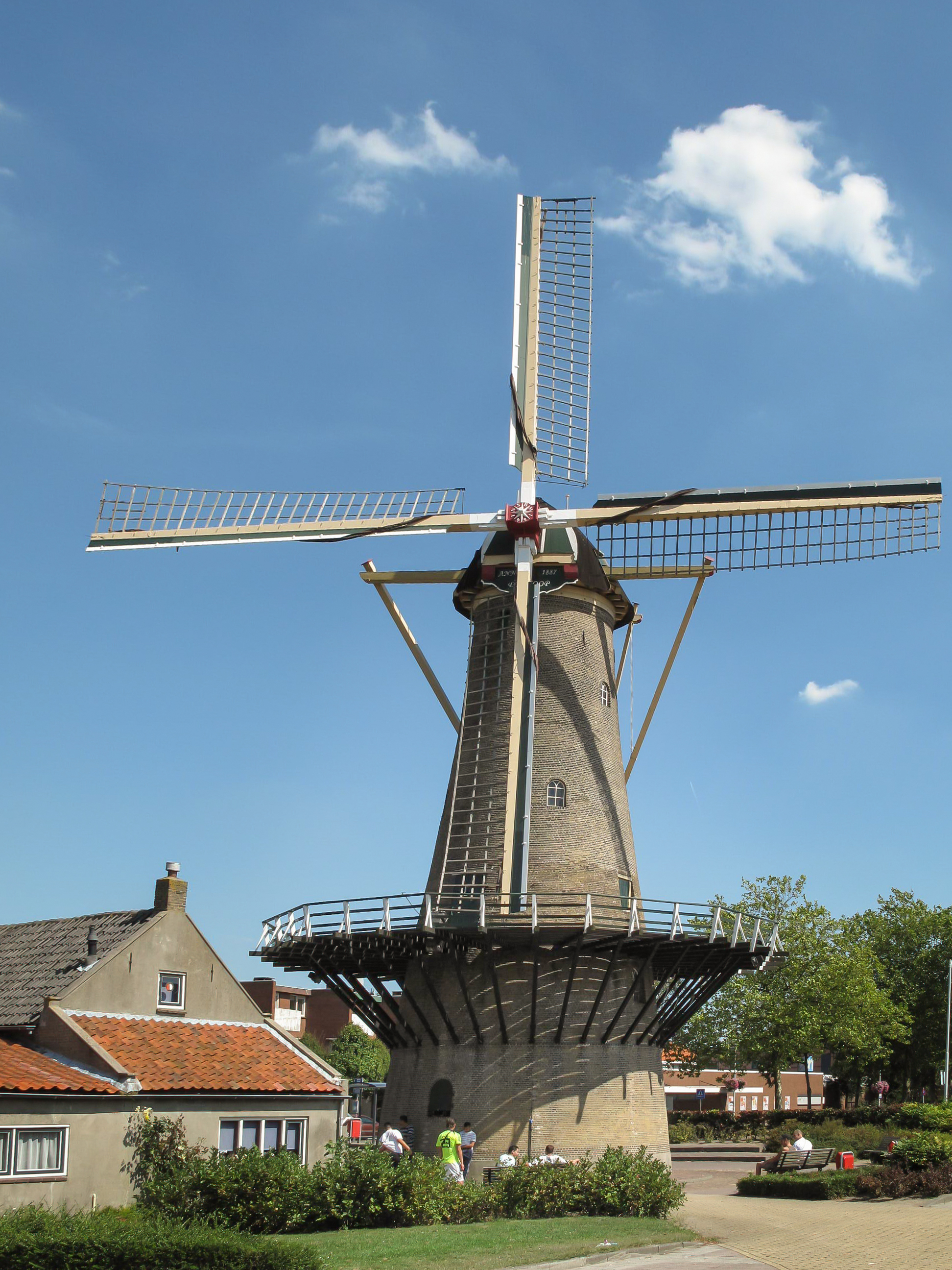
Windmill, molen de Hoop

== See also ==
- Rozenburg – the town on the island, since 2010 a submunicipality of Rotterdam
