= The Horror of the Heights =

- Short story by Arthur Conan Doyle
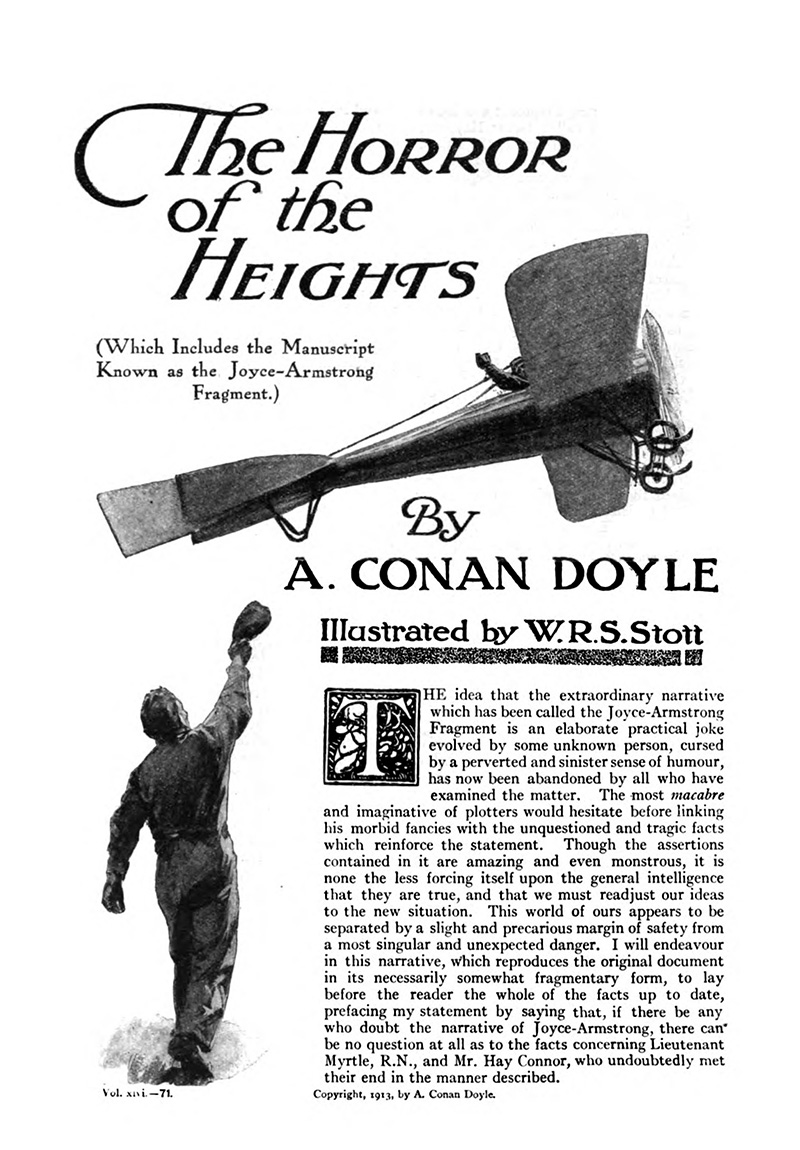

Text available at Wikisource
- Country: United Kingdom
- Language: English
- Genre: Horror

Publication
- Published in: The Strand Magazine (vol. 46, no. 275)
- Publication date: November 1913

"The Horror of the Heights" is a horror short story by Arthur Conan Doyle. It was first published in volume 46, number 275 of The Strand Magazine in November 1913.

== Synopsis ==
The story is told through a blood-stained notebook discovered on the edge of a farm in Withyham. The notebook is written by a Mr. Joyce-Armstrong, and the first two and last pages are missing; the notebook is thus dubbed the "Joyce-Armstrong Fragment".

Joyce-Armstrong, a brave aviator, had been curious over the deaths of certain pilots who tried to break the current height record of 30,000 feet. Recent casualties involve some strange deaths – one, Hay Connor, died after landing while he was still in his plane, while another, Myrtle, was discovered with his head missing. Joyce-Armstrong speculates that the answer to these deaths may be the result of what he calls "air-jungles":

There are jungles of the upper air […] One of them lies over the Pau-Biarritz district of France. Another is just over my head as I write here in my house in Wiltshire. I rather think there is a third in the Homburg-Wiesbaden district.

Joyce-Armstrong takes his monoplane to a height of 40,000 feet and is nearly hit by three meteors. It is then that he learns that his speculations are right: entire ecosystems (air-jungles) exist high in the atmosphere, and are inhabited by huge, gelatinous, semi-solid creatures. After going through a flock of animals superficially resembling jellyfish and snakes, Joyce-Armstrong is attacked by a more solid-looking but amorphous creature with a beak and tentacles, from which he narrowly escapes. He then returns to the ground.

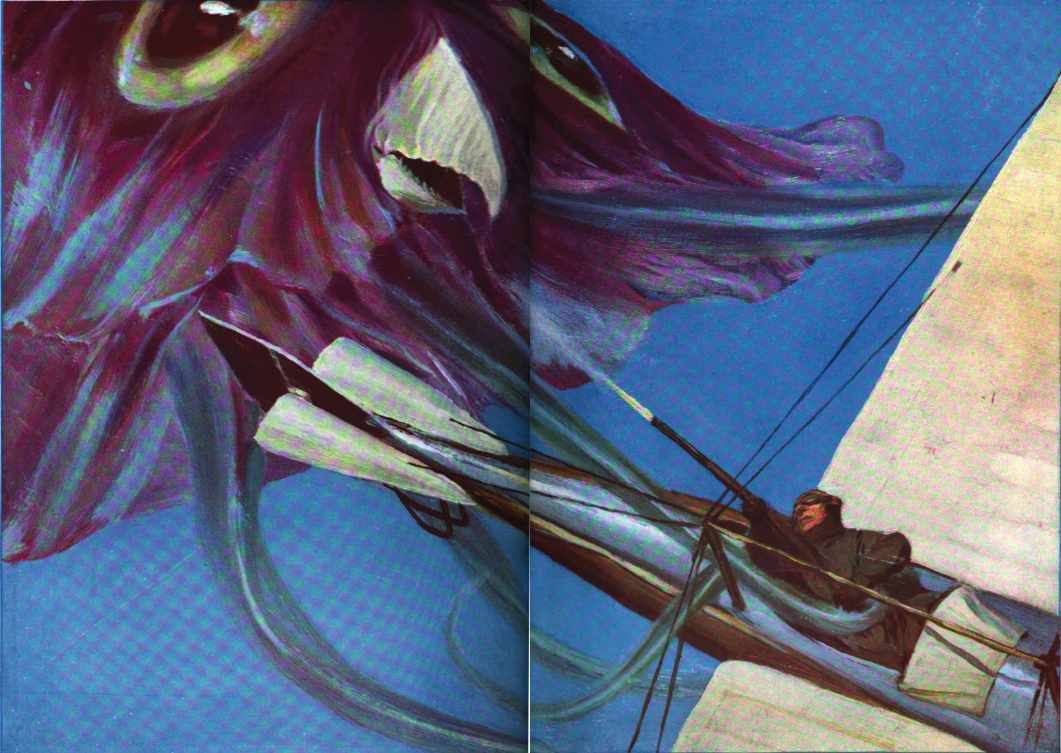
Illustration by W. R. S. Stott

The aviator writes he will be going up again to the air-jungle to bring back proof of his discoveries, but here the fragment ends, save for one last sentence which reads:

"Forty-three thousand feet. I shall never see earth again. They are beneath me, three of them. God help me; it is a dreadful death to die!"

The narrative outside the notebook then explains that Joyce-Armstrong has been missing and that his monoplane was discovered in a wreck on the border of Kent and Sussex.

== Collections ==
The story has appeared in a number of collections, the earliest being Danger! and Other Stories (1918), as well as in more general collections like Volume 5 of The Road to Science Fiction. In 2018, it was included in the flight-themed horror anthology Flight or Fright.

== Adaptations ==
The story formed a part of Forgotten Futures III.

== See also ==
- Altitude (film)
- Crawfordsville monster
- Space animal hypothesis
