= Rozenburg wind wall =

Coordinates: 51.901402°N 4.224040°E

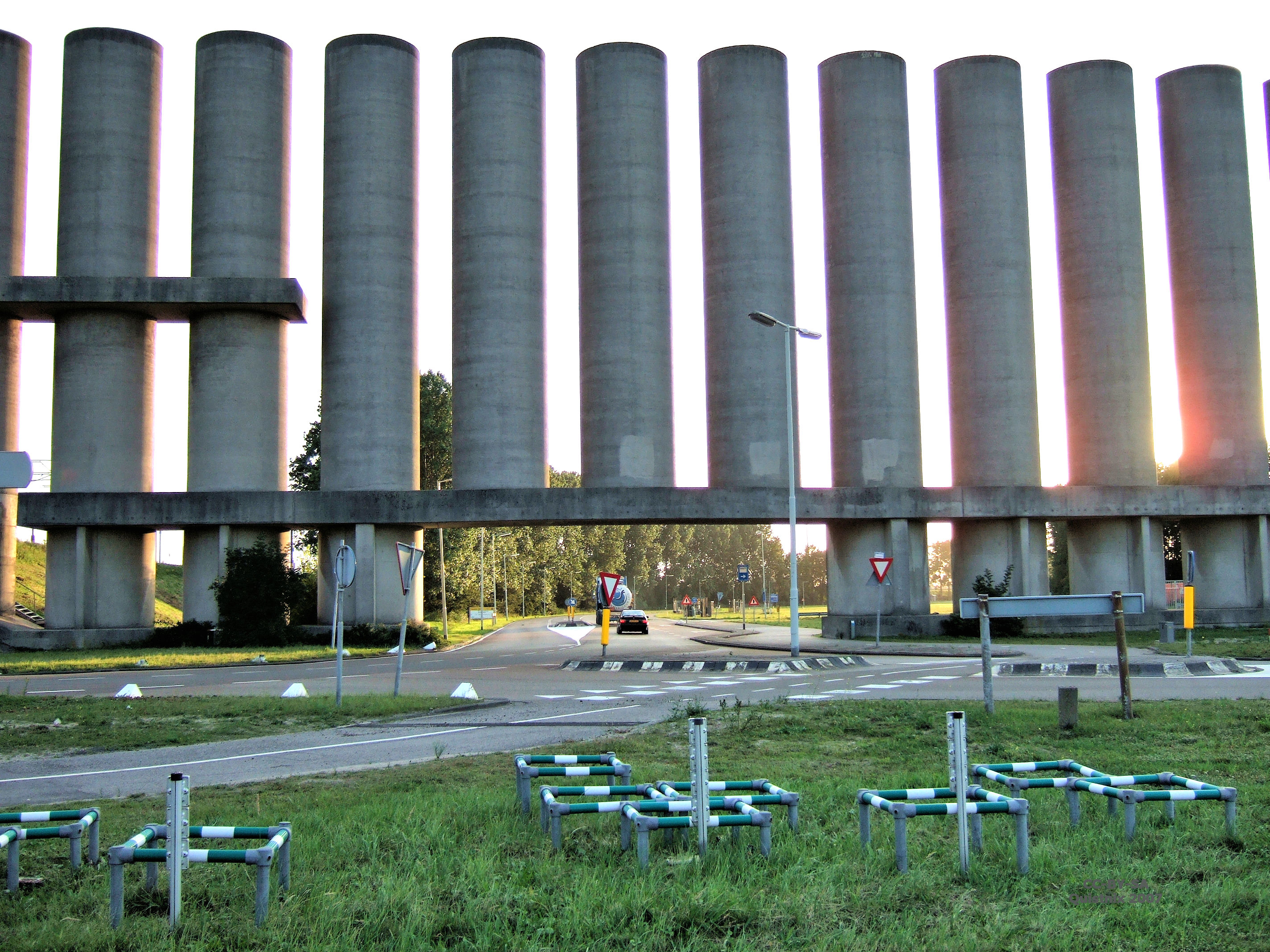
Part of the wind wall with a passage for vehicle traffic.

Rozenburg wind wall in Rozenburg, Netherlands, is a wall built to block wind from entering the Calandkanaal, and ease the passage of large cargo ships through the narrow canal, particularly through the Calandbrug. The wall blocks about 75% of the wind and allows the ships to pass smoothly. The wall is 1600 meters long and it is made up of 125 rectangular and cylindrical slabs, each about 25 meters tall and 18 meters wide.

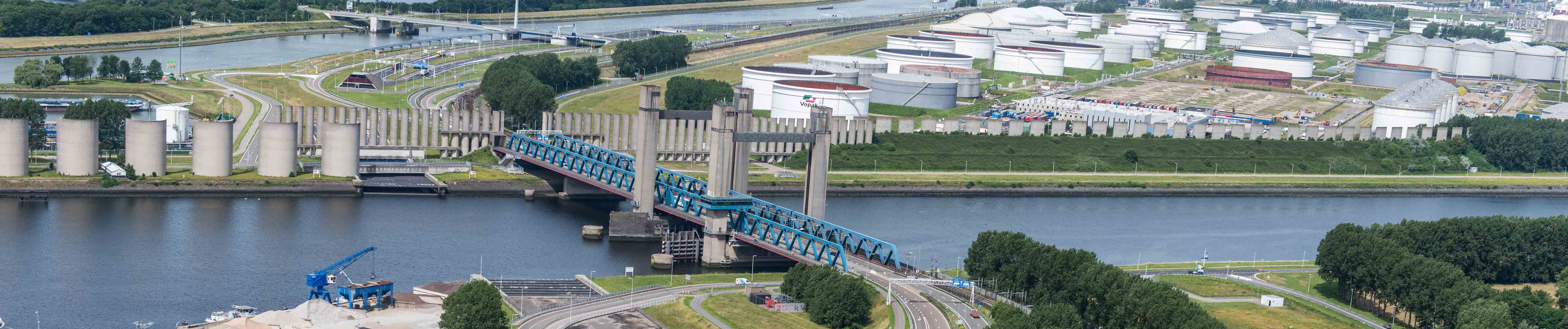
The wind wall spanning the Calandkanaal around the Calandbrug lift bridge.
