= Blankenburg (surname) =

Blankenburg is a German surname. Notable people with the surname include:

- Hermann Ludwig Blankenburg (1876–1956), German composer
- Horst Blankenburg (born 1947), German footballer
- Jo Blankenburg (born 1972), German composer
- Lucretia Longshore Blankenburg (1845–1937), American suffragist, reformer
- Nick Blankenburg (born 1998), American ice hockey player
- Rita Blankenburg (born 1942), German speed skater
- Rudolph Blankenburg (1843–1918), American businessman
- Tom Blankenburg (1909–1979), American swimmer
- Werner Blankenburg (1905–1957), German Nazi politician
