= How It Happened =

- Short story by Arthur Conan Doyle
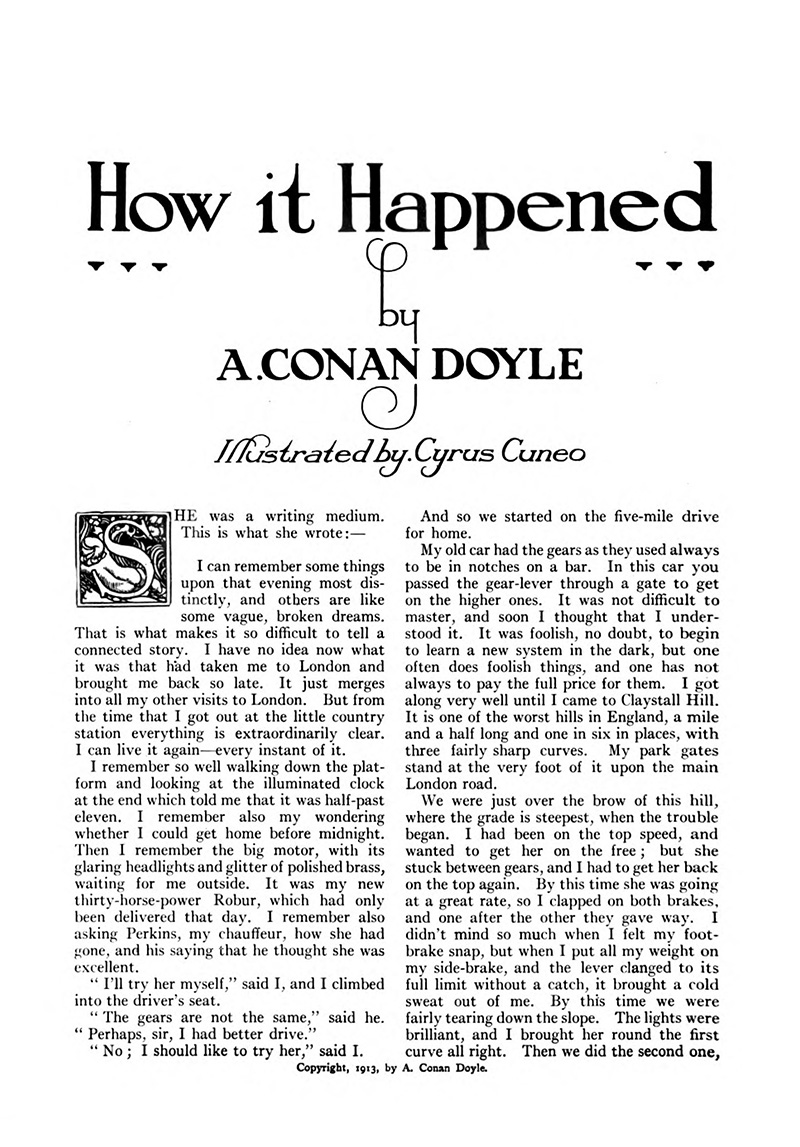
- Country: United Kingdom
- Language: English
- Genre: Short story

Publication
- Published in: The Strand Magazine
- Media type: Print, magazine
- Publication date: September 1913
- Pages: 3

"How It Happened" is a short story by the author Arthur Conan Doyle, first published in The Strand Magazine in September 1913. Doyle began writing it in the Victorian era.

== Plot summary ==
The story is written in the first person; the narrator is a man who is met at the beginning of the story by his chauffeur, Perkins, at half-past eleven at the "little country station" while coming back from London. He wanted to try his new car, which had been delivered that day. He was warned that the gears were not of the same type he is used to but he insisted on driving. They "were just over the brow of" Claystall Hill, "one of the worst hills of England", when he lost all control on the speed of the car. He tried to bring the car back to his house "wheels whirring like a high wind" and did not jump even when advised to do so by Perkins. In the end, he managed to reach home but crashed into the park gate.

The story ends with Perkins having injured his leg and the narrator meeting a dead friend, Stanley, who tells him that he himself died in the accident.

== Adaptions ==
"How It Happened" was adapted for the stage by Doyle and Percival Wilde as "Dawn", which premiered in 1914 in New York City. In the mid-1920s, it was adapted into the silent film How It Happened.

== Interpretation ==
This story is considered to be about wilful masculine pride, and could also be recognized as a warning about the perils of driving at night and in an unfamiliar vehicle. A central theme in this story is loyalty and companionship; the chauffeur, Perkins, offers to take control of the car, which would have allowed the narrator to escape the vehicle. However, the narrator refuses to leave his chauffeur behind and remains in the car until the end, even offering to take the wheel himself and allow Perkins to jump.
