= Amazing Stroopwafels =

Dutch band

The Amazing Stroopwafels is a Dutch band originating from Rotterdam. They started as a duo in 1979, performing as street musicians. During the election campaign period they performed often at street demonstrations for the SP, a Dutch socialist party. The group now consists of Wim Kerkhof (vocals, double bass and piano), Arie van der Graaf (electric guitar) and Rien de Bruin (acoustic guitar and accordion). They're one of the busiest-performing groups in the Netherlands with more than 6000 concerts in thirty years. The predominantly Dutch-language group also toured widely in Denmark.

Although the band never had a hit-record, their 1981 song "Oude Maasweg" (based on Leon Russell's "Manhattan Island Serenade", from the album Carney), which peaked at number 50 in the Dutch singles chart, is a classic in Dutch pop music history. The song starts in English, the second verse continues in Dutch as an impressionist story of heartbreak in the dreary industrial area of Rotterdam. In 2007 the song charted number 16 in the Top 2000, an all-times chart compiled by the listeners of NPO Radio 2.

The Amazing Stroopwafels have released 18 studio albums and 5 compilation albums, one live LP and three DVDs.

== Discography ==
- The Amazing Stroopwafels (1980) LP
- Mooi Weer (1981) LP
- In Vuur En Vlam (1982) LP
- Wat Een Leven! (1983) LP, partly live
- 5 (1984) LP
- De Straat Betaalt (1986) LP
- Oude Maasweg (1986) LP, reissue of Mooi Weer
- The Amazing Stroopwafels (1988) CD, compilation of 6 previous LPs
- Gaan Te Ver (1988) LP/CD
- Macaroni In De Nacht (1990) LP/CD
- Kano's En Gevulde Koeken (1991) CD
- Onbeperkt Houdbaar (1993) CD
- Badmuts Verplicht (1994) CD, compilation of songs about the Rotterdam area
- Het Leven Is Een Feest (1995) CD
- Stroopwafel Speciaal (1996) CD
- Fijn Kamperen (Met Moderne Vrouwen) (1998) CD
- Hard Voor Weinig (2000) CD, compilation of singles from the nineties
- Eeuwige vlam (2001) CD
- Van De Straat (2003) CD
- The Amazing Stroopwafels 25 Jaar (2004) DVD
- Zijpaden (2005) CD, LP tracks from 1980 to 1984
- Van Blankenburg Tot Zwart Nazareth (2006) DVD
- Strooptocht (2007) CD
- 3 (2009) DVD
- Van Eigen Deeg (2010) CD
- Gewoon Gebleven (2012) CD
- All You Can Eat (2014) CD, compilation of songs from 2000 to 2014
- Hiero (2017) CD
