= Blankenberg =

Blankenberg may refer to:

- Blankenberg, Mecklenburg-Vorpommern, part of the Amt Sternberger Seenlandschaft, district of Parchim, Mecklenburg-Vorpommern, Germany
- Blankenberg, Thuringia, part of the Verwaltungsgemeinschaft Saale-Rennsteig, Saale-Orla-Kreis, Thuringia, Germany
- Blankenberg, North Rhine-Westphalia, near Siegburg, part of Hennef (Sieg)
- Ngaire Blankenberg (born 1971/72), a South African-Canadian museum director

== See also ==
- Blankenberge, Belgian town
- Blankenburg (disambiguation)
