= Blankenburg (Verwaltungsgemeinschaft) =

Coordinates: 51.800°N 10.967°E

Blankenburg was a Verwaltungsgemeinschaft ("collective municipality") in the district of Harz, in Saxony-Anhalt, Germany. The seat of the Verwaltungsgemeinschaft was in Blankenburg am Harz. It was disbanded on 1 January 2010.

The Verwaltungsgemeinschaft Blankenburg consisted of the following municipalities:

1. Blankenburg am Harz
2. Cattenstedt
3. Heimburg
4. Hüttenrode
5. Timmenrode
6. Wienrode
