= Härtel =

Härtel or Hartel is a surname. Notable people with the surname include:

- August Hartel (1844–1890), German architect
- Dr Kurt Hartel (1910–2000), German patent lawyer
- Gottfried Christoph Härtel (1763–1827), music publisher in Leipzig
- Jens Härtel (born 1969), German football manager and former player
- Karsten Härtel (born 1961), former German footballer
- Lis Hartel (1921–2009), equestrian from Denmark
- Marcel Hartel (born 1996), German professional footballer
- Michael Hartel (born 1998), German speedway, grasstrack and longtrack rider
- Sascha Härtel (born 1999), German professional footballer
- Stefan Härtel (born 1988), German professional boxer
- Susanne Hartel (born 1988), German football player
- Wilhelm von Hartel (1839–1907), Austrian philologist in classical studies
- Yvonne von Hartel AM, architect and urban planner

== See also ==
- Härtel Antiqua, a font produced by Schriftguss AG
- Hartel Barrier, a storm surge barrier in Spijkenisse, Netherlands
- Breitkopf & Härtel, the world's oldest music publishing house
