= Botlek =

Seaport of Rotterdam, Netherlands

Coordinates: 51°52′59″N 4°17′39″E

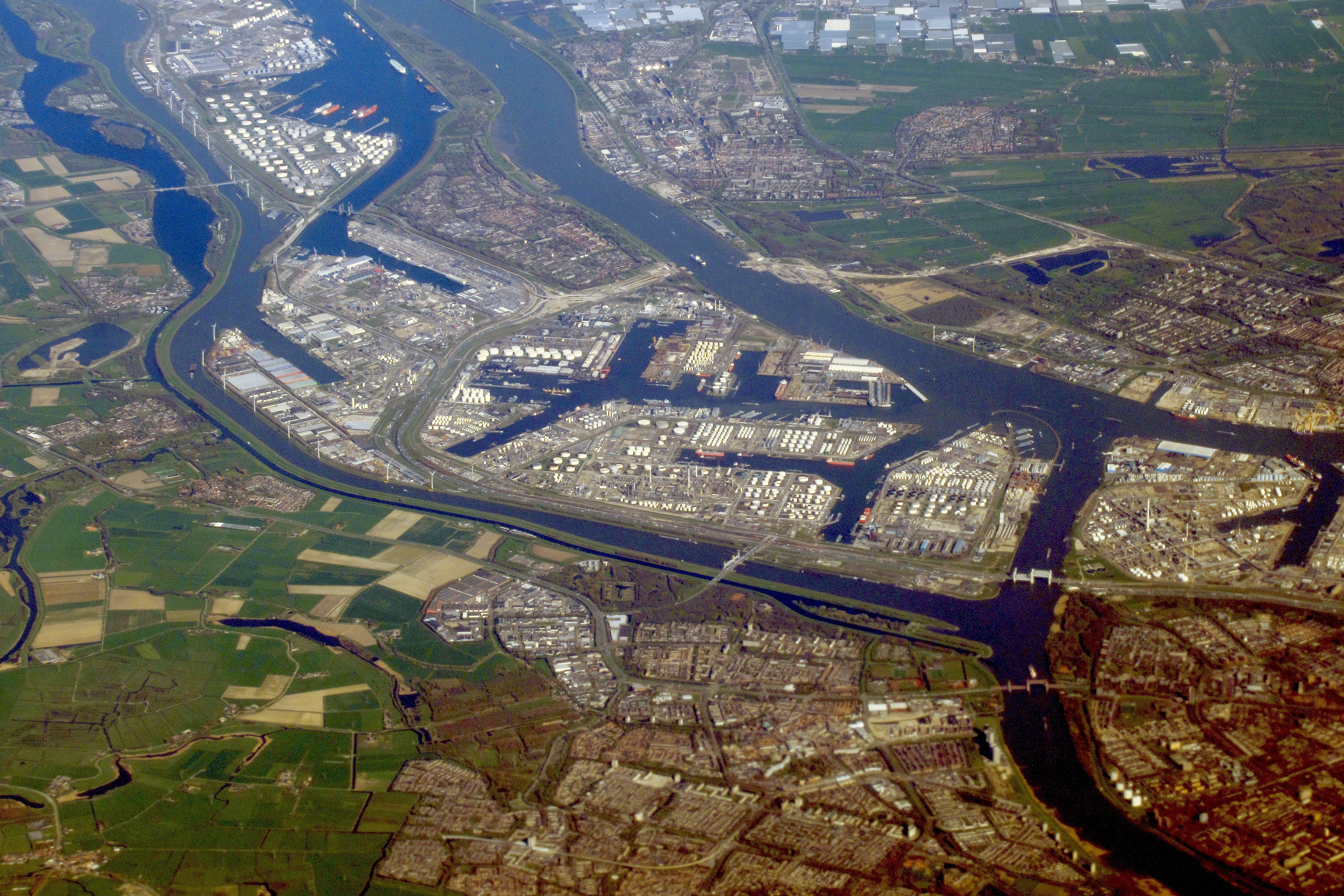
- Aerial view of Botlek, looking northwest
- Interactive map of Botlek

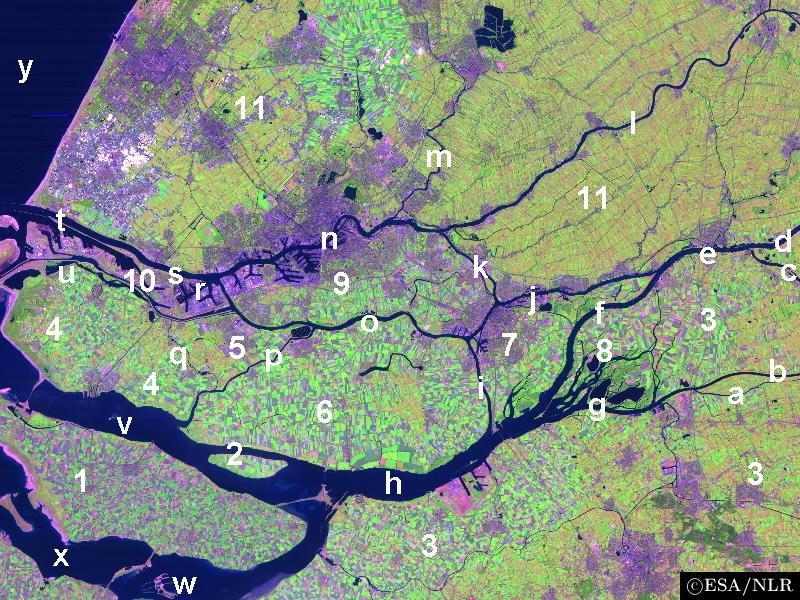
Satellite image of the Rhine–Meuse delta showing the Botlek (r).

Botlek is an industrial port area of Rotterdam, the Netherlands. It specialises in petrochemical logistics.

== History ==
Botlek was originally the name of a stretch of the Nieuwe Maas river, part of the Rhine–Meuse delta near the Dutch cities of Vlaardingen and Spijkenisse in the province of South Holland. Specifically, it was the name of the strait that separated the island of Rozenburg from the sand bar of Welplaat. The strait itself was merely the continuation of the Nieuwe Maas, and the stretch of the river south of Rozenburg continued to be called Nieuwe Maas until the confluence with Het Scheur formed the Brielse Maas estuary (now the Brielse Meer).

Major waterway regulation works were carried out in the Netherlands in the 19th and 20th centuries to improve water management and stop the delta from silting up; the Botlek was first dammed off at its southern end (connecting Rozenburg and Welplaat) between April 1949 and June 1950 and then rebuilt 4,101 ft (1,250 m) to the west in 1956. Parts Rozenburg and Welplaat on either side of the waterway were subsequently developed into an oil port, which could handle larger ships than the old harbor along the Nieuwe Maas.

== Gallery ==
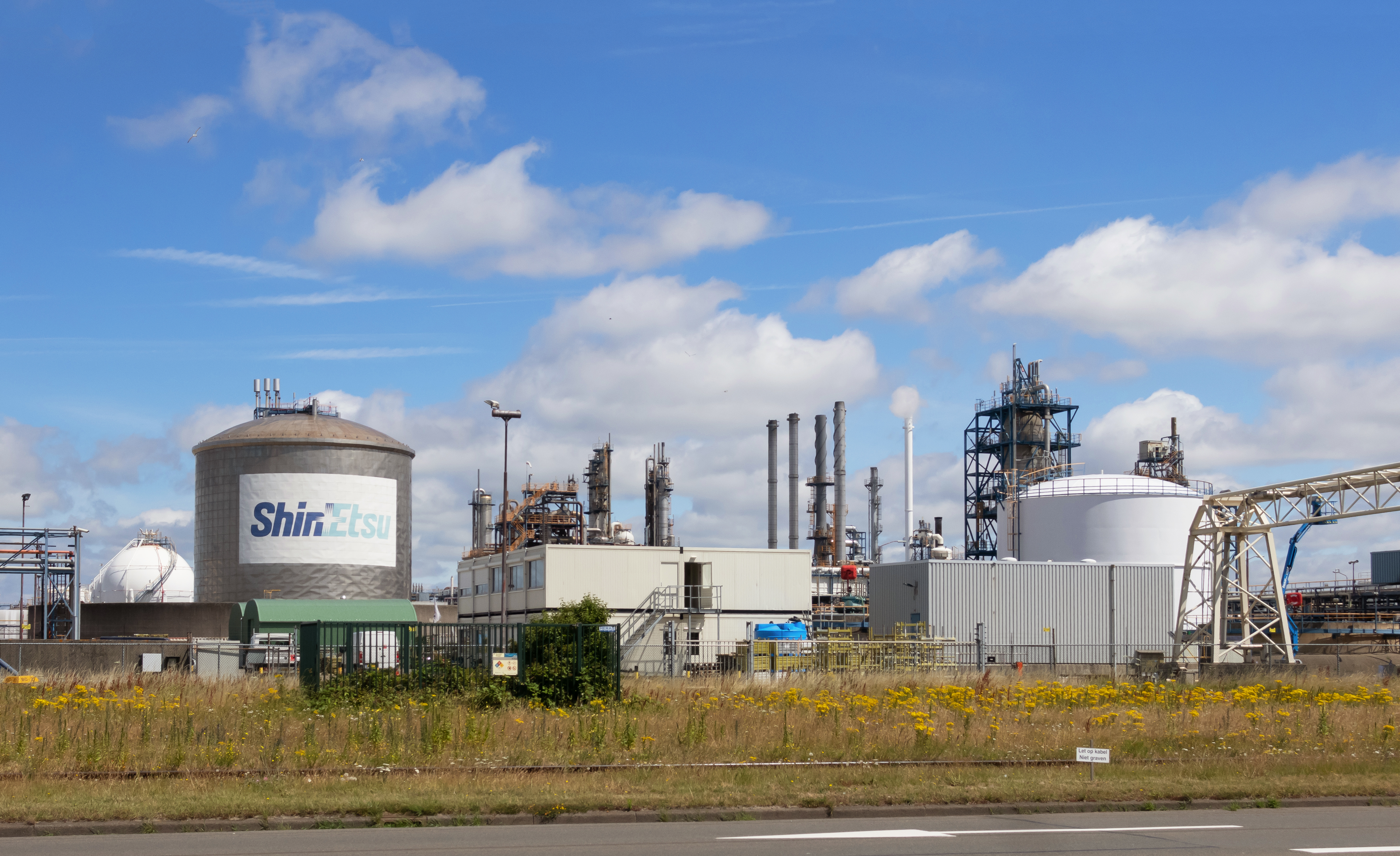
Shin Etsu (vinyl chloride monomer production plant)

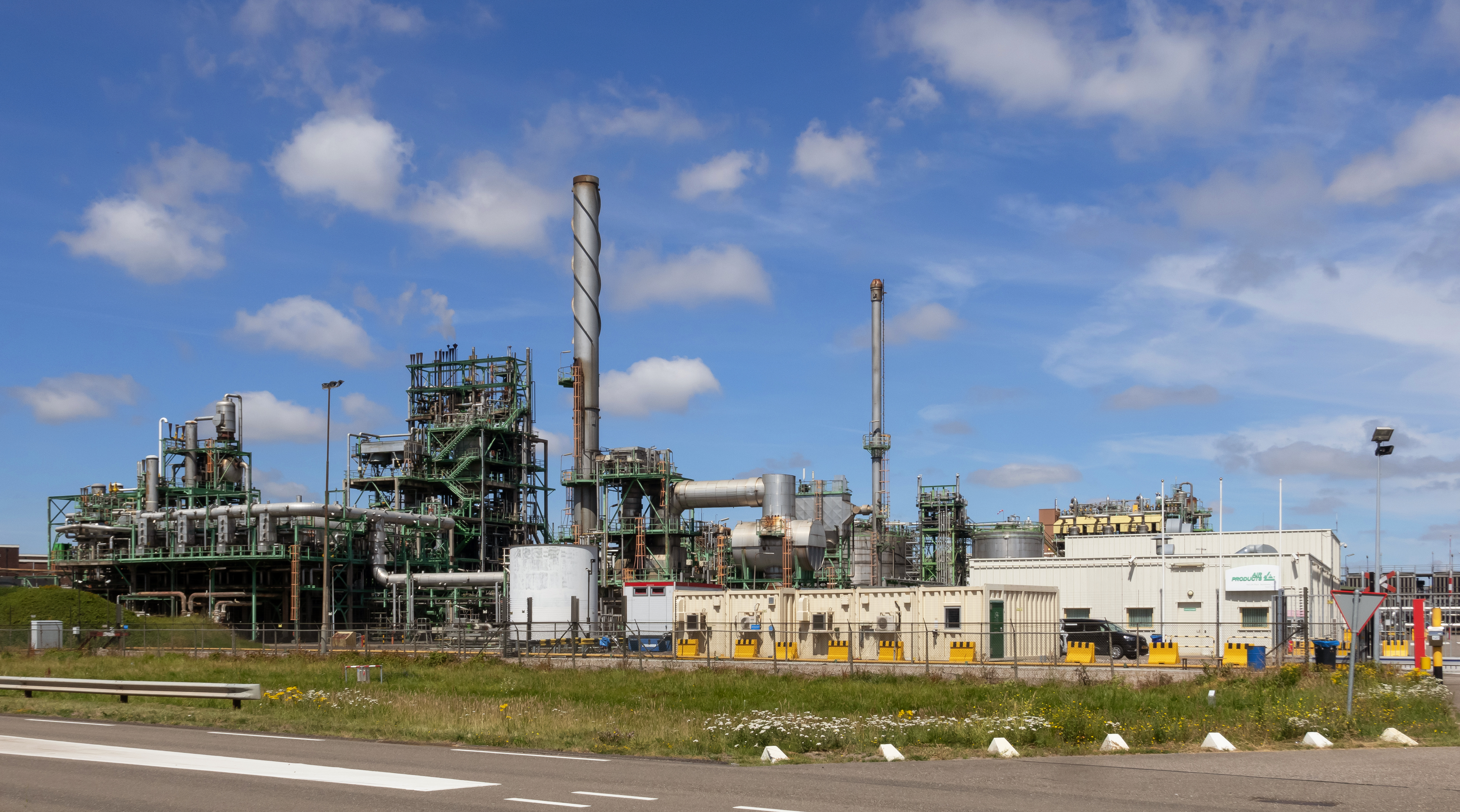
Air Products (factory for producing industrial gases and chemicals)

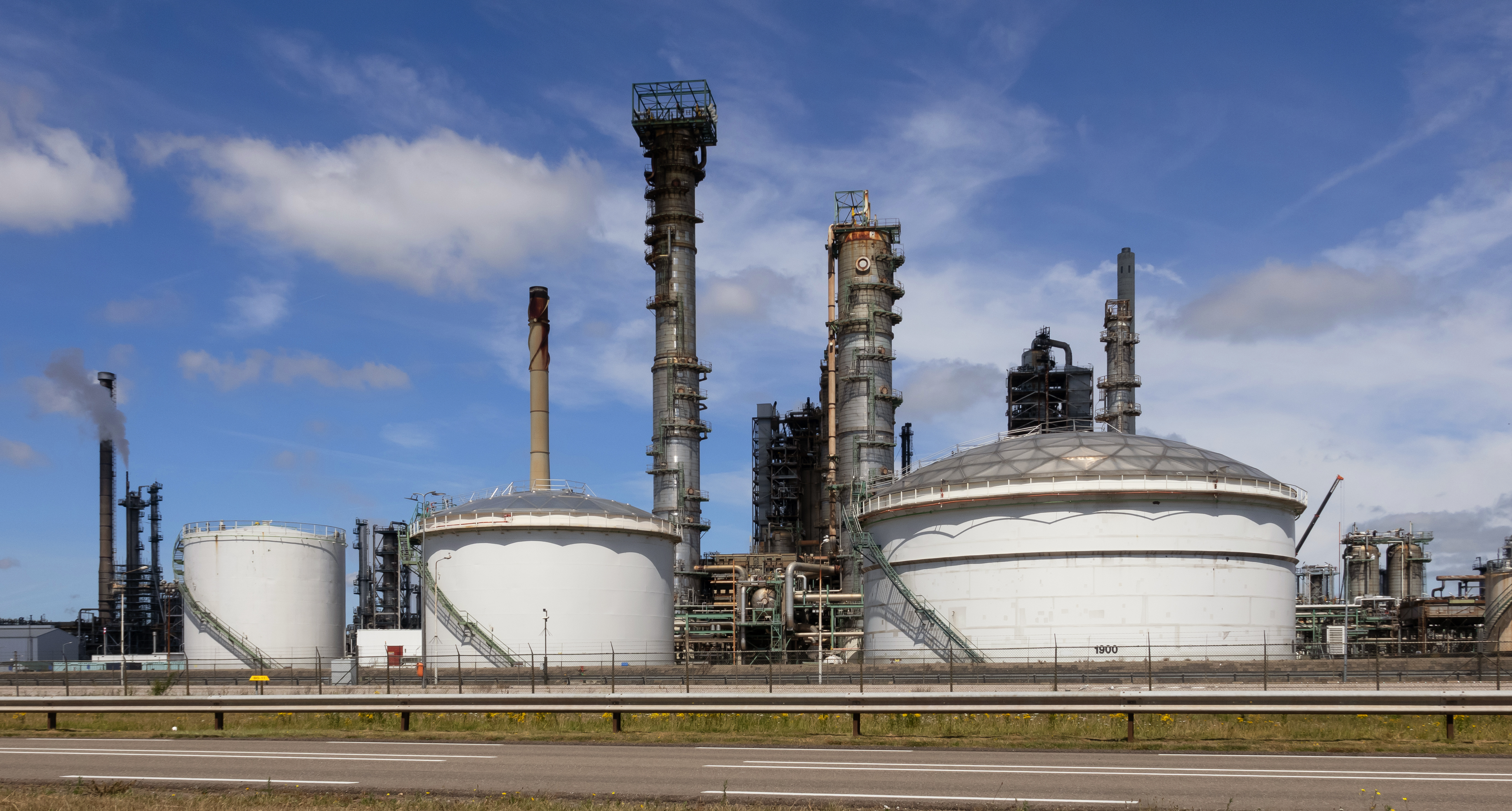
Storage tanks from Esso refinery

== See also ==
- Europoort
