= Rozenburg refinery =

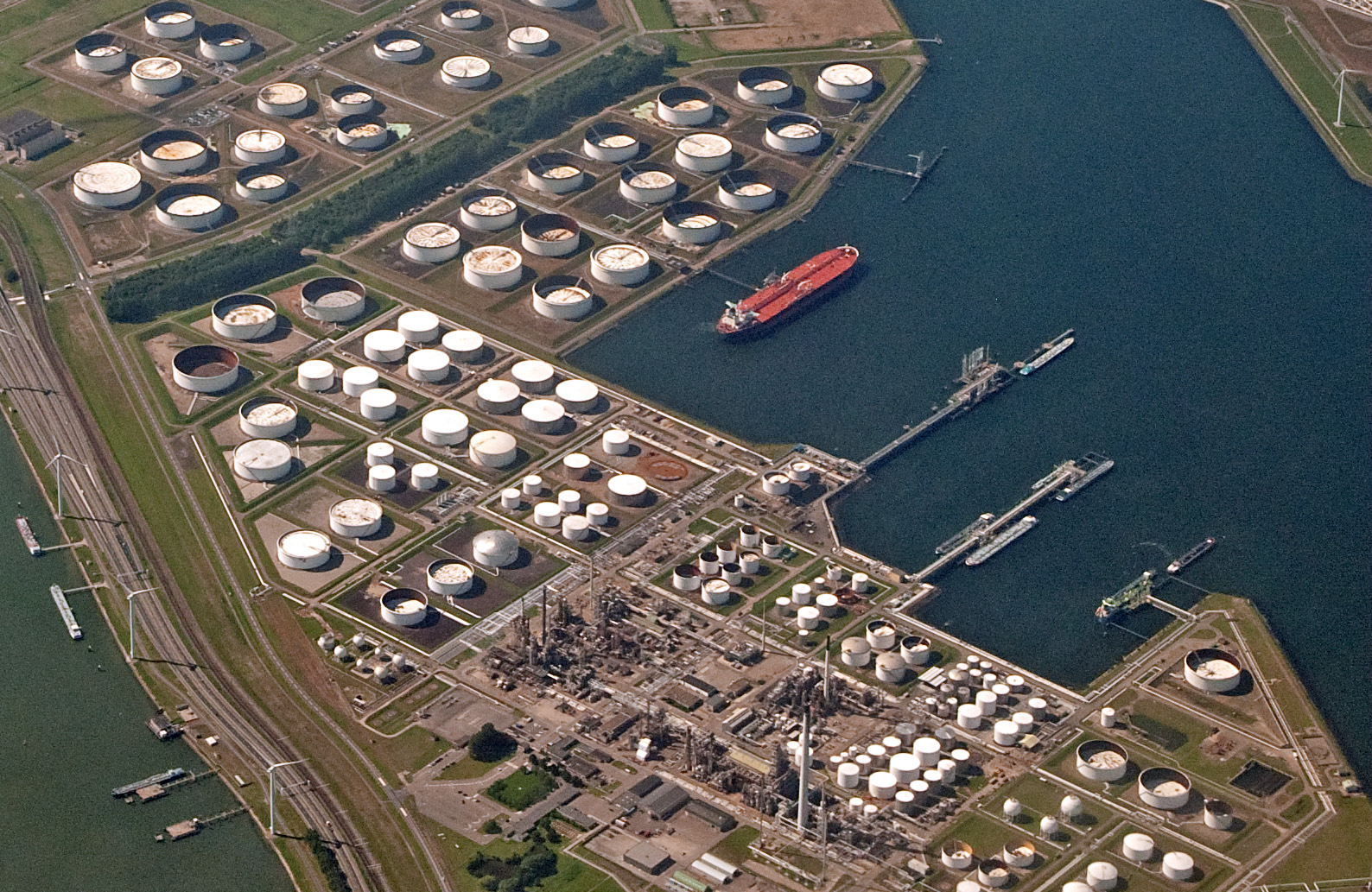
Aerial view of the 5th Petroleum Port of the Europort section of the harbour of Rotterdam, Netherlands, June 2014

The Rozenburg refinery is an oil refinery owned by Kuwait Petroleum Europort BV which is a subsidiary of Kuwait Petroleum International, KPI. It is sometimes referred to as the Europort refinery. The refinery has a capacity of 4 mtpa (80 kbpd) of crude oil and has a Nelson complexity index of approximately 6.

== See also ==
- Oil refinery
- Petroleum
- List of oil refineries
