= Brielse Meer =

Lake in South Holland province, the Netherlands

Brielse Meer Lake Den Briel
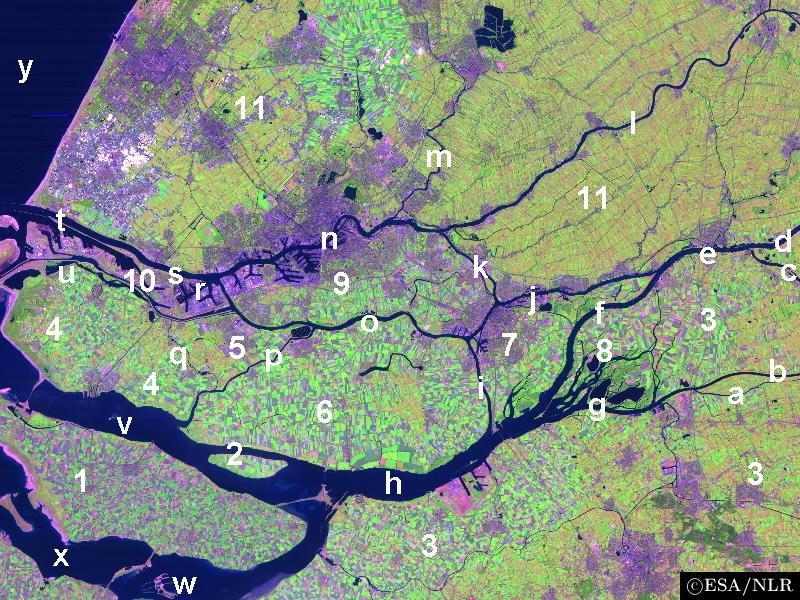
- Satellite image of the Rhine-Meuse delta, showing the lake (u)

- Location within Netherlands
- Location: South Holland, Netherlands
- Coordinates: 51°54′20″N 4°11′23″E
- Basin countries: Netherlands
- Settlements: Den Briel

The Brielse Meer ("Lake Den Briel") is a long, narrow lake between the Dutch estuary islands of Voorne and Rozenburg in the province of South Holland.

The lake takes its name from Den Briel, a town on its shore. It was formerly a branch of the Meuse known as the Brielse Maas (Den Briel Meuse), which ran from the Botlek strait near Rotterdam into the North Sea. The first stretch, between Botlek and the former confluence with the Het Scheur branch, was alternatively known as the last stretch of the Nieuwe Maas.

When the Brielse Maas silted up in the late nineteenth century, the Nieuwe Waterweg ship canal was constructed (1872), and Het Scheur was separated from the Brielse Maas by a dam. As a precursor to the Delta Works sea barrier constructions, the Brielse Maas was closed off at both ends in 1950, becoming the Brielse Meer.

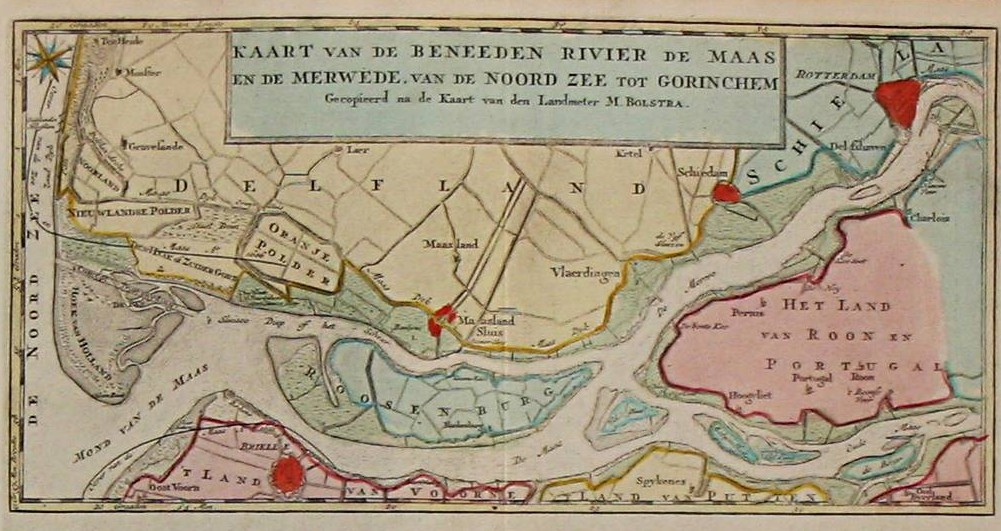
Maasmond in 1769

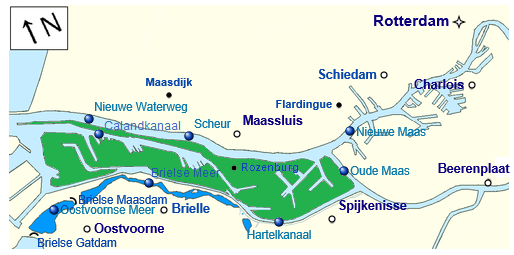
The same region today, the Brielse Meer in dark blue, the Rozenburg island in green.
