= Voorne-Putten =

Island of South Holland province, Netherlands

Coordinates: 51°52′N 4°10′E

- Regio
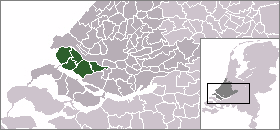
- Country: Netherlands
- Province: South Holland
- Municipalities: Nissewaard and Voorne aan Zee

Area
  - Total: 220 km^{2} (85 sq mi)

Population (2008)
  - Total: 160,000
  - Density: 776/km^{2} (2,010/sq mi)
- Major roads: N57

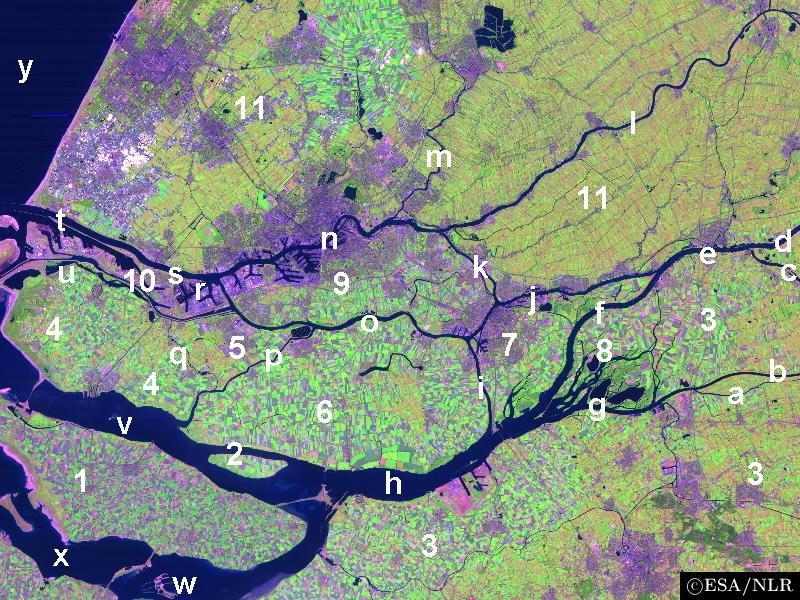
Satellite image of the Rhine–Meuse–Scheldt delta, showing the island of Voorne-Putten (4 and 5)

Voorne-Putten (Dutch pronunciation: [ˌvoːrnə ˈpʏtə(n)]) is an island between the North Sea, the Brielse Meer and the rivers Oude Maas, Spui and Haringvliet in the province of South Holland. Voorne-Putten consists of the two former islands Voorne (the larger, western part) and Putten (the smaller, eastern part). It used to be separated by the river Bernisse which silted up, uniting the two islands. It has 160,000 inhabitants (2008). Recently the riverbed has been dredged, and the two islands have been reformed.

The North Sea coast of Voorne is a valuable nature reserve (sand dunes), even though the northern part of the area has lost much of its estuarine character with the building of the Maasvlakte, an extension of the Port of Rotterdam, in the 1960s. The rest of the island is a mostly agricultural region. The largest town is Spijkenisse. Voorne-Putten consists of the following municipalities:

- Voorne:
  - Voorne aan Zee
  - Nissewaard - Bernisse (Heenvliet, Abbenbroek, and Zuidland)
- Putten:
  - Nissewaard - Bernisse (Geervliet and Simonshaven) and Spijkenisse

Voorne-Putten is separated

- from the island of Rozenburg on the north by the Brielse Meer (dam and bridge)
- from IJsselmonde island on the north-east by the Oude Maas (bridge and metro tunnel)
- from Hoeksche Waard island on the south-east by the Spui (ferry)
- from Goeree-Overflakkee island on the south by Haringvliet (dam)
