= Scheur =

Coordinates: 51.915°N 4.242°E

Scheur (The Rip)
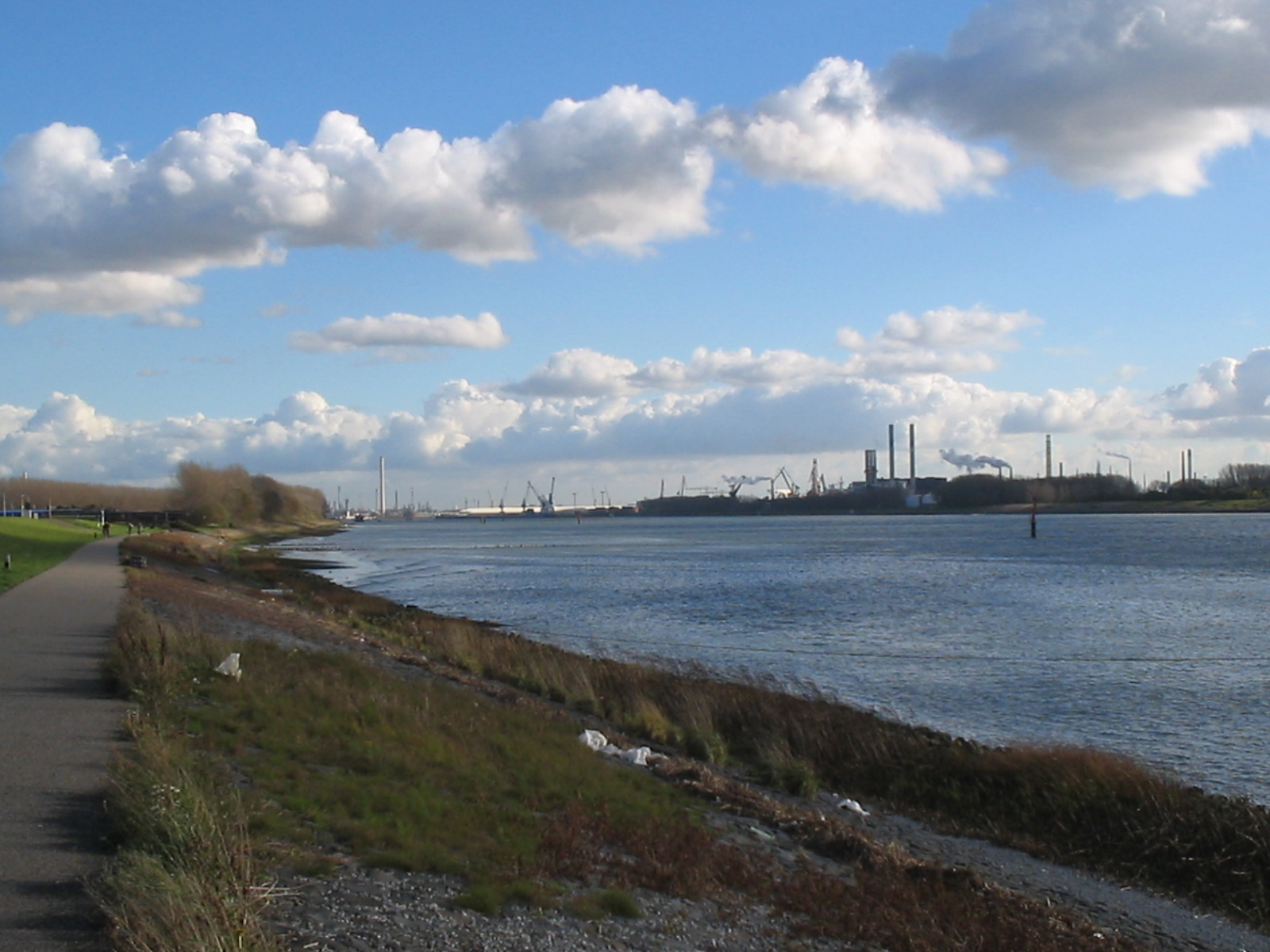
- Near Maassluis

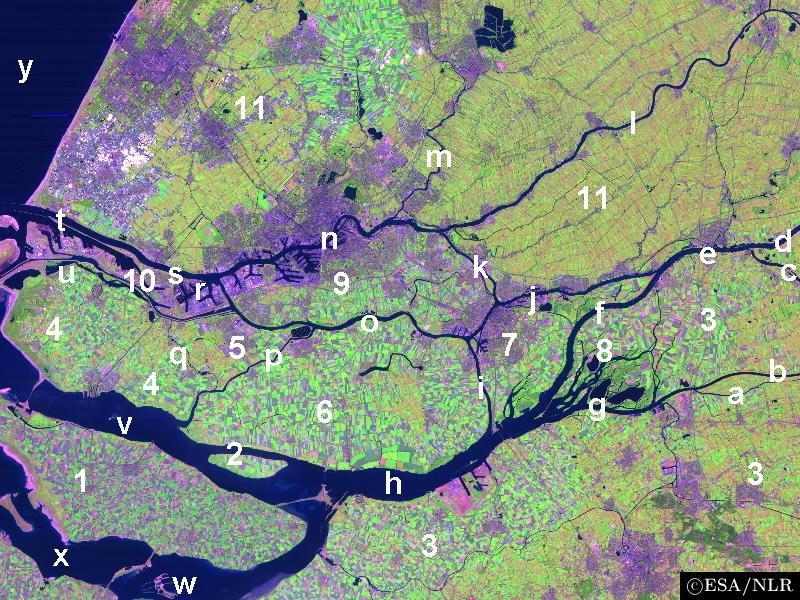
- Northwest part of the Rhine-Meuse delta showing the Scheur (s).

Location
- Country: Netherlands
- Province: South Holland

Physical characteristics
- Source: Nieuwe Maas; Oude Maas
  - location: Vlaardingen
- Mouth: Nieuwe Waterweg
  - location: Rotterdam
- Length: 13 km (8.1 mi)

The Scheur (Dutch pronunciation: [sxøːr]; Dutch for "The Rip") is a branch of the Rhine-Meuse delta in South Holland, Netherlands, that flows west from the confluence of the Oude Maas and Nieuwe Maas branches past the towns of Rozenburg and Maassluis. It continues as the Nieuwe Waterweg (New Waterway) to the North Sea.

Originally, the Scheur was the northern branch of the river around Rozenburg island and curved south a few kilometres past Maassluis to join the Nieuwe Maas again in the Maasmond ("Mouth of Meuse") estuary near Den Briel. When the Nieuwe Waterweg was completed in 1872, the Scheur was dammed off and connected to the east end of the Nieuwe Waterweg to form the new channelized main mouth of the Rhine-Meuse delta.

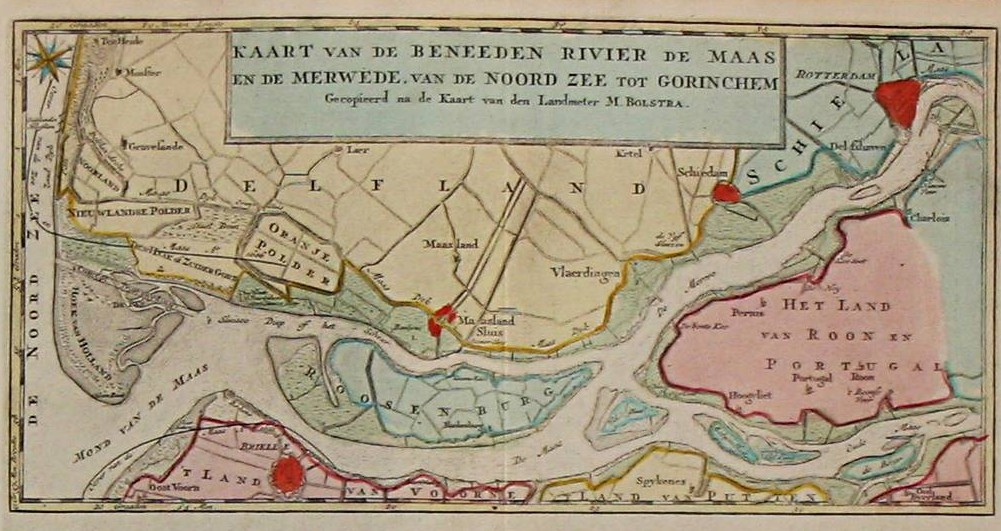
The Scheur and Nieuwe Maas in 1769.

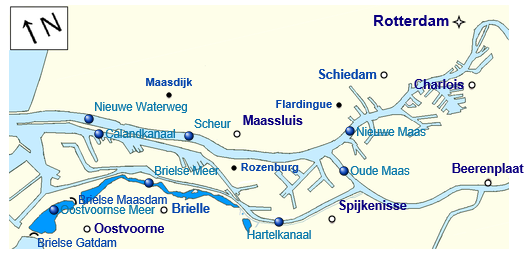
The same region today.
