= Korendijk =

- Former municipality
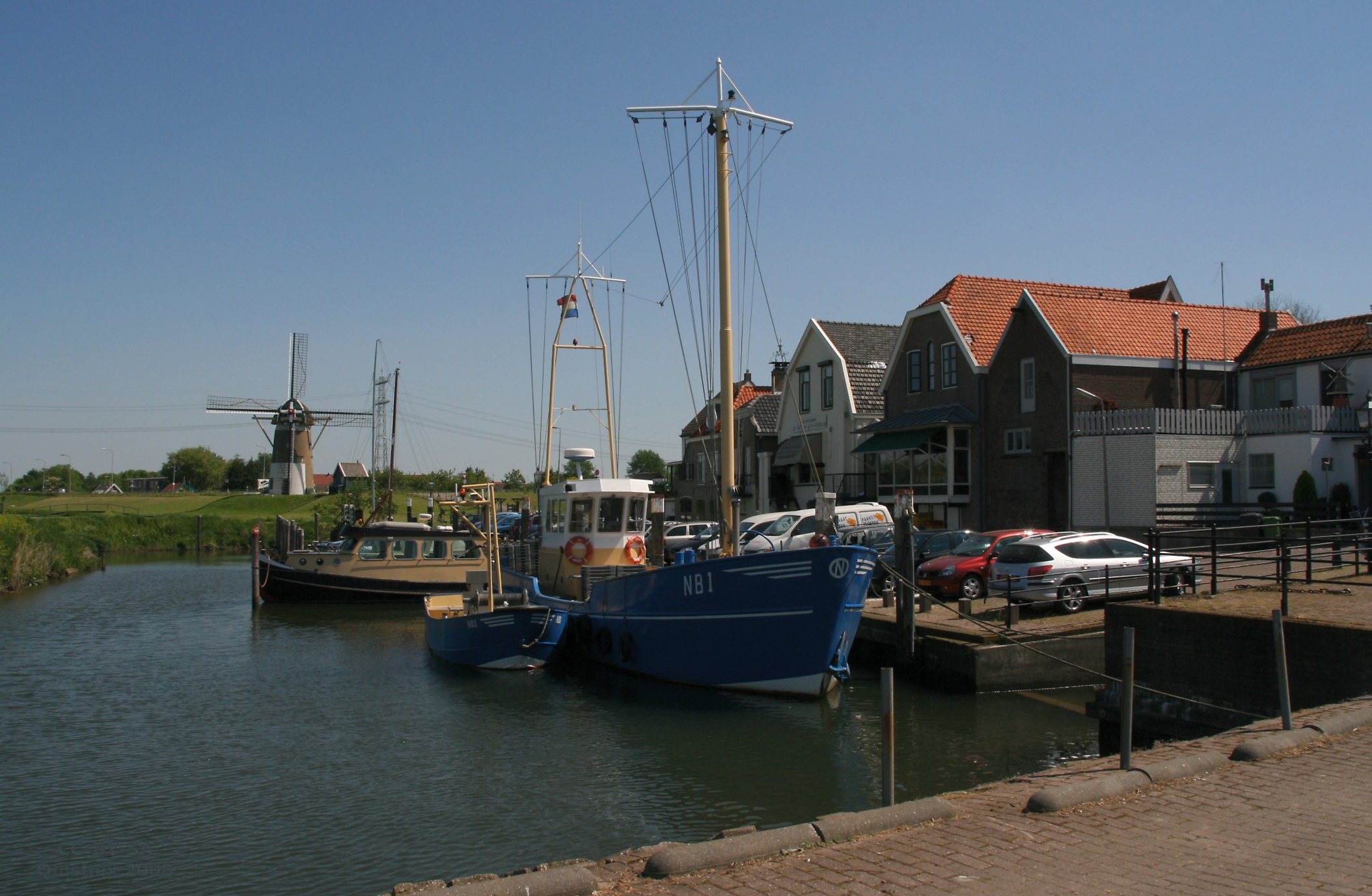
- Harbour of Nieuw-Beijerland

- Flag Coat of arms

- Location in South Holland
- Coordinates: 51°48′N 4°19′E
- Country: Netherlands
- Province: South Holland
- Established: 1 January 1984
- Merged: 2019

Area
  - Total: 100.47 km^{2} (38.79 sq mi)
  - Land: 77.26 km^{2} (29.83 sq mi)
  - Water: 23.21 km^{2} (8.96 sq mi)
- Elevation: 0 m (0 ft)

Population (January 2021)
  - Total: data missing
- Time zone: UTC+1 (CET)
  - Summer (DST): UTC+2 (CEST)
- Postcode: 3264–3267, 3284
- Area code: 0186
- Website: www.korendijk.nl

Korendijk (Dutch pronunciation: [ˈkoːrə(n)dɛik]) was a municipality in the western Netherlands, in the province of South Holland. The municipality covered an area of 100.47 km^{2} (38.79 sq mi) of which 23.21 km^{2} (8.96 sq mi) was water.

With the municipal reorganization of the Hoeksche Waard on 1 January 1984, the municipality of Korendijk was formed out of the former municipalities of Goudswaard, Nieuw-Beijerland, Piershil (location of town hall), Zuid-Beijerland, and the island Tiengemeten. In addition to these villages, it also had the population centres Nieuwendijk and Zuidzijde. On 1 January 2019, it merged into the municipality of Hoeksche Waard.

The municipality of Korendijk was bordered on the southside by the Haringvliet estuary, on the westside by the Spui River, and by the municipalities Oud-Beijerland and Cromstrijen to the north and east.

== Topography ==
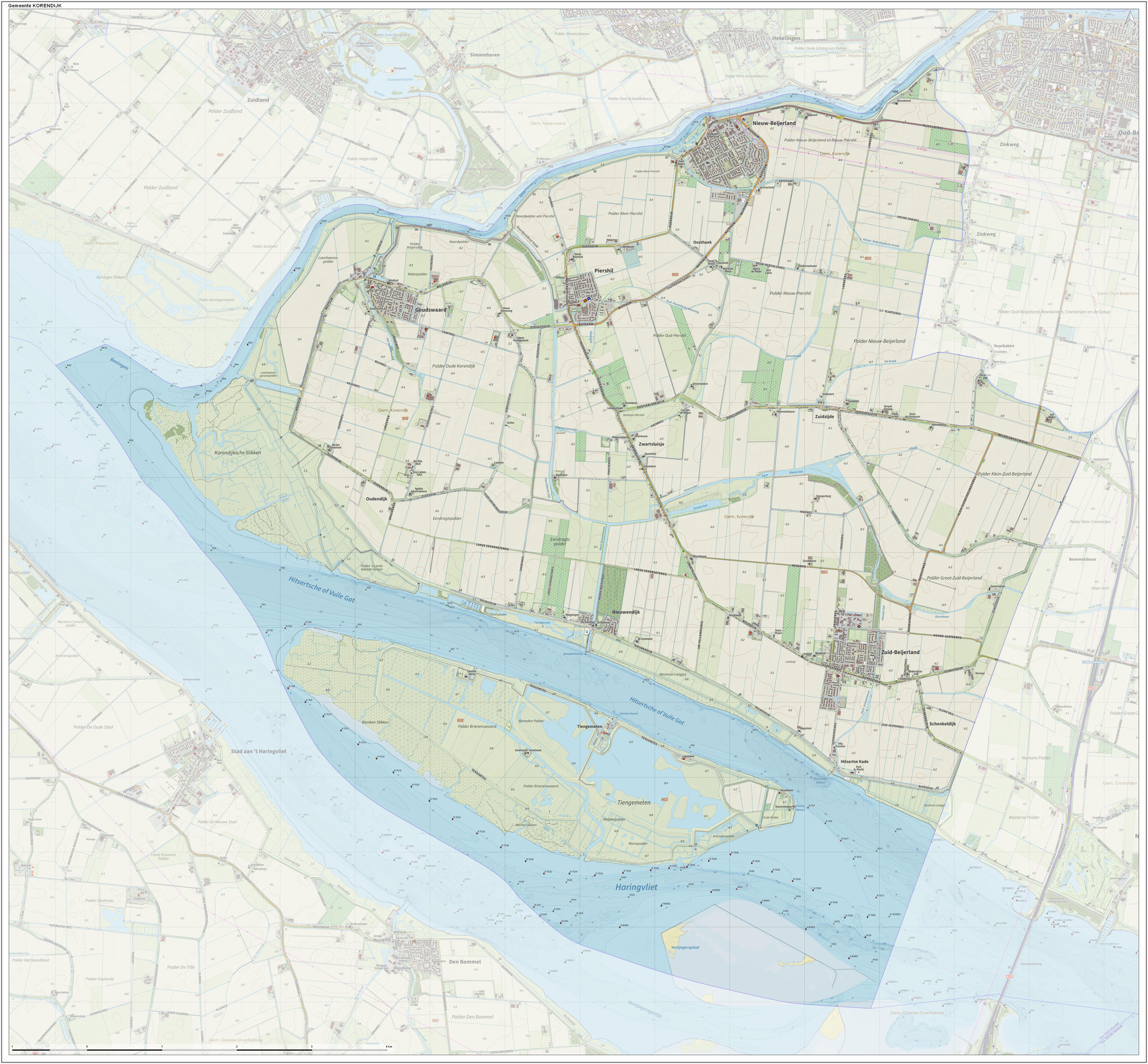

Dutch Topographic map of the municipality of Korendijk, June 2015
