= Zuidzijde truck accident =

Fatal collision in South Holland, Netherlands

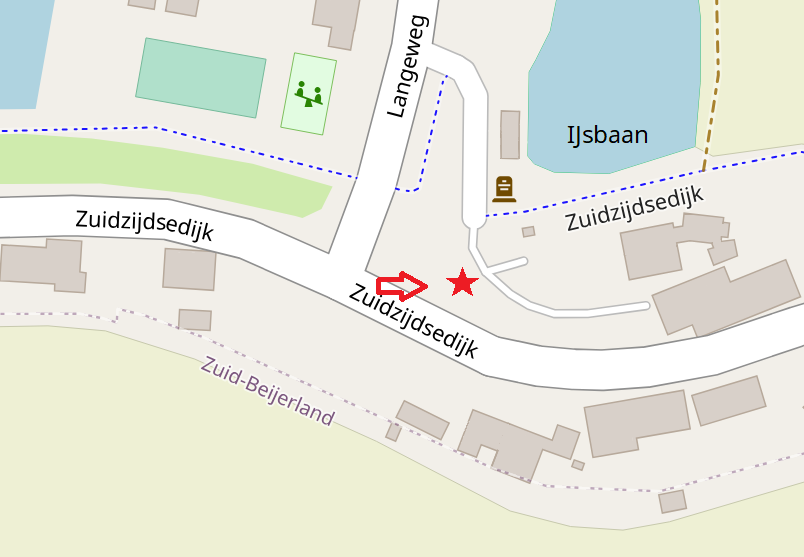
- Location of the accident in Zuidzijde
- Date: 27 August 2022
- Time: 09:54 (CET (UTC+2))
- Location: Zuidzijde, Hoeksche Waard, South Holland, Netherlands; 51°46′53.7″N 4°21′42.1″E
- Type: Traffic collision
- Deaths: 7
- Injuries: 7

On 27 Augustus 2022 a truck drove off a dike in the hamlet Zuidzijde near the village Nieuw-Beijerland in the Dutch municipality Hoeksche Waard. This accident caused seven deaths and seven injuries.

== Accident ==
Under the dike there was a barbecue party by a local ice skating club at the time, near their outdoor skating rink (which was not frozen over as it was summer). The truck (from a Spanish transport company) travelled on the Zuidzijdsedijk and then drove off the dike into a pop up canopy filled with people. It was there where the seven fatal casualties fell. Before the accident the truck stood still on the T junction between the Zuidzijdsedijk and the Langeweg and appeared to take a wide turn to the latter.

== Casualties ==
Seven people died in the accident and there were seven injuries. Originally there had been six fatal casualties counted but later an unborn baby was counted as a victim as well.

== Inquiry ==
During an inquiry into the accident it was determined that the Spanish driver had traces of cocaine in his blood.
