= Hoeksche Waard =

Island in South Holland, Netherlands

Coordinates: 51.78°N 4.35°E

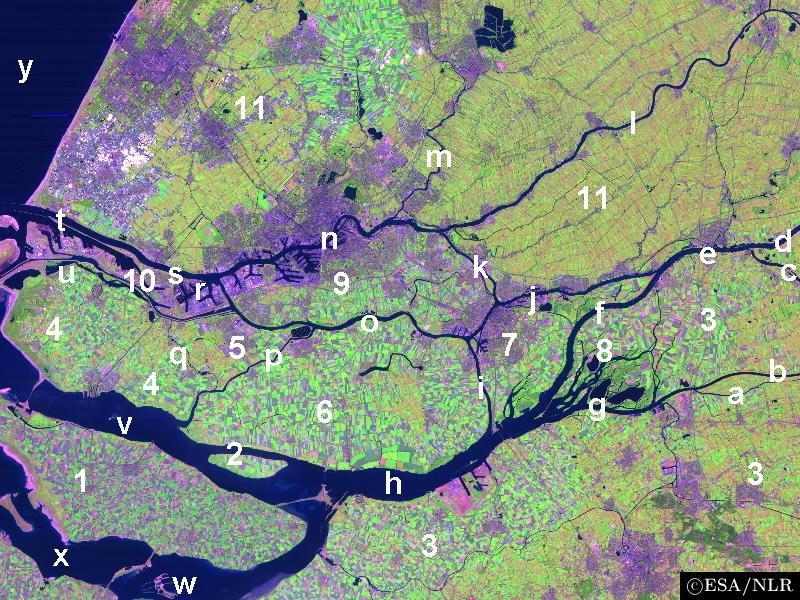
Satellite image of the Rhine–Meuse–Scheldt delta, showing the island of Hoekse Waard (6)

The Hoekse Waard (Dutch pronunciation: [ˈɦuksə ˈʋaːrt]; pre-1947 spelling: Hoeksche Waard) is an island between the Oude Maas, Dordtsche Kil, Hollands Diep, Haringvliet and Spui rivers in the province of South Holland in the Netherlands. The island, part of the namesake municipality of Hoeksche Waard, is a mostly agricultural region, south of the outskirts of Rotterdam. The Hoeksche Waard consists of reclaimed land (polders): after the Saint Elisabeth flood of 1421 most of the area was flooded. The land has been reclaimed gradually in the following centuries.

== Former municipalities ==
The Hoeksche Waard formerly consisted of the following municipalities until these were merged on 1 January 2019:

- Binnenmaas (villages Blaaksedijk, Heinenoord, Goidschalxoord, Maasdam, Mijnsheerenland, Puttershoek, Westmaas and 's-Gravendeel)
- Cromstrijen (villages Klaaswaal and Numansdorp)
- Korendijk (villages Goudswaard, Nieuw-Beijerland, Piershil and Zuid-Beijerland, and the island of Tiengemeten)
- Oud-Beijerland
- Strijen (villages Cillaarshoek, Mookhoek, Strijen and Strijensas)

== Surrounding waters ==
The Hoeksche Waard is separated:

- from IJsselmonde island on the north by the Oude Maas (tunnel)
- from Voorne-Putten island on the west by the Spui (ferry)
- from the island of Dordrecht on the east by the Dordtsche Kil (tunnel)
- from Goeree-Overflakkee island on the southwest by the Haringvliet (bridge)
- from the Province of North Brabant on the southeast by the Hollands Diep (bridge)
