= Tiengemeten =

- Statistical area
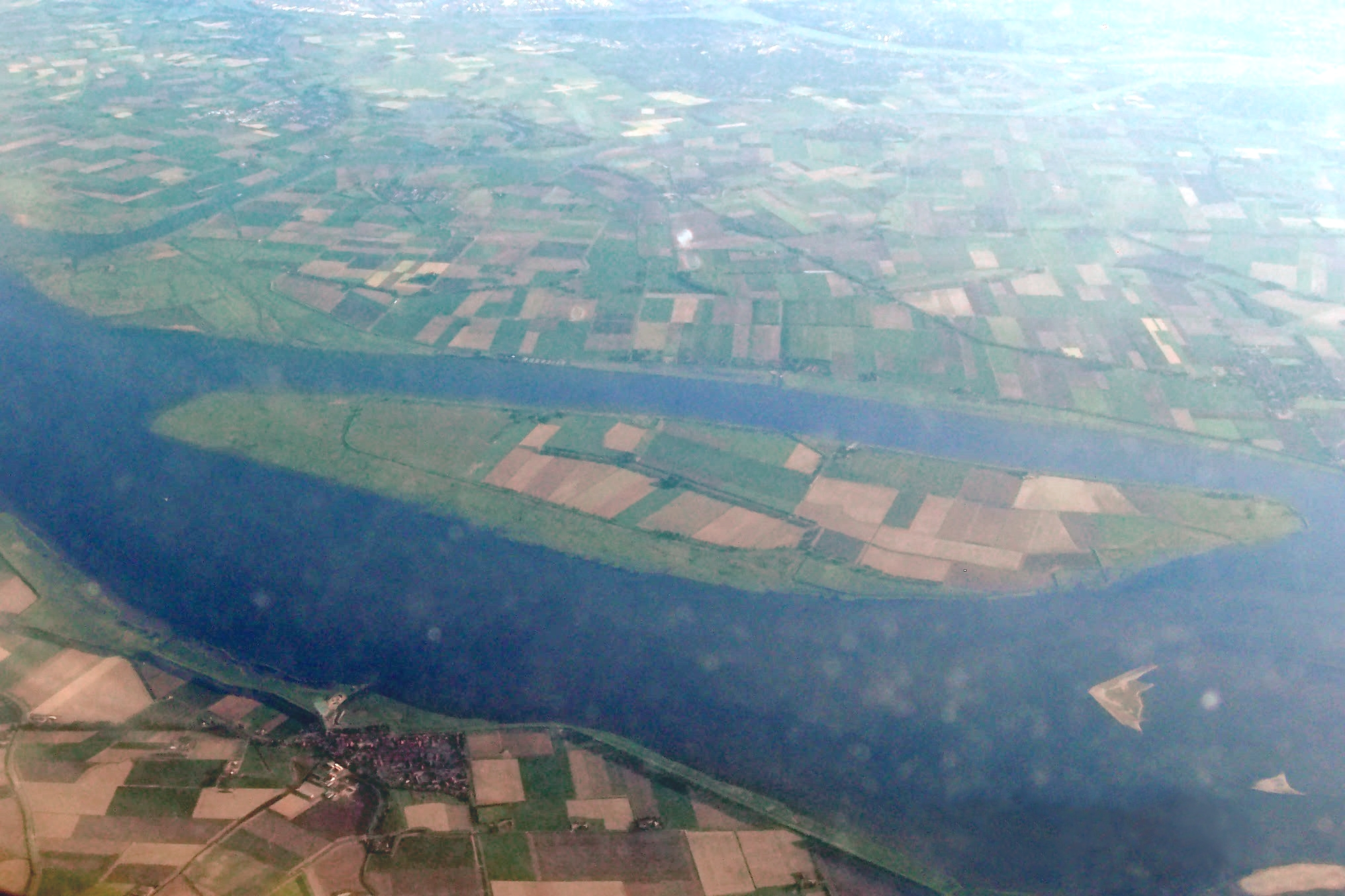

- Flag Coat of arms

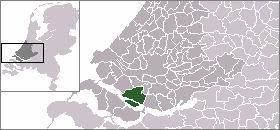

- The former hamlet (dark red) and the statistical district (light green) of Tiengemeten in the former municipality of Korendijk.
- Coordinates: 51°44′N 4°19′E
- Country: Netherlands
- Province: South Holland
- Municipality: Hoeksche Waard

Population (January 1, 2005)
  - Total: 10
- Time zone: UTC+1 (CET)
  - Summer (DST): UTC+2 (CEST)

Tiengemeten is an island in the Dutch province of South Holland. It is a part of the municipality of Hoeksche Waard and lies about 11 km (7 mi) south of Spijkenisse. Before 1984 the island was administratively split between Goudswaard and Zuid-Beijerland, and until 2019 it was part of the municipality of Korendijk.

The name Tiengemeten refers to an ancient area measurement; one gemet is comparable with one acre so the name means ten-acre island. Ten gemets would be about 100 by 400 metres (330 by 1,310 feet), while the island is actually about 7 km (4 mi) long and 2 km (1 mi) across at its widest.

The statistical area "Tiengemeten" had a population of around 10 until 2007. On 10 May 2007, the island was officially allowed to revert to its natural state after its inhabitants were relocated.

The Rien Poortvliet museum is located on the island.
