= Goudswaard =

- Village
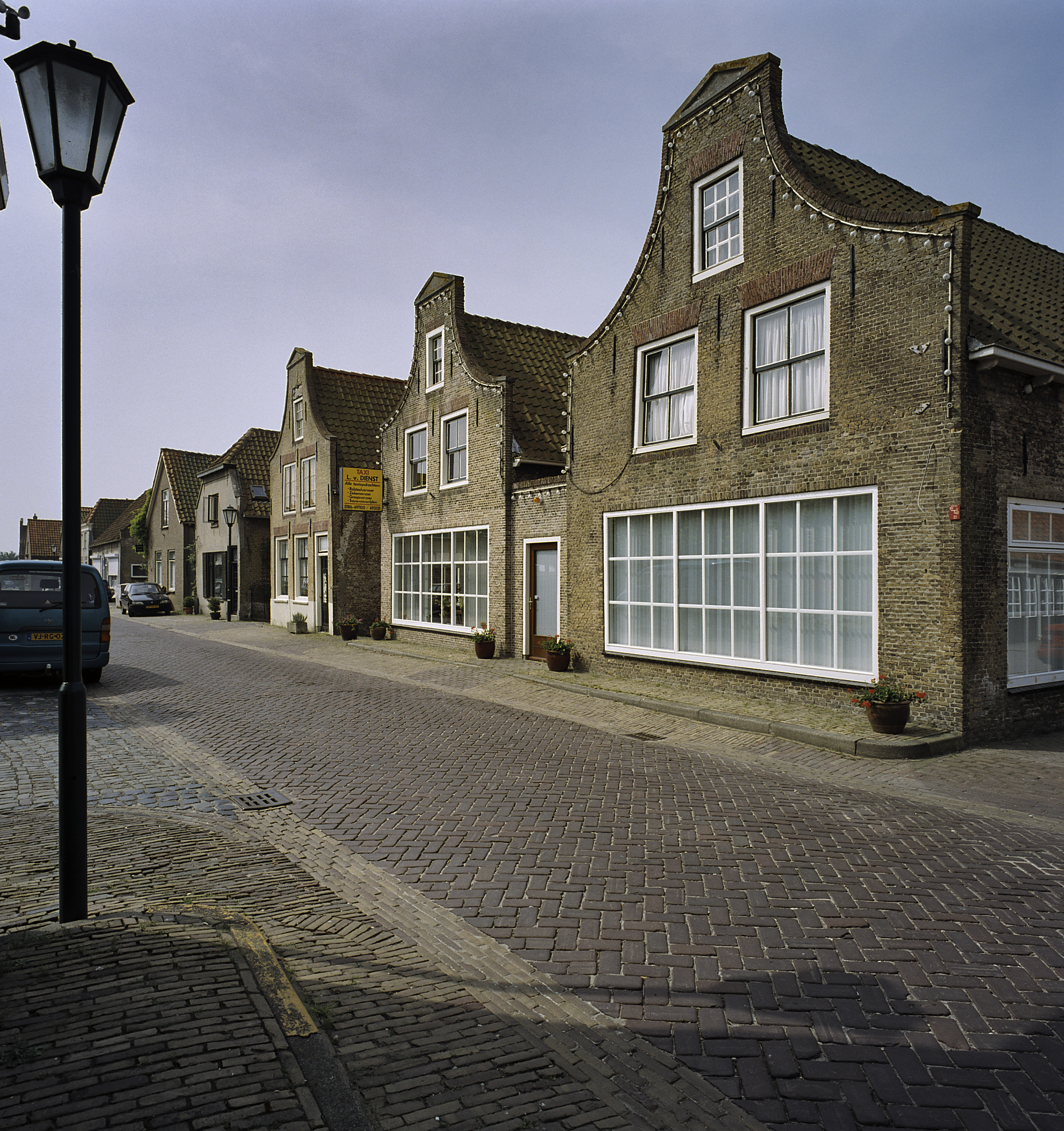
- Dorpsstraat 32-34

- Flag Coat of arms

- Location in the province of South Holland in the Netherlands Location in the Netherlands
- Coordinates: 51°48′N 4°17′E
- Country: Netherlands
- Province: South Holland
- Municipality: Hoeksche Waard

Area
  - Total: 24.76 km^{2} (9.56 sq mi)
- Elevation: 0.2 m (0.66 ft)

Population (2021)
  - Total: 2,020
  - Density: 81.6/km^{2} (211/sq mi)
- Time zone: UTC+1 (CET)
  - Summer (DST): UTC+2 (CEST)
- Postal code: 3267
- Dialing code: 0186

Goudswaard is a village in the Dutch province of South Holland, located on the westernmost tip of the Hoeksche Waard, approximately 6 km south-west of Spijkenisse. Goudswaard was a separate municipality from 1817 until 1984, when it was merged with Nieuw-Beijerland, Zuid-Beijerland and Piershil to form the municipality of Korendijk.

== History ==
The village was first mentioned in 1246 as "terram que Corendich dicitur". In 1439, the polder Oud Korendijk was created, however a settlement already existed outside the dike. The village itself was, and still is, sometimes known as Korendijk. The etymology is unclear. Goudswaard is a dike village.

The Dutch Reformed church is an aisleless church which was probably built in 1721 as a replacement of the 1441 church. The village houses a flour mill named Windlust which was built in 1694 and restored around 1961.

Goudwaard was home to 497 people in 1840. It was connected to Rotterdam by tram from 1903 to 1956. It was an independent municipality until 1984 when it was merged into Korendijk. In 2019, it became part of the municipality of Hoeksche Waard.

== Gallery ==
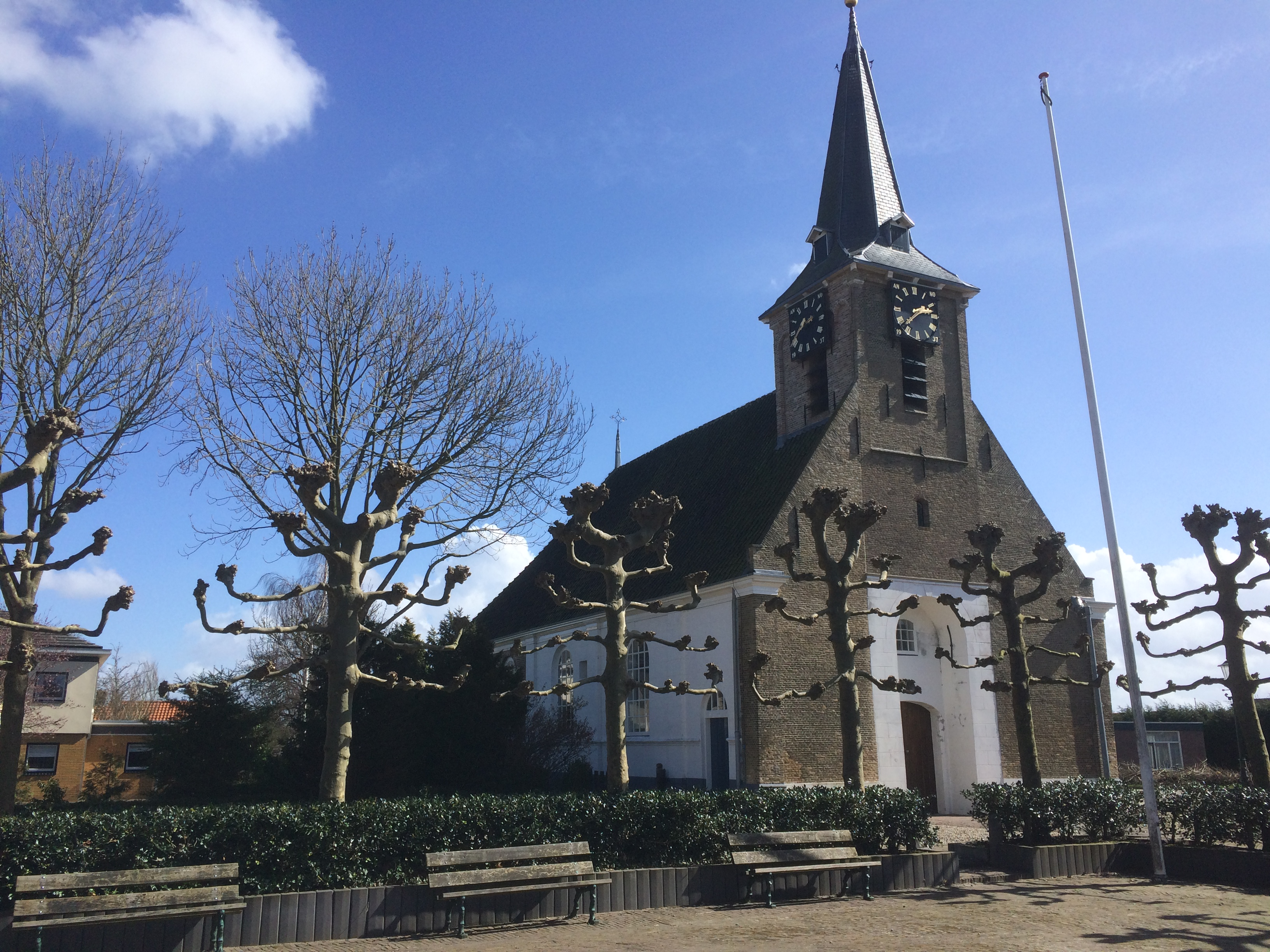
Dutch Reformed church

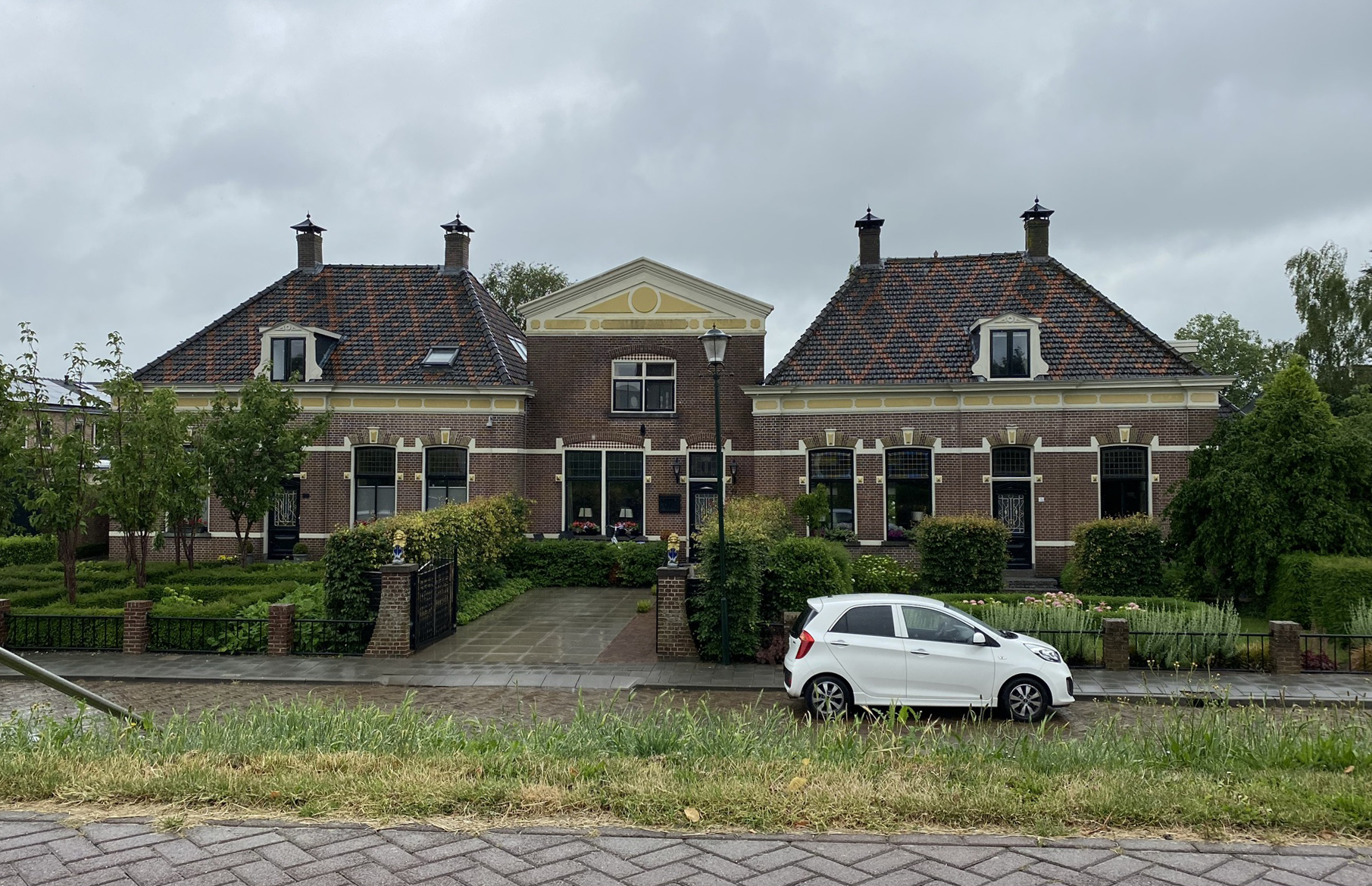
Former town hall

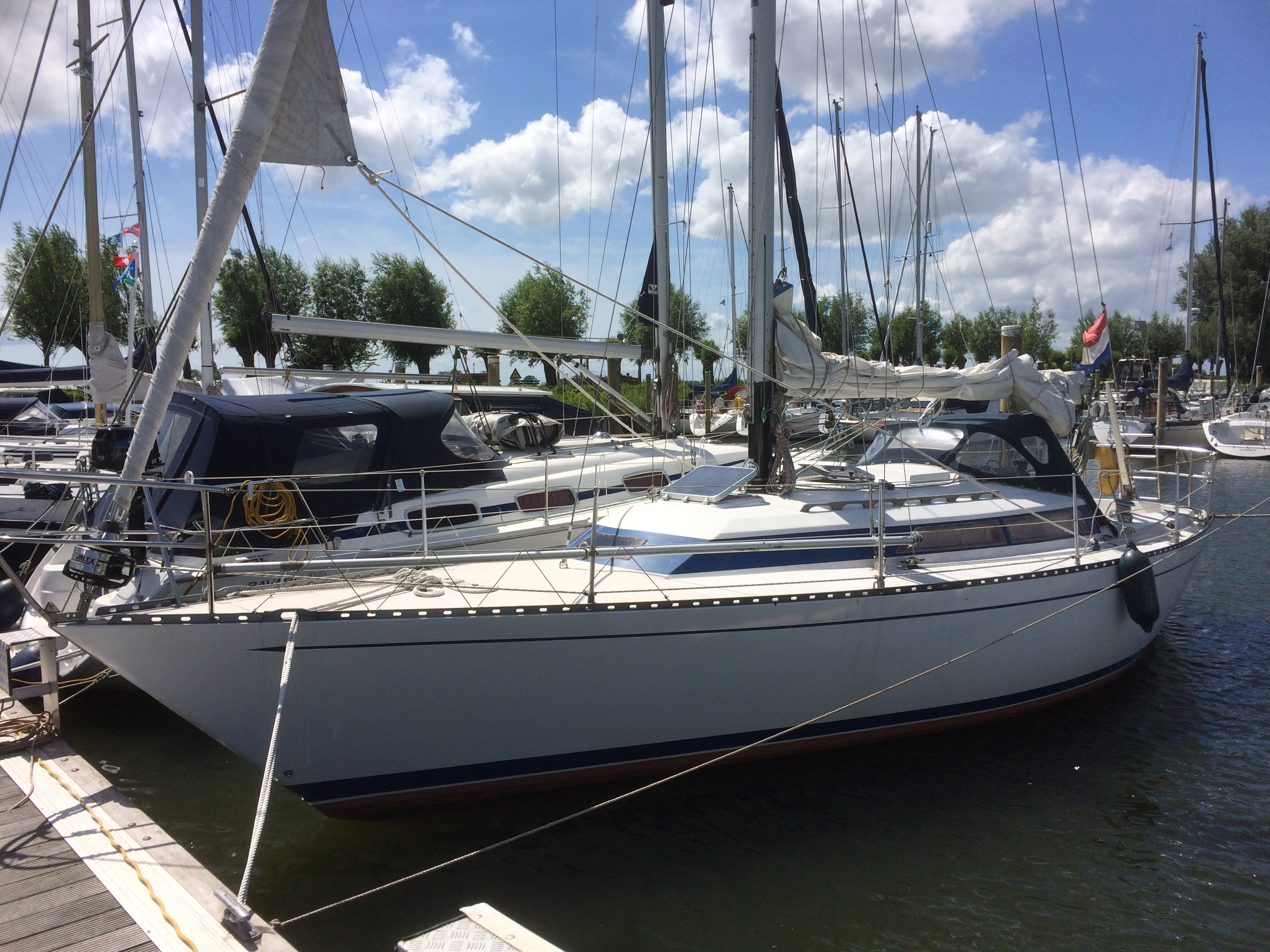
The harbour of Goudwaard

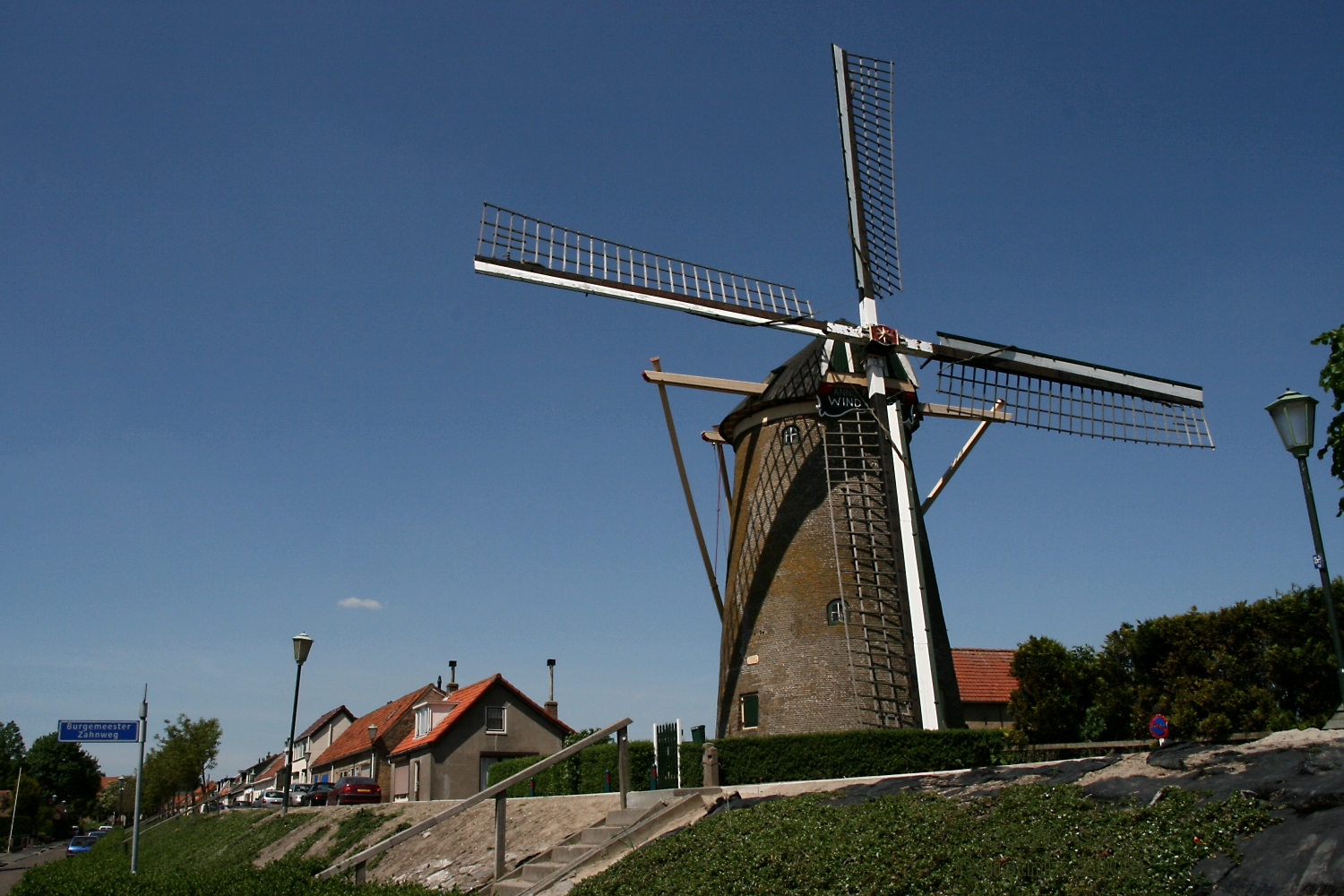
Windmill Windlust
