= Cromstrijen =

- Former municipality
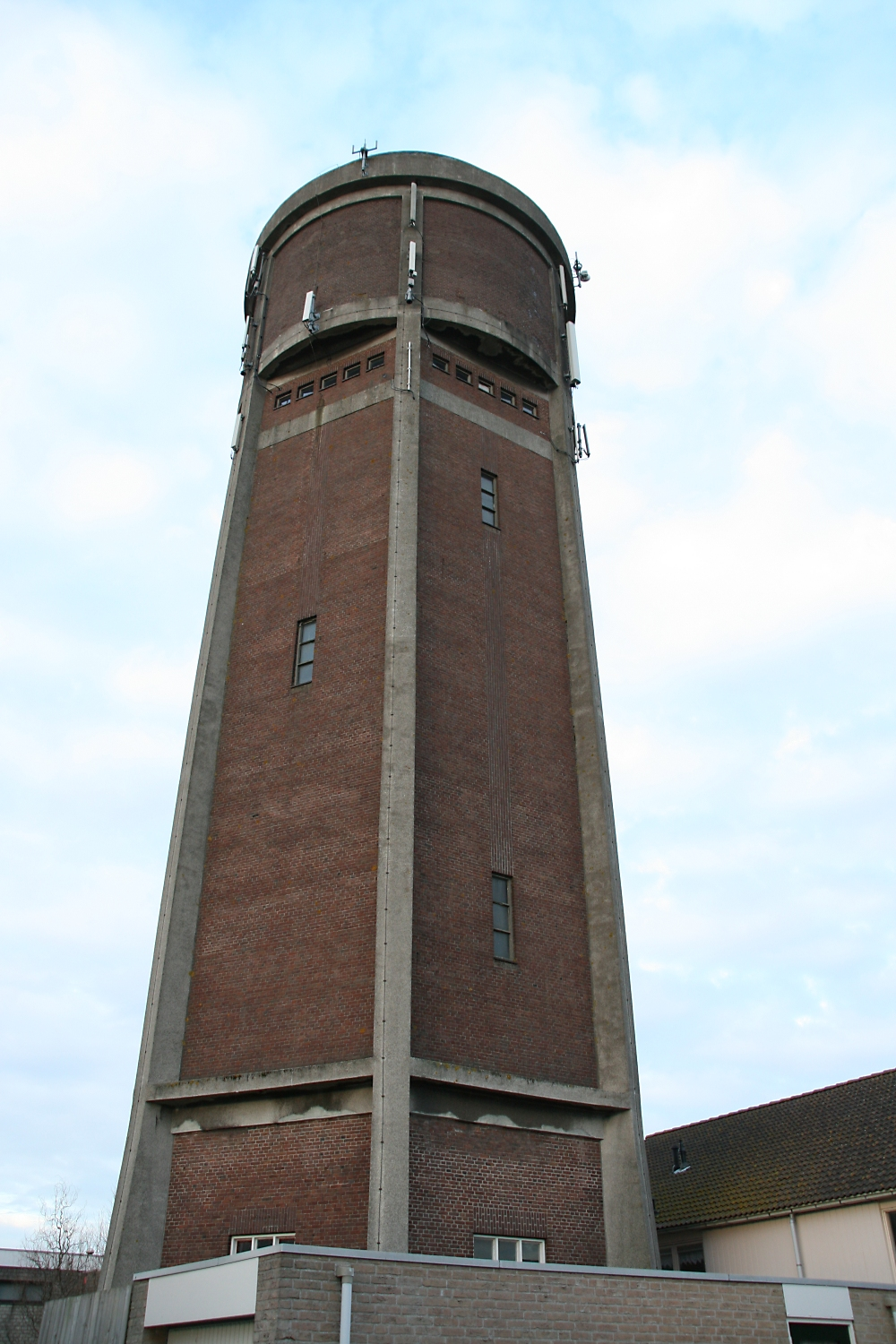
- Water tower in Klaaswaal

- Flag Coat of arms

- Location in South Holland
- Coordinates: 51°44′N 4°26′E
- Country: Netherlands
- Province: South Holland
- Established: 1 January 1984
- Merged: 2019

Area
  - Total: 70.33 km^{2} (27.15 sq mi)
  - Land: 54.37 km^{2} (20.99 sq mi)
  - Water: 15.96 km^{2} (6.16 sq mi)
- Elevation: 0 m (0 ft)

Population (January 2021)
  - Total: data missing
- Time zone: UTC+1 (CET)
  - Summer (DST): UTC+2 (CEST)
- Postcode: 3280–3281, 3286
- Area code: 0186
- Website: www.cromstrijen.nl

Cromstrijen (Dutch: [krɔmˈstrɛiə(n)]; Cromstrien in local dialect) was a municipality on the Hoeksche Waard Island in the western Netherlands, in the province of South Holland. The municipality covers an area of 70.33 km^{2} (27.15 sq mi) of which 15.96 km^{2} (6.16 sq mi) is water. It was formed on 1 January 1984, when the municipalities on the Hoeksche Waard were merged into larger municipalities. On 1 January 2019 it was merged with the municipalities of Binnenmaas, Korendijk, Oud-Beijerland, and Strijen to form the municipality of Hoeksche Waard.

The municipality of Cromstrijen consists of the communities Klaaswaal and Numansdorp (townhall).

Its population was data missing in 2021.

== Topography ==
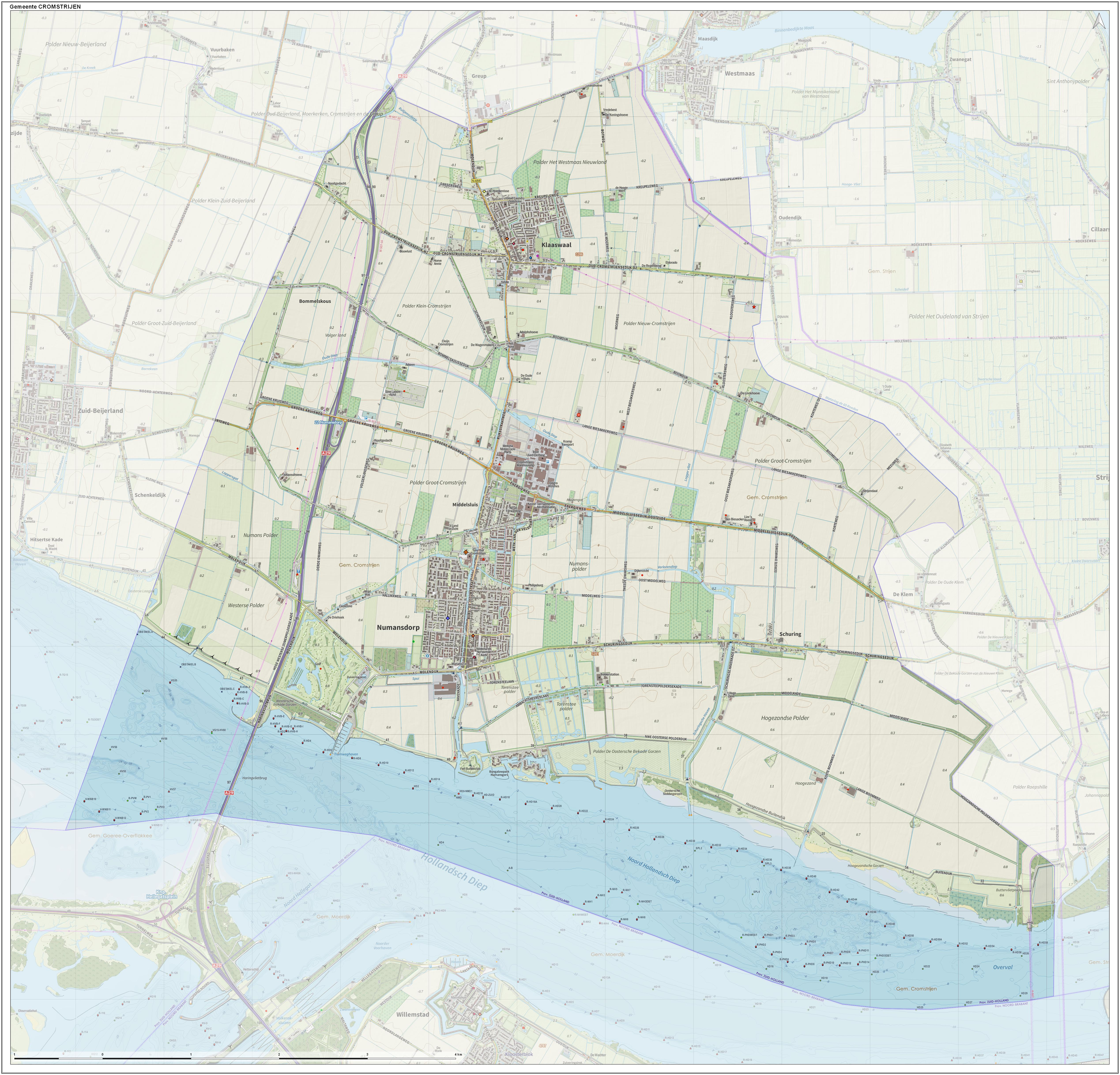

Dutch topographic map of the municipality of Cromstrijen, June 2015
