= Vuurbaken =

- Hamlet
- Location in the province of South Holland in the Netherlands Location in the Netherlands
- Coordinates: 51°47′14″N 4°23′37″E
- Country: Netherlands
- Province: South Holland
- Municipality: Hoeksche Waard

Vuurbaken is a hamlet in the Dutch province of South Holland and is part of the municipality of Hoeksche Waard. It lies to the south of Oud-Beijerland and about 1 km from Zinkweg.

Vuurbaken is not a statistical entity, and considered part of Oud-Beijerland and Nieuw-Beijerland. It has no place name signs, and consists of about 30 houses.
