= Numansdorp =

- Town
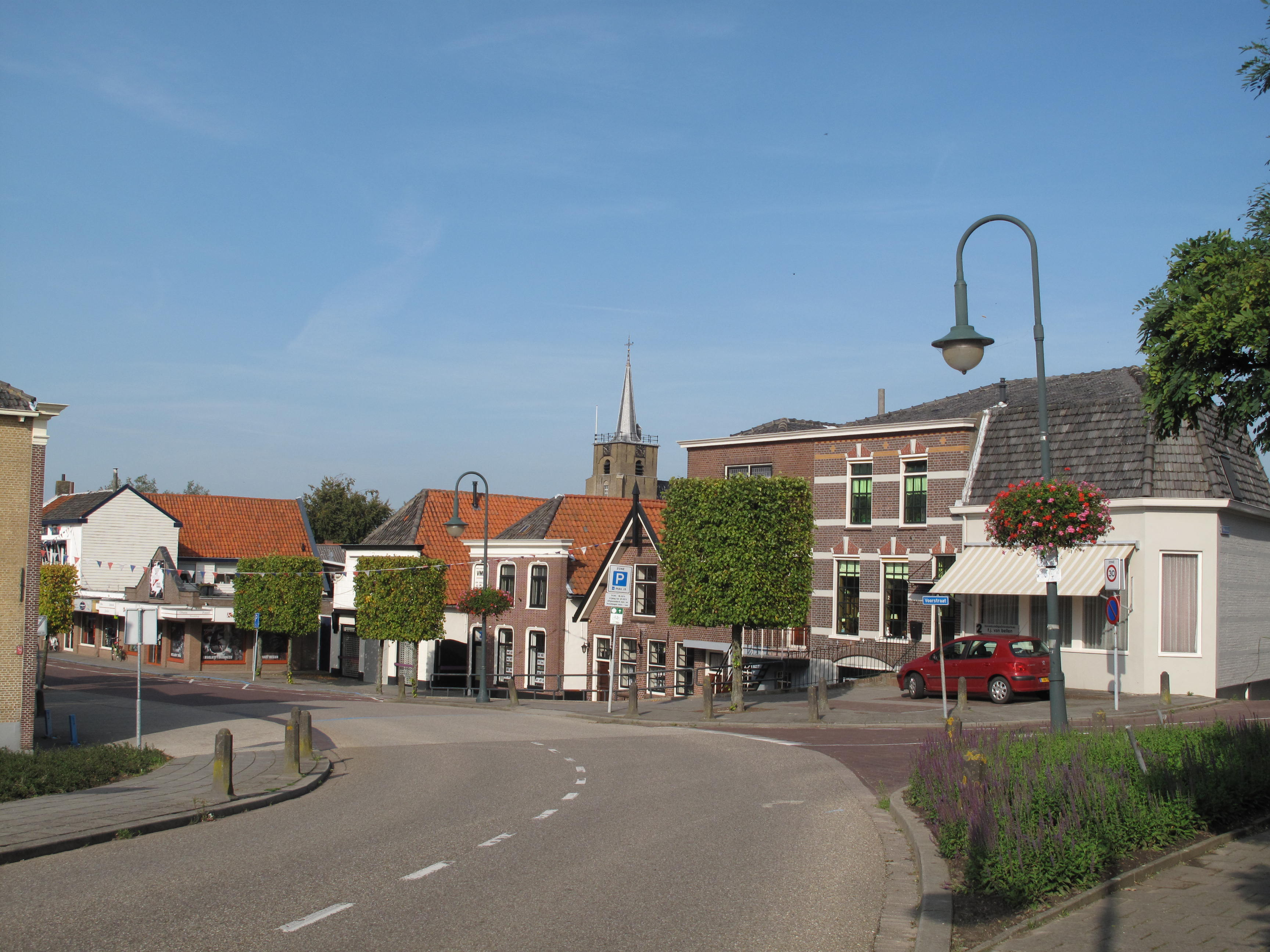
- View on Numansdorp from the Molendijk

- Flag Coat of arms

- Location in the province of South Holland in the Netherlands Location in the Netherlands
- Coordinates: 51°43′59″N 4°26′17″E
- Country: Netherlands
- Province: South Holland
- Municipality: Hoeksche Waard

Area
  - Total: 39.88 km^{2} (15.40 sq mi)
- Elevation: 0.2 m (0.66 ft)

Population (2021)
  - Total: 9,030
  - Density: 226/km^{2} (586/sq mi)
- Time zone: UTC+1 (CET)
  - Summer (DST): UTC+2 (CEST)
- Postal code: 3281
- Dialing code: 0186

Numansdorp is a town and former municipality in the province South Holland in the Netherlands and is located on the island Hoeksche Waard near the Hollands Diep. On 1 January 1984, the municipalities Numansdorp and Klaaswaal were merged into one municipality called Cromstrijen. Cromstrijen was merged into the new municipality Hoeksche Waard in January 2019.

== History ==
Numansdorp was founded in 1642. The village was built in the Numanspolder. It took a while till the embankment of this polder was started. The reason for the delay was a disagreement between the Lords of Cromstrijen and the owners of Zuid-Beijerland. When the founding of the village had finally taken place, it still didn't have an official name, even though the locals called it Buitensluis.

In a meeting it was decided to call the village "Village of Cromstrijen" (Dorp van Cromstrijen). But Dijkgraaf Vos, the chairman of the meeting, believed the village should me named after the first Ambachtsheer, Gerard Numan.

The first buildings of the village were built around the drainage sluice at the Numanspolderdijk (now called Molendijk) and from there the town spread along the Binnenhaven. The main street, the Voorstraat, was expanded with several crossing streets. In 1647, at the end of one of those crossing streets called the Kerkstraat, the "Reformed Church" (Hervormde Kerk) was built.

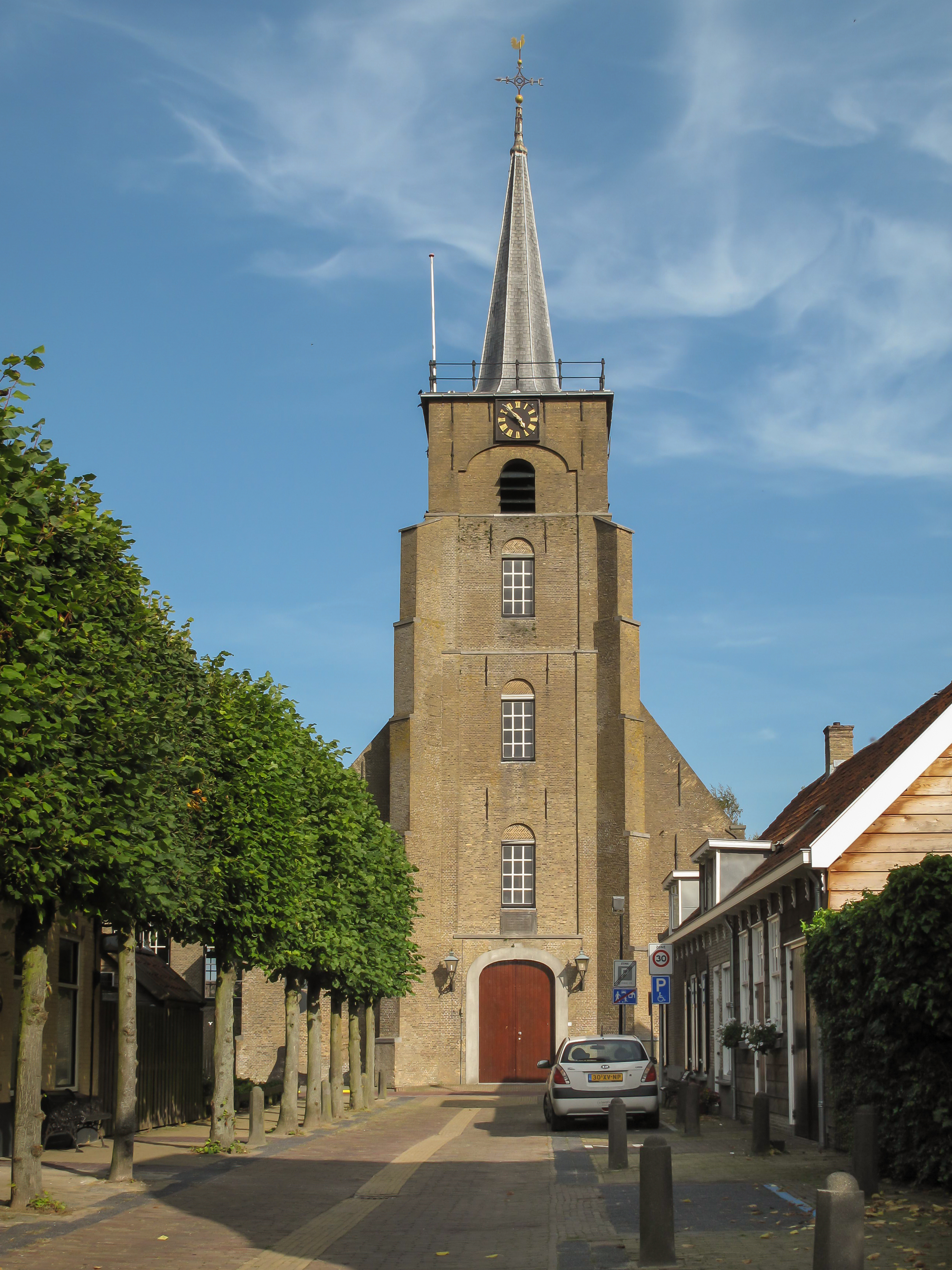
Numansdorp, Church

At the change of 19th century, more buildings were built along the East side of the Voorstraat and several streets crossing it.

The drainage sluice was till 1662 made of wood, its successor was made of stone. In 1912 the sluice was replaced by a diesel-run pumping station and in 1942 by one that ran on electricity.

There is a sluice door in the sea dike of the Torensteepolder. It originated from before 1970, when the Haringvliet and Volkerak were still open and there were still tides in the Hollands Diep. The Molendijk had a sluice to the Binnenhaven called Buitensluis. From there the water runs to Klaaswaal. The Middelsluissedijk 1625 had one to the polder Groot-Cromstrijen, also known as Middelsluis (also a village), and the Boomdijk had one for the polder Klein-Cromstrijen called the Oude sluis.

=== Fort Buitensluis ===
In 1793 an earthen fort was built next to the harbour of Numansdorp. The purpose of this fort was to keep an eye on the shipping between the Volkerak and Hollands Diep. In the same year, France attacked the Austrian Netherlands. Thanks to the Battle of Neerwinden the Austrian Netherlands remain in Austrian hands. In 1795 the Batavian Republic starts.

In 1862, the second cabinet of Thorbecke, ordered to reinforce the fort. From 1874 on, the fort became a part of the Defence line of the Hollands Diep and the Volkerak. In 1915 the fort was reinforced for a second time, this time with reinforced concrete.

=== Second World War ===
On 12 May 1940 the soldiers of the fort received the command to go to Westmaas where they were to secure the Barendrechtse brug (Bridge of Barendrecht). On 13 May that year the soldiers left the artillery and moved on to Brielle and next to The Hague.

Frits Philips fled from Eindhoven on 14 May 1940 and was bombed near Numansdorp. Unharmed he managed to reach The Hague.

In September 1944 the Germans moved the people of Numansdorp, because they wanted to flood the area as a defence against the Allies. In May 1945 they were allowed back in the village.

=== North Sea flood of 1953 ===
In the night of 31 January and morning of 1 February 1953 large parts of Zeeland, the islands of South Holland and some parts of North Brabant were flooded, due to a combination of high tide and a strong northwestern storm which caused many dikes to break.

A result of the flood was the death of 56 inhabitants of the area, which made the Numansdorp the village with the highest number on the Hoeksche Waard. The majority of them, 54, lived in the agricultural area Ambachtsheerlijkheid Cromstrijen not far from the village. The last 3 bodies were found in June that year. Apart from the loss of human lives, about 500 horses, cows, pigs and many poultry were lost. 136 farms and homes were completely ruined, about 850 homes had water damage and more than 2,800 persons were evacuated. Because the fields had been flooded with salt water for 14 days, they couldn't be properly used for the rest of the year.
