= Nieuwendijk (disambiguation) =

Nieuwendijk can refer to the places:

- Nieuwendijk in North Brabant.
- Nieuwendijk (South Holland)
- Nieuwendijk, Amsterdam

Notable people with the surname Nieuwendijk:

- Pepijn van den Nieuwendijk (born 1970), Dutch painter and ceramist
- Dirk Nieuwendijk, Engineer

== See also ==
- Joe Nieuwendyk, Canadian ice hockey player
