= Klaaswaal =

- Village
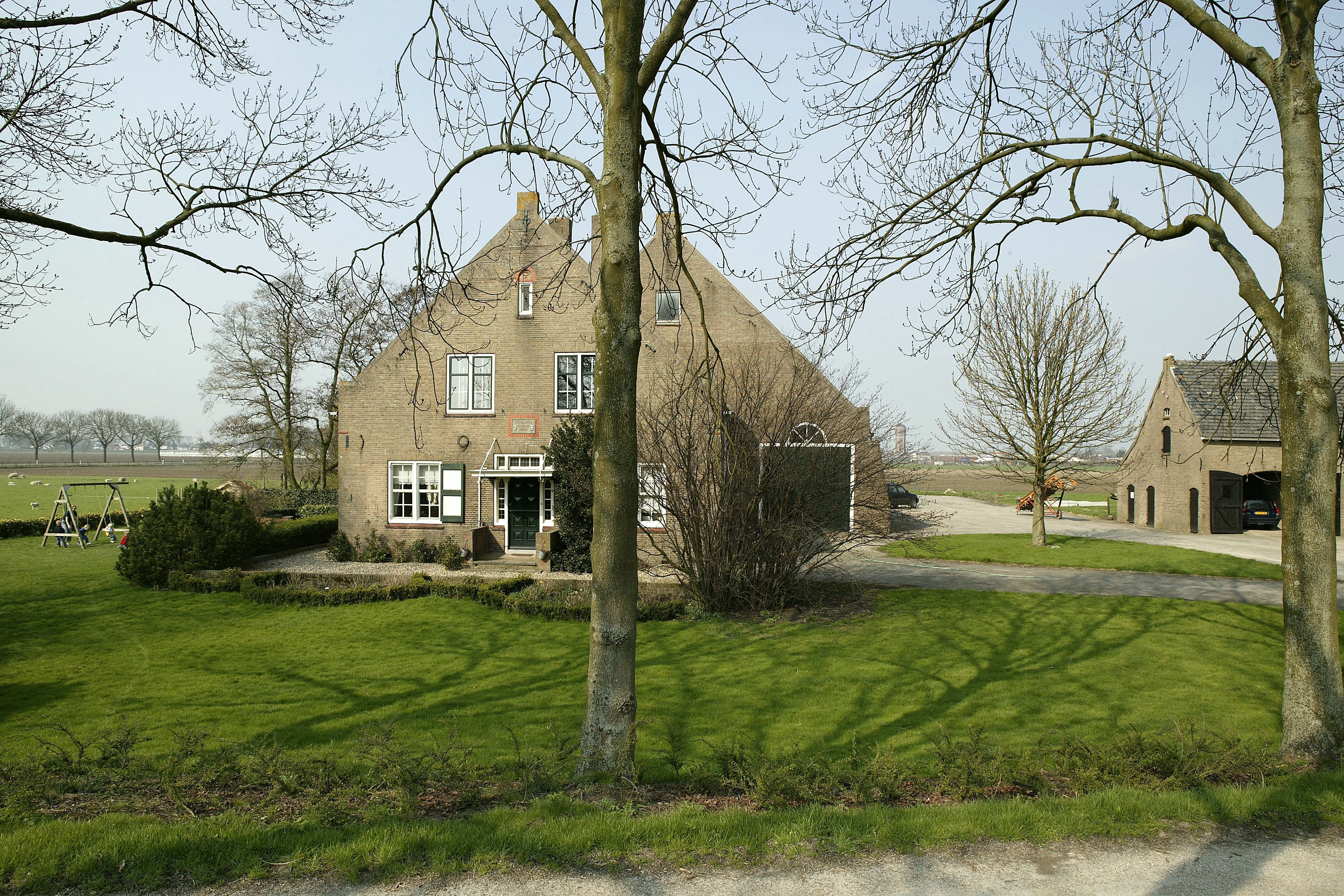
- Farm in Klaaswaal

- Location in the province of South Holland in the Netherlands Location in the Netherlands
- Coordinates: 51°46′N 4°27′E
- Country: Netherlands
- Province: South Holland
- Municipality: Hoeksche Waard

Area
  - Total: 15.02 km^{2} (5.80 sq mi)
- Elevation: −0.3 m (−0.98 ft)

Population (2021)
  - Total: 4,175
  - Density: 278.0/km^{2} (719.9/sq mi)
- Time zone: UTC+1 (CET)
  - Summer (DST): UTC+2 (CEST)
- Postal code: 3286
- Dialing code: 0186

Klaaswaal is a village and former municipality in the Dutch province of South Holland. It is centrally located on one of the island Hoeksche Waard. Klaaswaal was a separate municipality until 1984, when it was merged with Numansdorp to form the municipality Cromstrijen.

== History ==
The village was first mentioned in 1555 as "Claes Wael", and means "pool after dike breach belonging to Claes (person)".

In 1539 embankment of the polder Het Westmaas Nieuwland was started. The lords reserved a part of the new land for the new to found village Claeswaal. The first buildings were built along the Voorstraat. At the end of this street, a church was built in 1566. Originally, it was built as a Catholic church, but the pastor of Strijen didn't want to come to the village as he considered the distance as too far. The community found a minister who was willing to hold the services, and therefore the services were of a Protestant nature.

The Dutch Reformed church is a single aisled church with slender tower from 1566. It was modified several through its history. The water tower is octagon tower made out of reinforced concrete and was built in 1929.

In 1602 the embankment of the Nieuw-Cromstrijense polder was finished. Since then, Klaaswaal doesn't have a connection with the Hollands Diep anymore.

Klaaswaal was home to 651 people in 1840. It was an independent municipality until 1984 when it was merged into Cromstrijen. In 2019, it became part of the municipality of Hoeksche Waard.

== Gallery ==
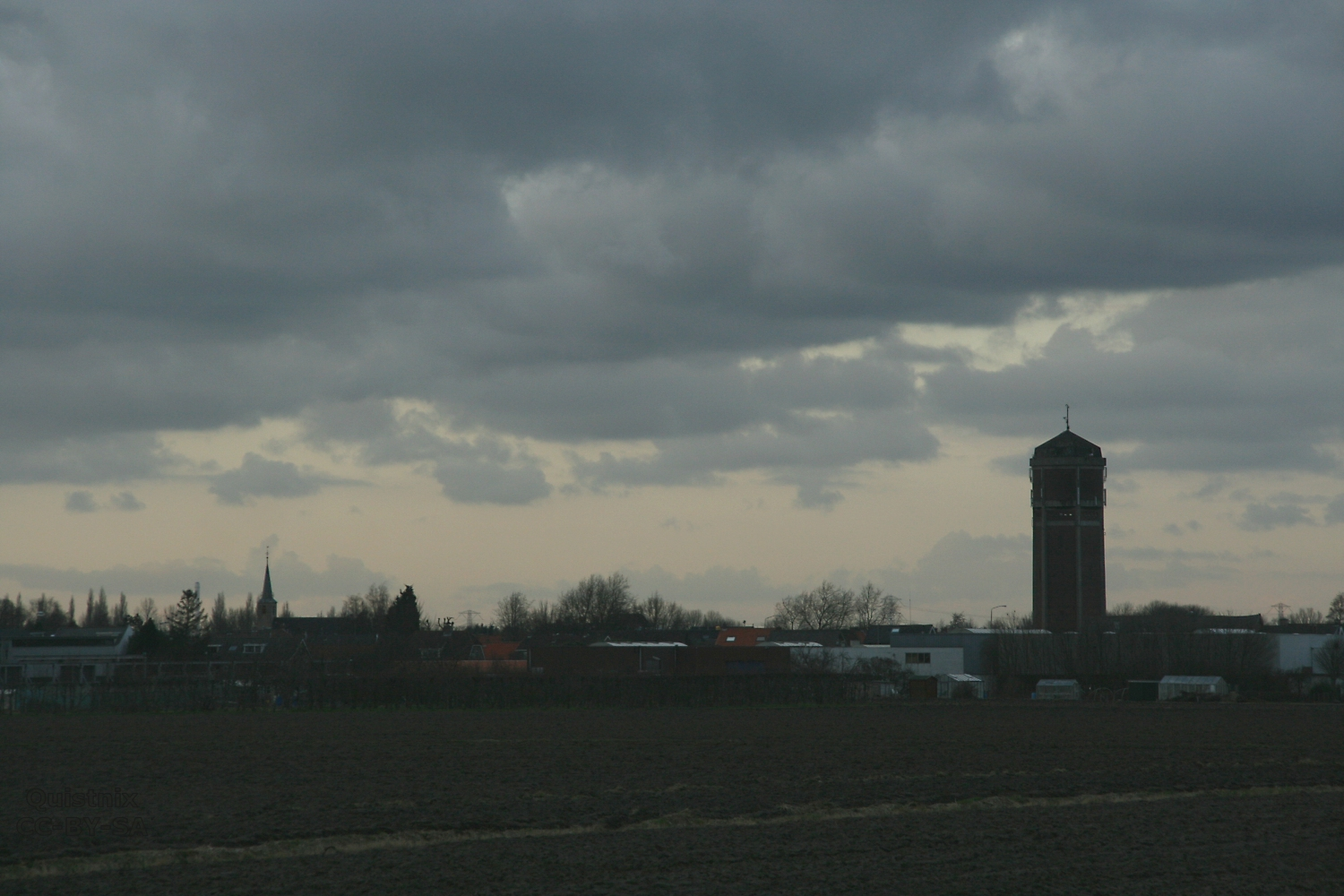
Klaaswaal, view of the village

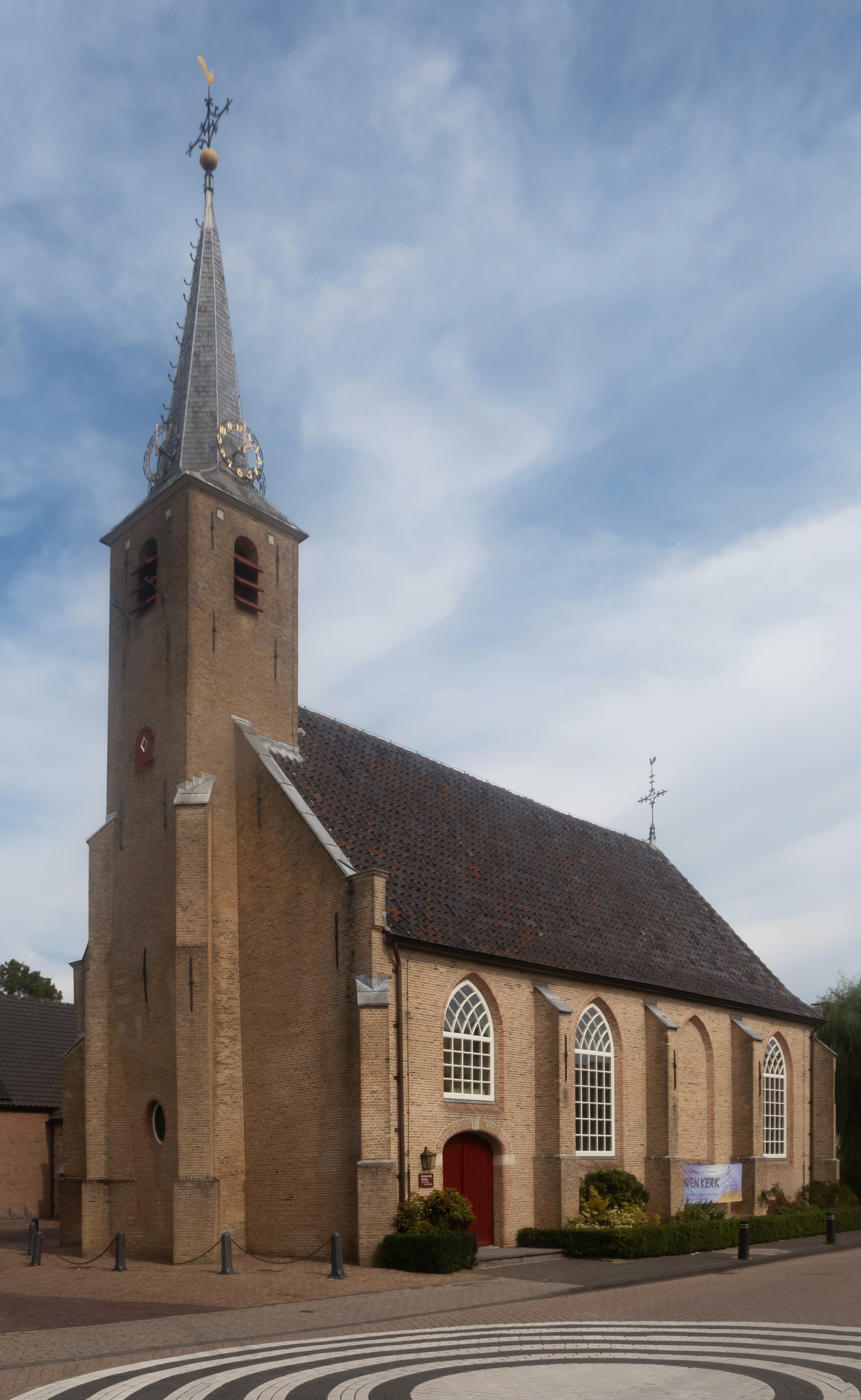
Reformed church
