= Nieuwendijk, South Holland =

Nieuwendijk
- Hamlet
- Location in the province of South Holland in the Netherlands Location in the Netherlands
- Coordinates: 51°45′16″N 4°19′5″E
- Country: Netherlands
- Province: South Holland
- Municipality: Hoeksche Waard
- Time zone: UTC+1 (CET)
  - Summer (DST): UTC+2 (CEST)

Nieuwendijk is a hamlet in the Dutch province of South Holland. It is a part of the municipality of Hoeksche Waard and lies about 9 km south of Spijkenisse.

Nieuwendijk was severely damaged during the North Sea flood of 1953, and 36 emergency houses were donated by Norway to the village. It has a little church, but it has been vacant since 2018.

Nieuwendijk is not a statistical entity, and considered part of Zuid-Beijerland and Goudswaard. It has no place name signs, and consists of about 150 houses.
