= Zuidzijde, Hoeksche Waard =

Zuidzijde
- Hamlet
- Location in the province of South Holland in the Netherlands Location in the Netherlands
- Coordinates: 51°46′52″N 4°21′51″E
- Country: Netherlands
- Province: South Holland
- Municipality: Hoeksche Waard
- Time zone: UTC+1 (CET)
  - Summer (DST): UTC+2 (CEST)

Zuidzijde is a hamlet in the Dutch province of South Holland. It is a part of the municipality of Hoeksche Waard and lies approximately 7 km (4 miles) south of Spijkenisse.

Zuidzijde is not a statistical entity, and considered part of Nieuw-Beijerland and Zuid-Beijerland. It has place name signs, and consists of about 100 houses.

On 27 August 2022 seven people died in Zuidzijde when a truck drove off a dike into a neighborhood party.
