= Spui (river) =

Small tidal river in South Holland, Netherlands

Coordinates: 51°48′44″N 4°19′3″E

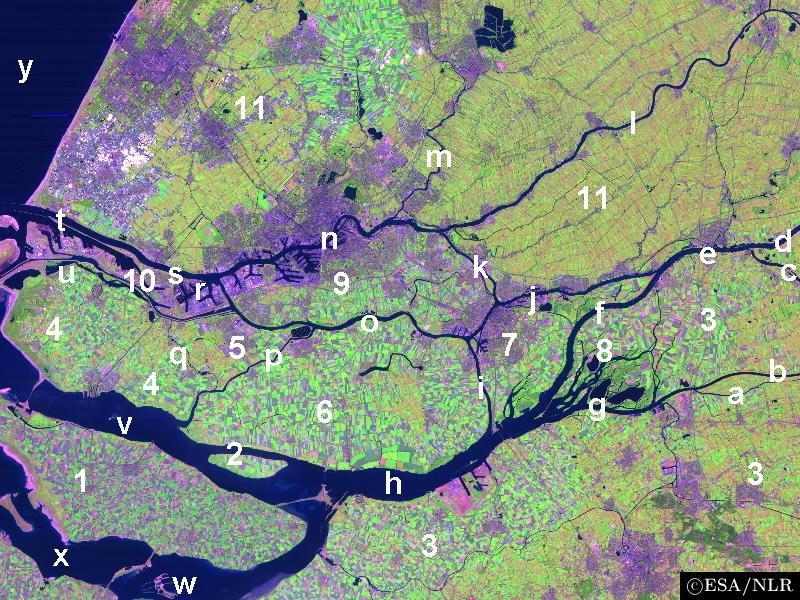
Satellite image of the northwest part of the Rhine-Meuse delta showing river Spui (p).

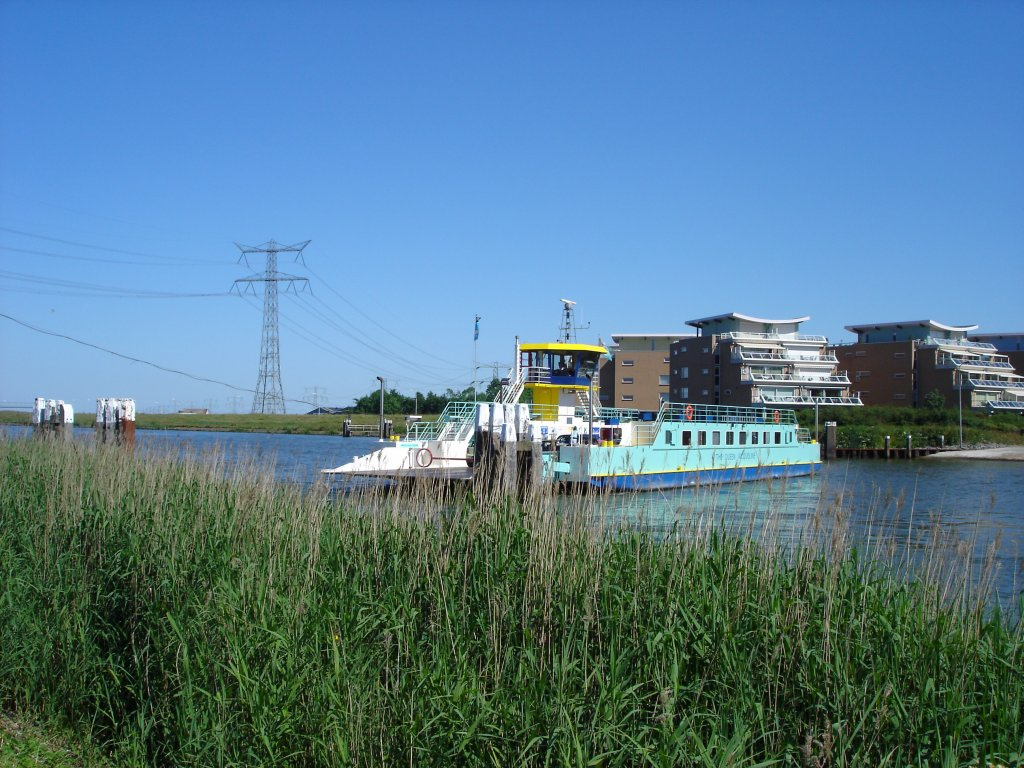
Ferry across the Spui at Nieuw-Beijerland.

The Spui is a small tidal river in South Holland in the Netherlands, connecting the river Oude Maas and the Haringvliet estuary, separating the islands of Voorne-Putten and Hoeksche Waard. Historically, it forked off the Oude Maas at the town of Oud-Beijerland to end in the Haringvliet, but as a (planned) result from the Delta Works, its flow has been reversed. The Spui emerged as a result of a levee breach during the All Saints' Flood of 1532, a storm surge that permanently altered the surrounding landscape.

There are no bridges or tunnels crossing the Spui, but there is a car ferry from Hekelingen (municipality Nissewaard) to Nieuw-Beijerland (municipality Hoeksche Waard), and a pedestrian and bicycle ferry between Oud-Beijerland and Rhoon (in Albrandswaard).
