= Piershil =

- Village
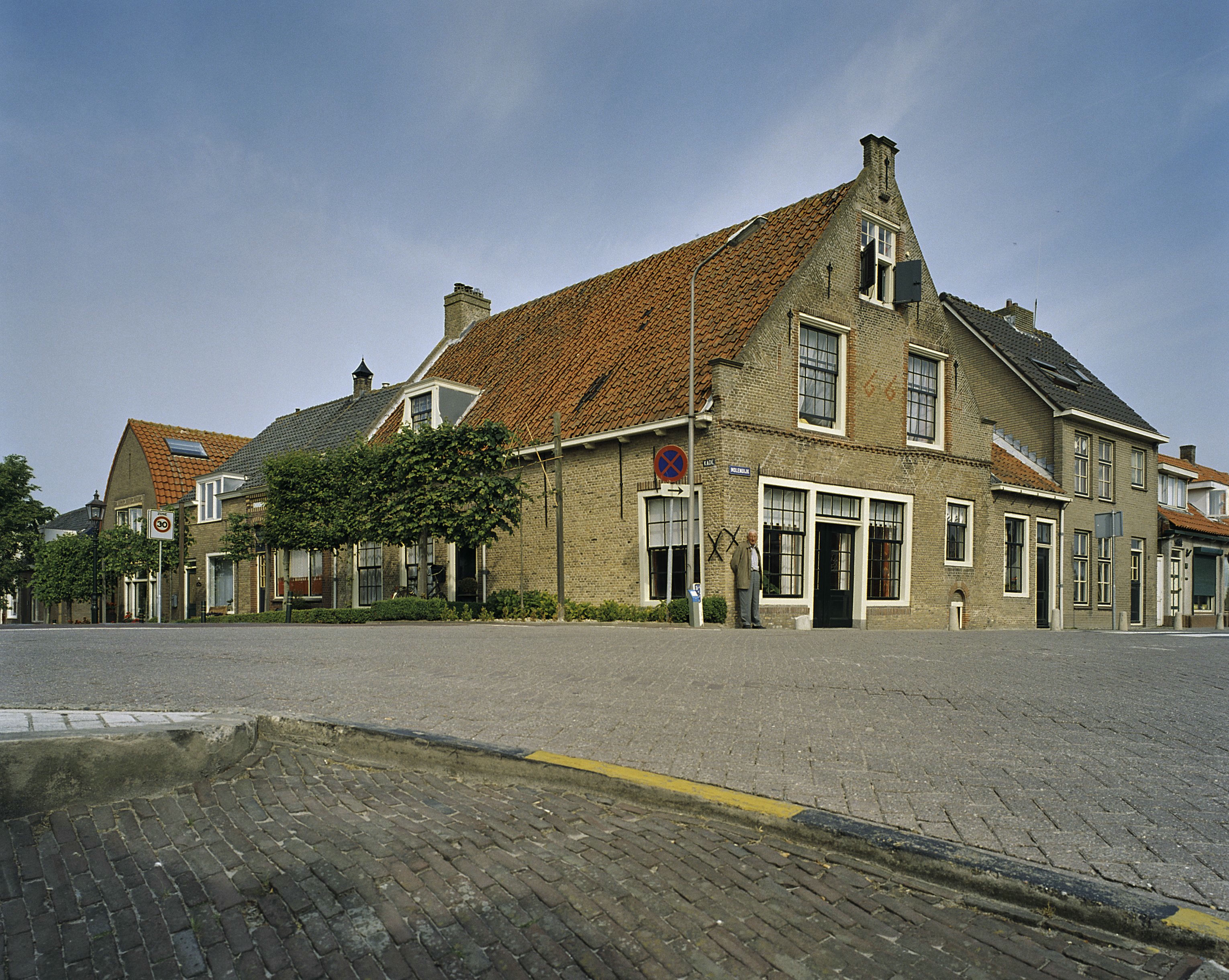
- Building in Pierhil

- Coat of arms

- Location in the province of South Holland in the Netherlands Location in the Netherlands
- Coordinates: 51°48′N 4°19′E
- Country: Netherlands
- Province: South Holland
- Municipality: Hoeksche Waard

Area
  - Total: 10.53 km^{2} (4.07 sq mi)
- Elevation: 1.6 m (5.2 ft)

Population (2021)
  - Total: 1,725
  - Density: 163.8/km^{2} (424.3/sq mi)
- Time zone: UTC+1 (CET)
  - Summer (DST): UTC+2 (CEST)
- Postal code: 3265
- Dialing code: 0186

Piershil is a village in the Dutch province of South Holland. It is a part of the municipality of Hoeksche Waard, and lies about 5 km south of Spijkenisse.

== History ==
The village was first mentioned in 1452 as "vidimus Piershille", and means "hill of Pier (diminutive of Pieter)". The area was poldered in 1246, but lost in 1421 or 1479 and repoldered in 1524. Piershil developed after the repoldering. In 1582, Nieuw-Piershil was reclaimed and it was no longer an island. The village was damaged by fire in 1739.

The Dutch Reformed church is an aisleless church with needle spire which was built in 1524. The tower probably dates from the 15th century. The northern wing was added in 1642, and redeveloped into a consistory between 1970 and 1971. The grist mill Simonia was built in 1854. It remained in service until 1960 and was sold to the municipality in 1966. Between 1973 and 1974, it was restored and is used on a voluntary basis.

Piershil was home to 689 people in 1840. It was a separate municipality between 1817 and 1984, when it became part of Korendijk. It became part of the municipality of Hoeksche Waard in 2019.

== Gallery ==
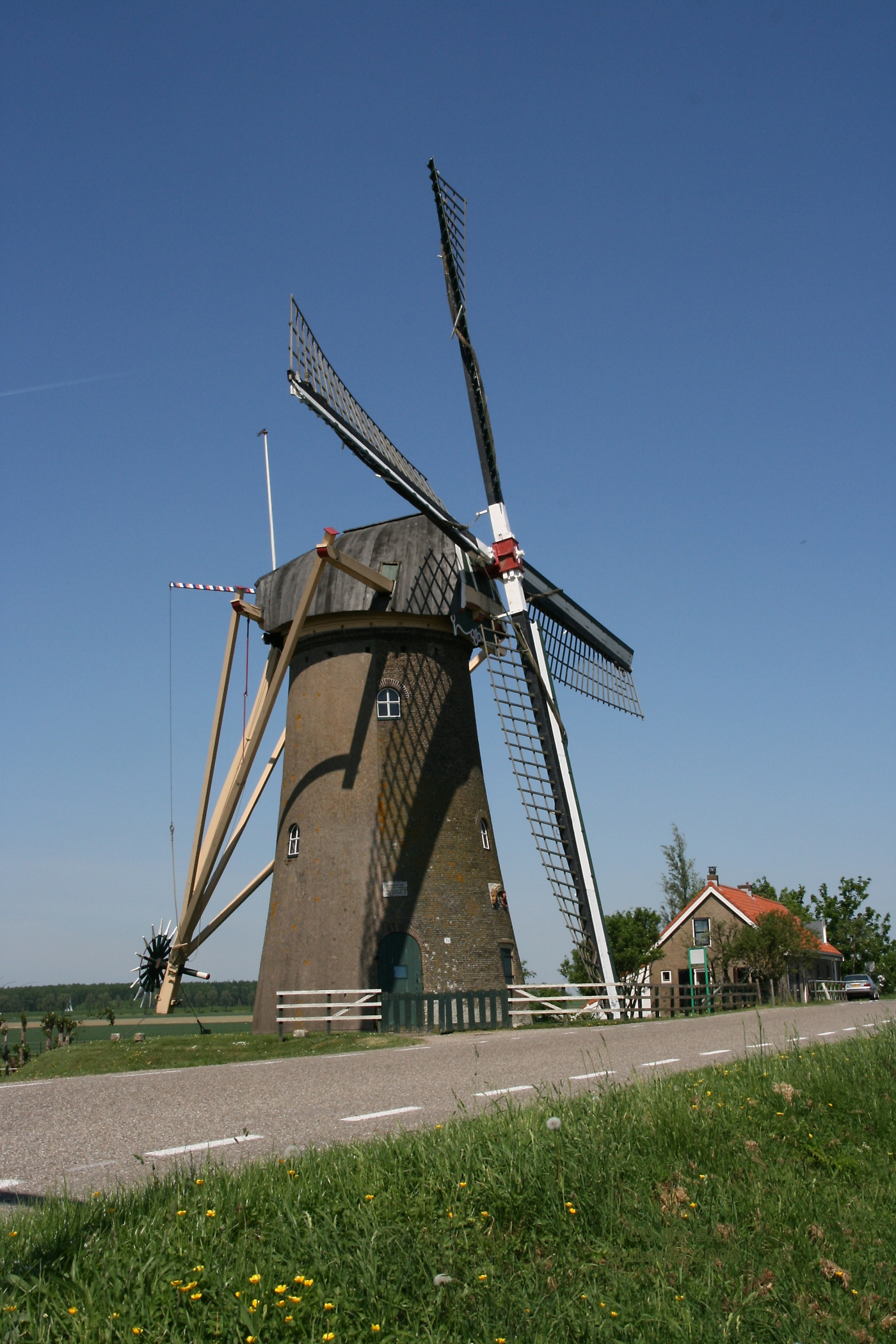
Windmill Simonia

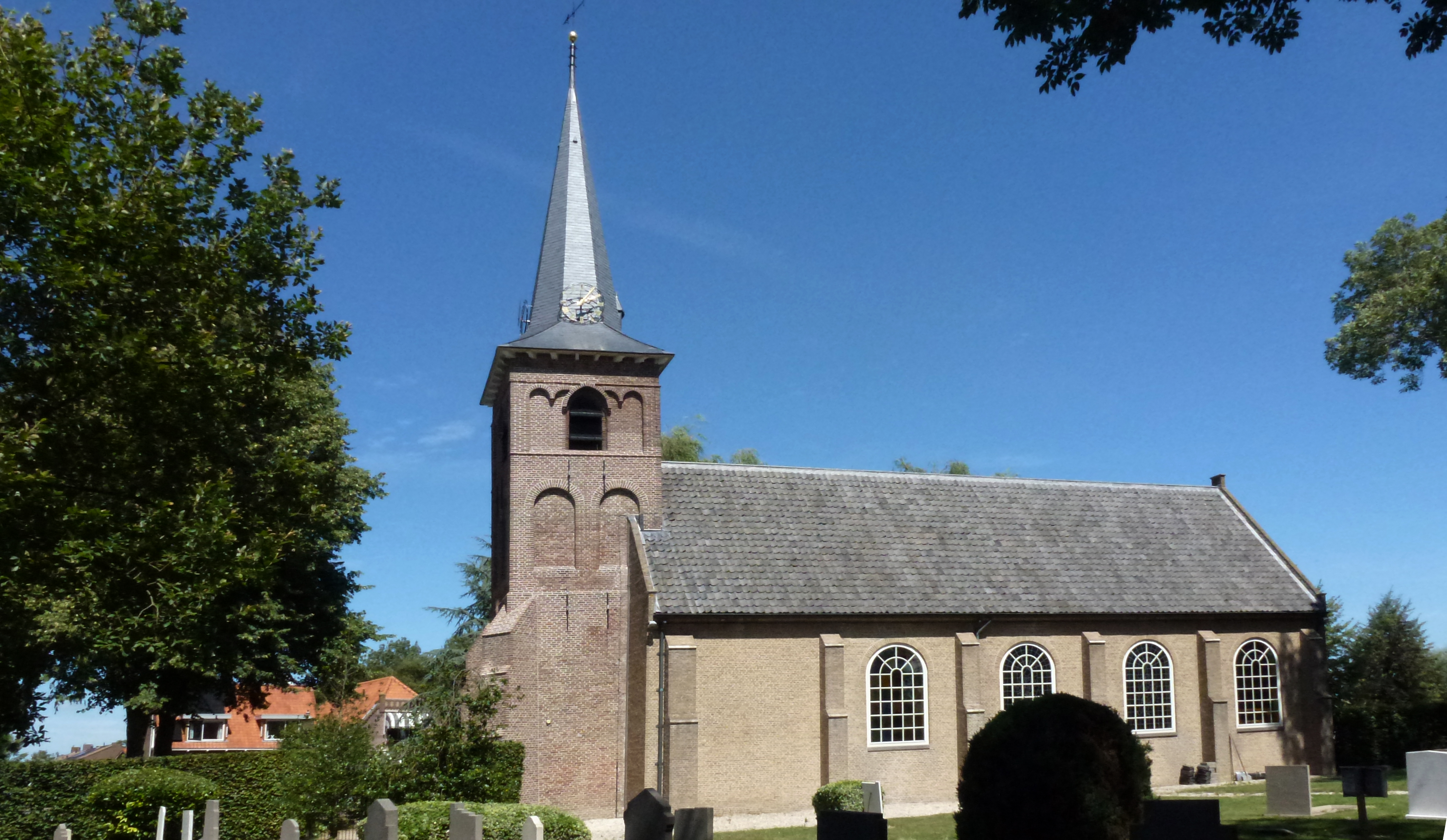
Dutch Reformed church
