= Oud-Beijerland =

- Town
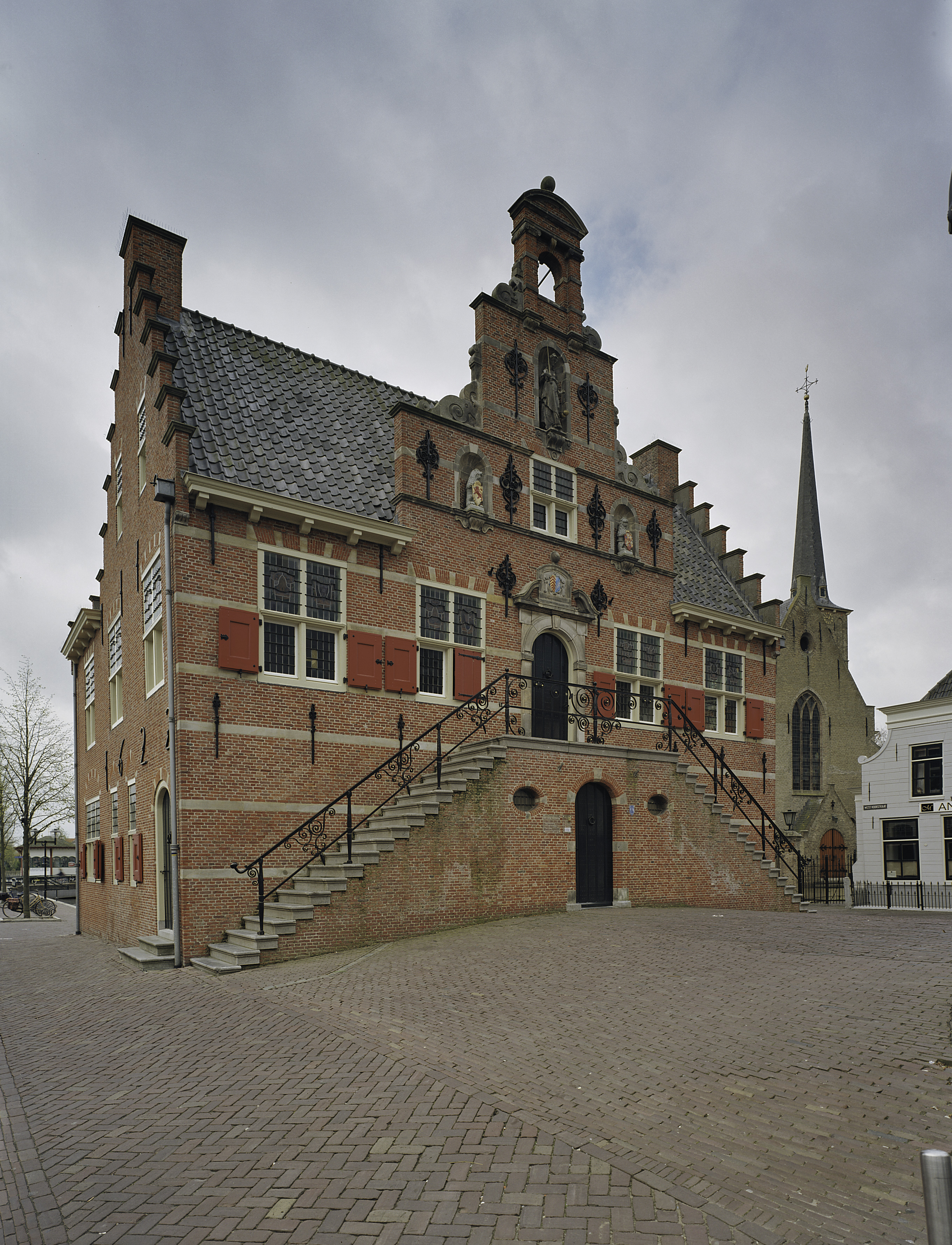
- Old city hall

- Flag Coat of arms

- Location in the province of South Holland in the Netherlands Location in the Netherlands
- Coordinates: 51°49′N 4°24′E
- Country: Netherlands
- Province: South Holland
- Municipality: Hoeksche Waard
- Merged: 2019

Area
  - Total: 19.61 km^{2} (7.57 sq mi)
- Elevation: 0.2 m (0.66 ft)

Population (2021)
  - Total: 24,670
  - Density: 1,258/km^{2} (3,258/sq mi)
- Demonym: Oud-Beijerlander
- Time zone: UTC+1 (CET)
  - Summer (DST): UTC+2 (CEST)
- Postal code: 3260–3263
- Dialing code: 0186
- Website: www.oud-beijerland.nl

Oud-Beijerland (Dutch pronunciation: [ˌʌud ˈbɛiərlɑnt]) (Note: In isolation, Oud is pronounced [ˈʌut].) is a town and former municipality in the western Netherlands, in the province of South Holland, now a part of the Hoeksche Waard municipality. With a population of 24,575 in 2020, it is the most populous town of the Hoeksche Waard island. The town is located adjacent to the confluence of the Oude Maas and Spui River.

The town of Oud-Beijerland also includes the communities Vuurbaken and Zinkweg.

== History ==
After the St. Elizabeth's flood (1421), large parts of the islands Putten and Grote Waard were lost and became clay banks and salt marshes which would be inundated at high tide and be unsuitable for habitation. In subsequent centuries, portions of land would be reclaimed.

Oud-Beijerland was formed in 1559 as "Beijerland" by Lamoral, Count of Egmont. He was granted the rights to this area in 1557 and had the land reclaimed. This new polder was named Beijerland, Moerkerken, Cromstrijen en de Greup. Circa 1624 the smaller polders Bosschenpolder and Nieuwlandpolder were added to it. Beijerland was named after Sabina of Bavaria (Dutch: Beieren), wife of the Count of Egmont.

In 1582 the name was changed to Oud-Beijerland, in order to distinguish it from Nieuw-Beijerland which was formed several kilometers to the west.

In 1604 the village got its churchtower from Sabina van Beijeren, and in 1622 the town hall was built. Oud-Beijerland then became one of the most important market places of the Hoeksche Waard. Its economy was dependent on trade, industry, agriculture and fishing. This brought prosperity which is still reflected in the elegant mansions along the Vliet.

From the end of the 19th century until ca. 1955, a tram connected Oud-Beijerland with Rotterdam. The tram was nicknamed "Het Moordenaartje" (The Little Murderer) because of the high rate of casualties involved with its operation.

== Gallery ==
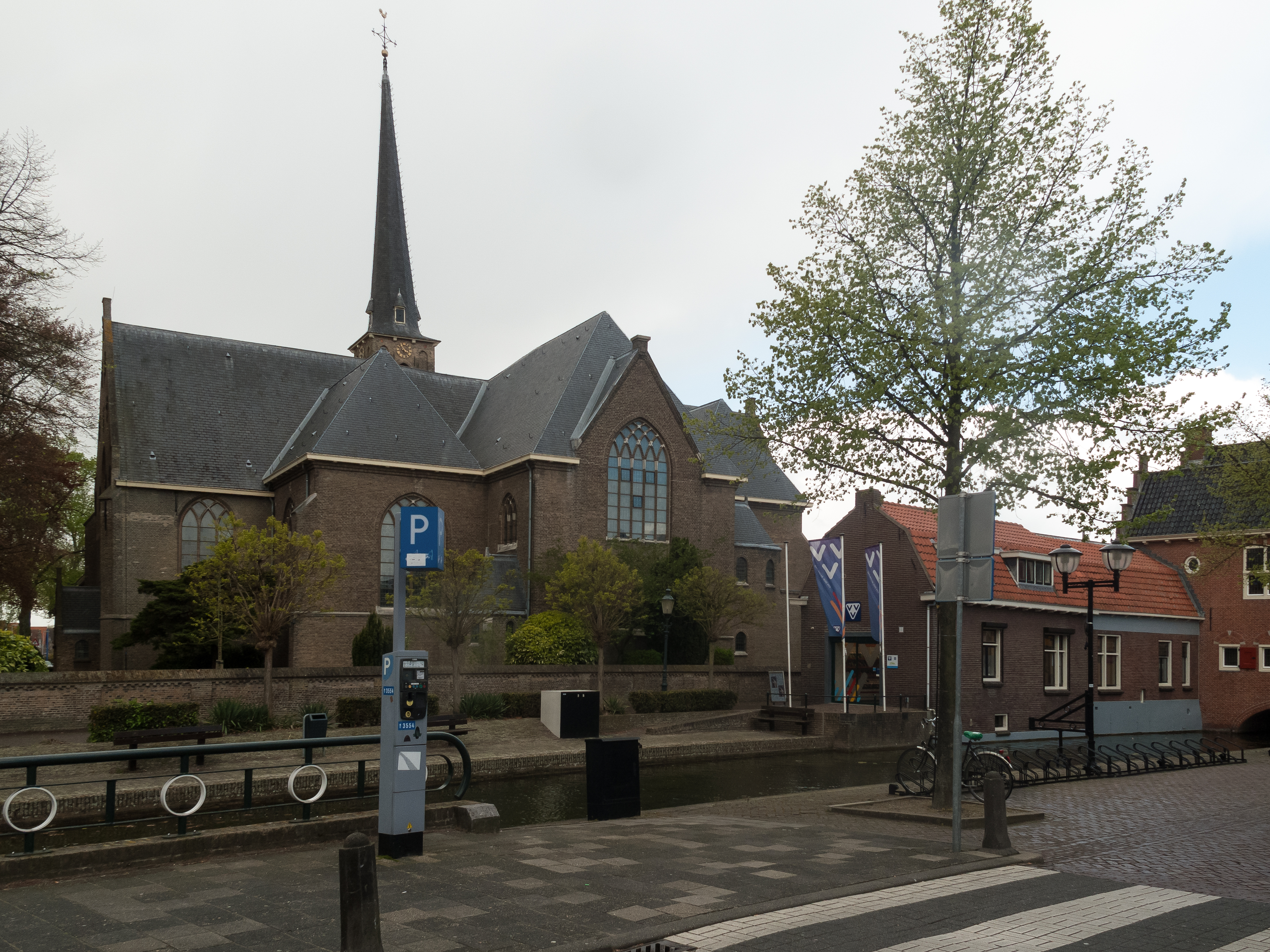
Oud-Beijerland, church (de Dorpskerk) and tower

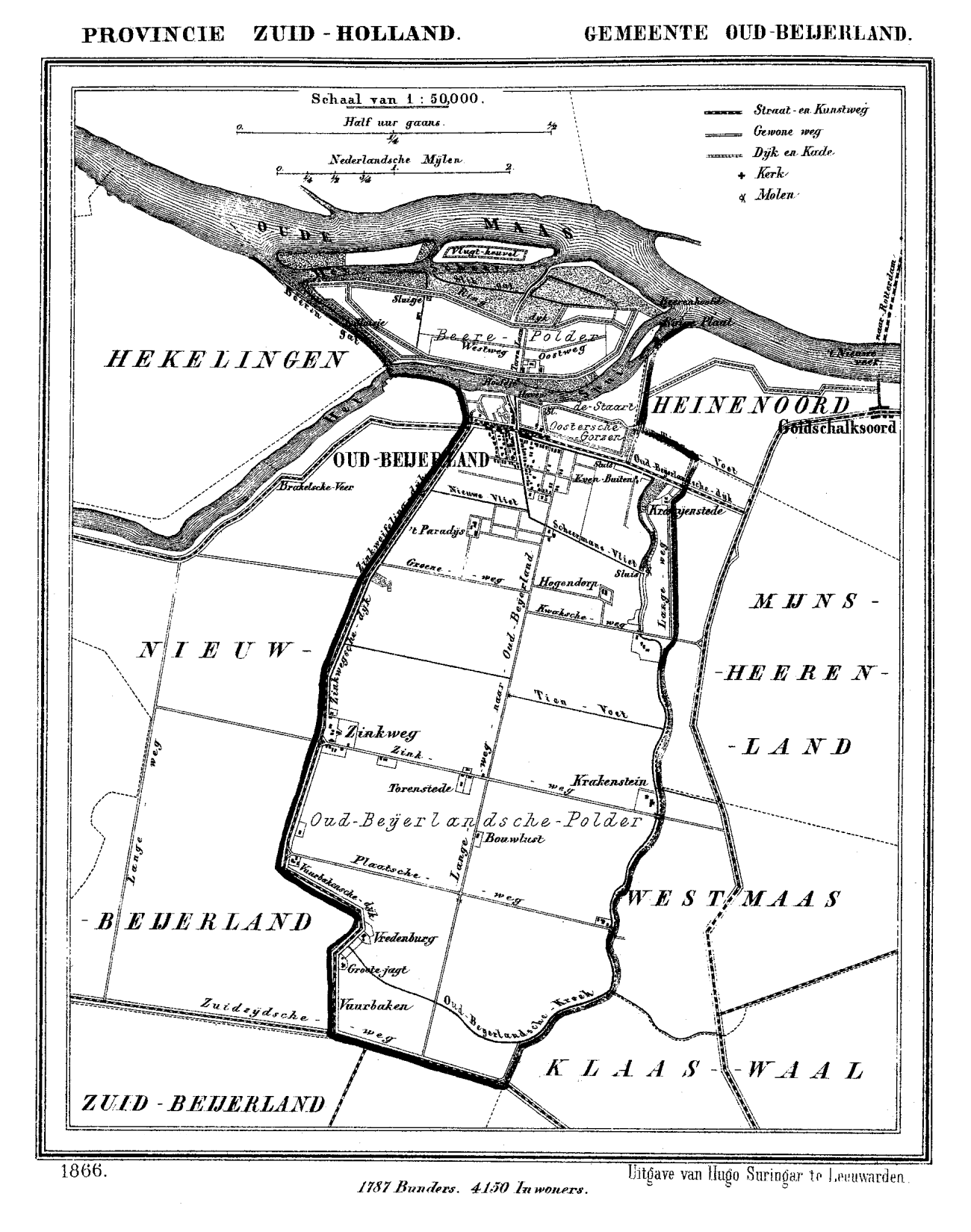
Oud-Beijerland in 1866

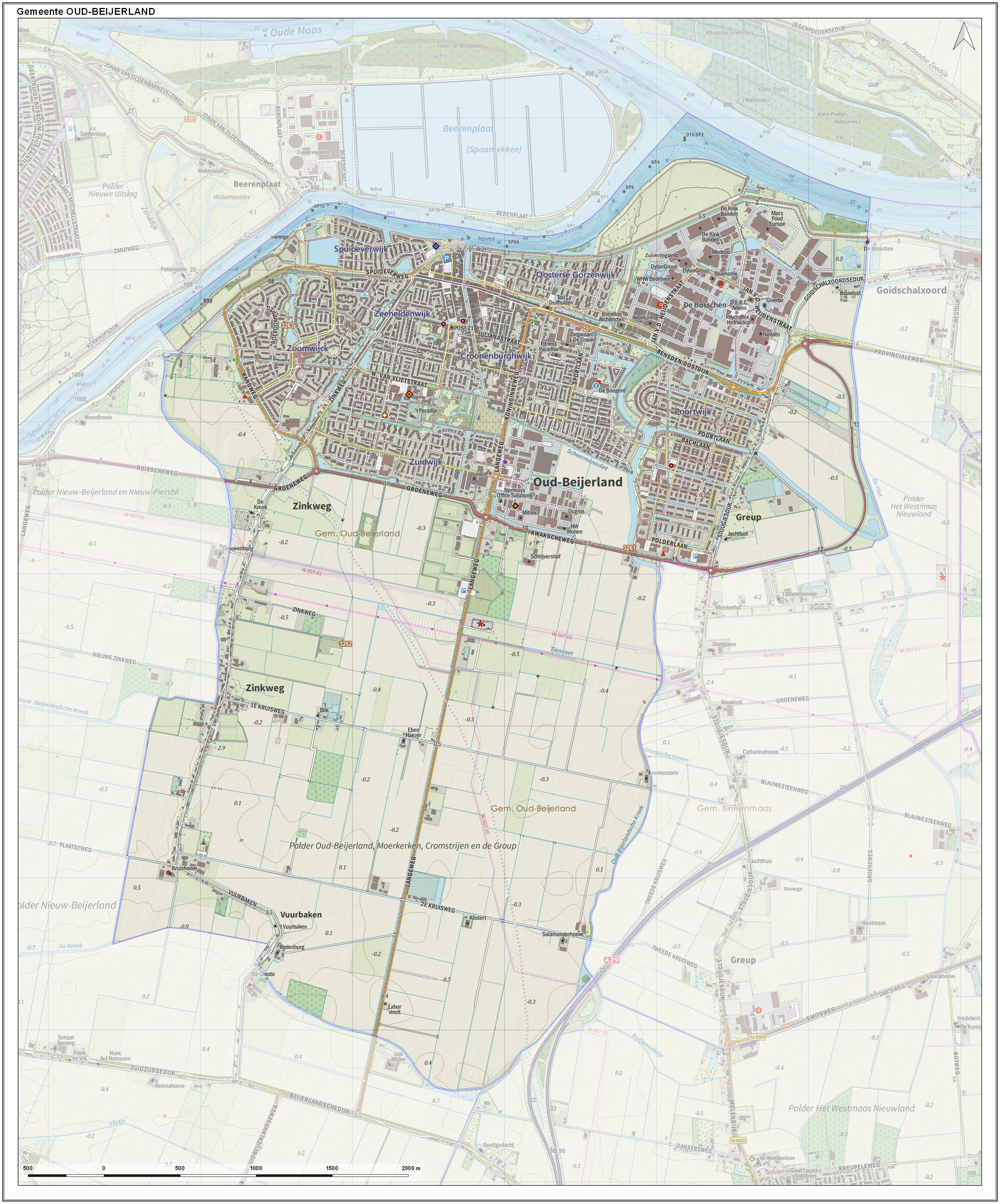
Dutch Topographic map of the town of Oud-Beijerland, June 2015
