= Zuid-Beijerland =

- Village
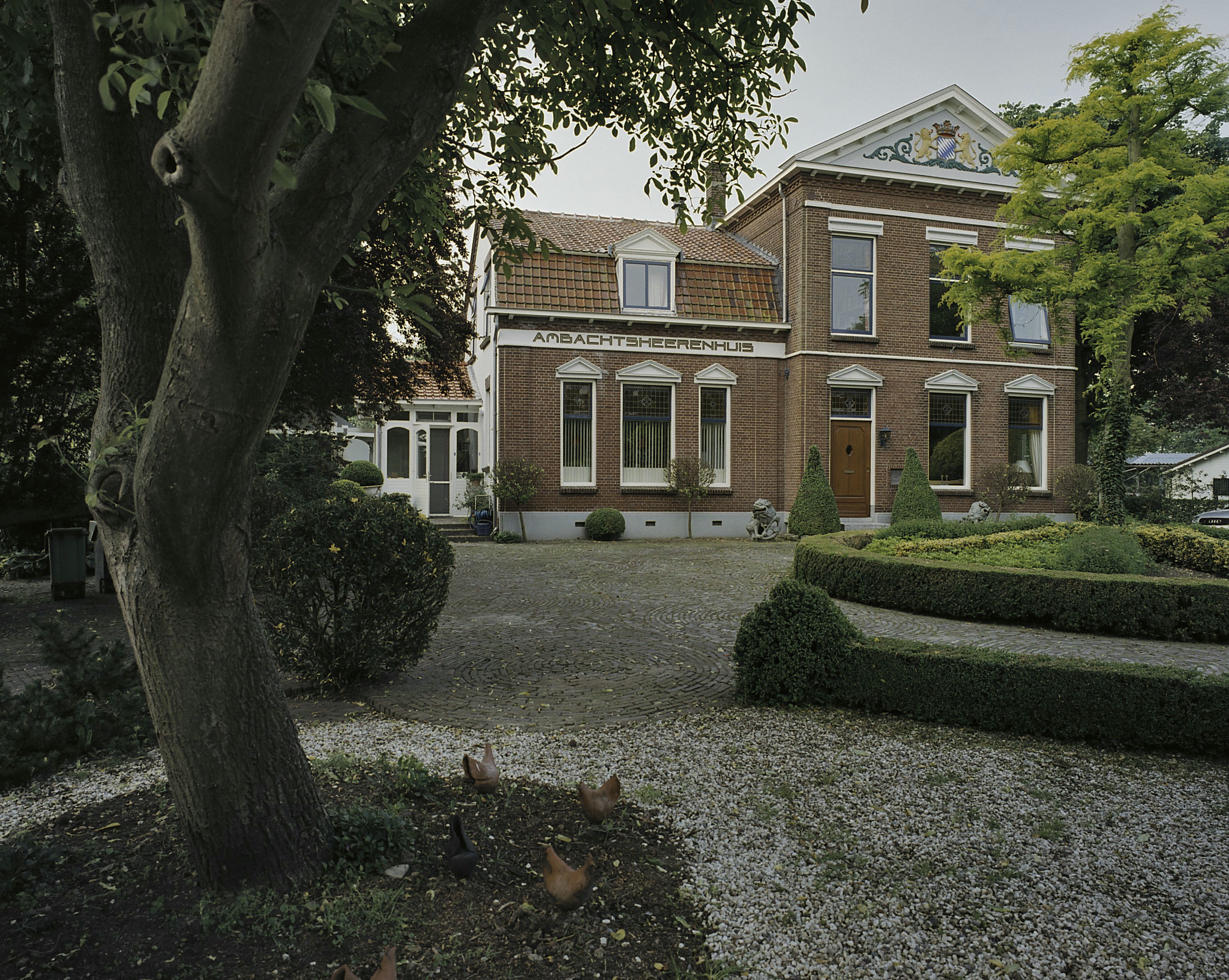
- Former town hall

- Flag Coat of arms

- Location in the province of South Holland in the Netherlands Location in the Netherlands
- Coordinates: 51°45′5″N 4°22′4″E
- Country: Netherlands
- Province: South Holland
- Municipality: Hoeksche Waard

Area
  - Total: 32.11 km^{2} (12.40 sq mi)
- Elevation: 0.0 m (0 ft)

Population (2021)
  - Total: 3,570
  - Density: 111/km^{2} (288/sq mi)
- Time zone: UTC+1 (CET)
  - Summer (DST): UTC+2 (CEST)
- Postal code: 3284
- Dialing code: 0186

Zuid-Beijerland is a village in the Dutch province of South Holland. It is a part of the municipality of Hoeksche Waard, and lies about 10 km south of Oud-Beijerland.

The village was originally called Den Hitsert. The current name was first used between 1839 and 1859. It is named after the eponymous polder. Zuid (south) has been added to distinguish from Oud-Beijerland and Nieuw-Beijerland. Zuid-Beijerland developed as a dike village after the polder was enclosed with a dike in 1631. It became an independent parish in 1671. The church is a cruciform church with needle spire which was built in 1933 after its predecessor burnt down. The church belongs to the Protestant community of Zuid-Beijerland.

Zuid-Beijerland was home to 798 people in 1840. It was a separate municipality until 1984, when it became part of Korendijk, which itself later became Hoeksche Waard.

== Gallery ==
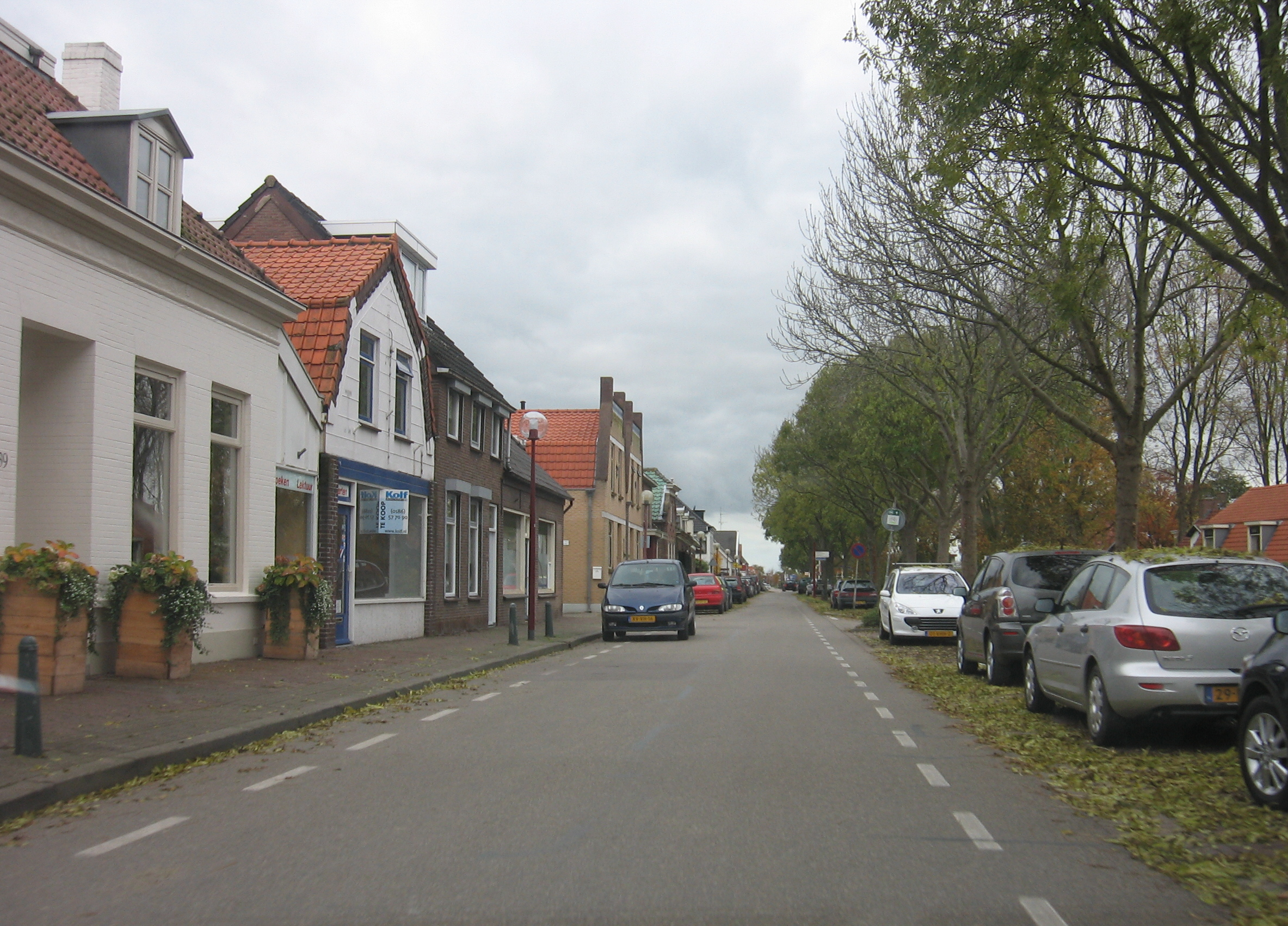
Street view

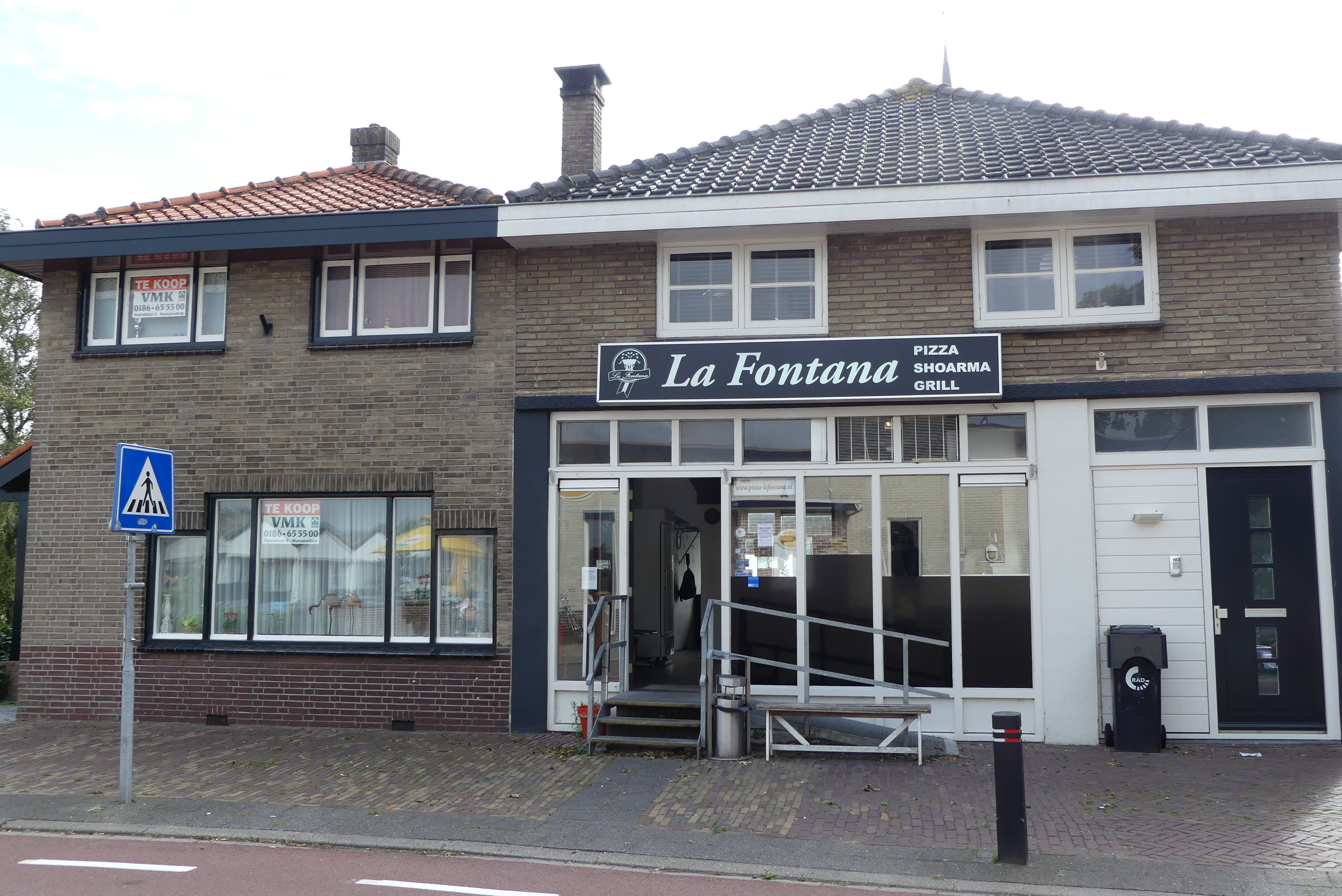
Houses in Zuid-Beijerland

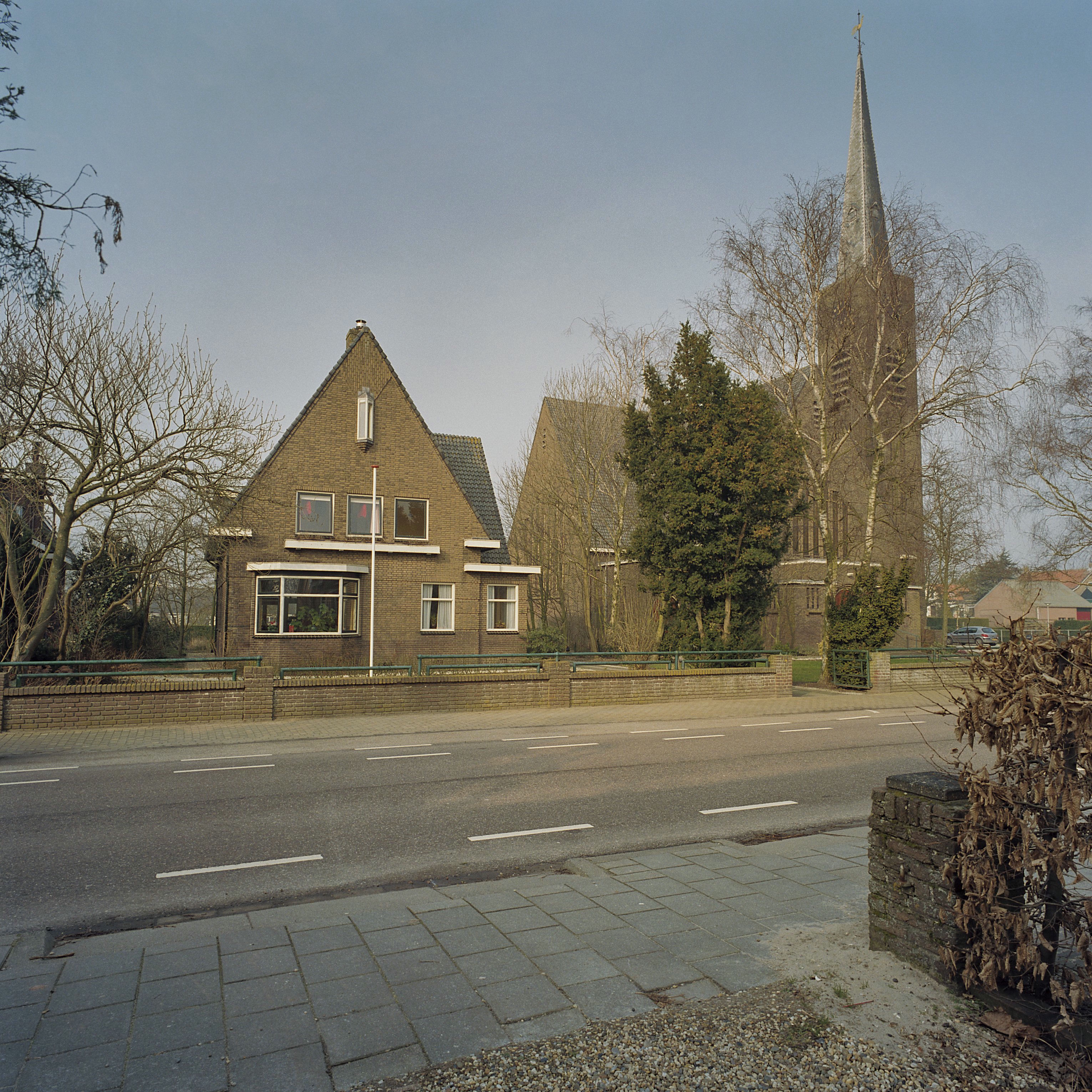
Dutch Reformed church and clergy house

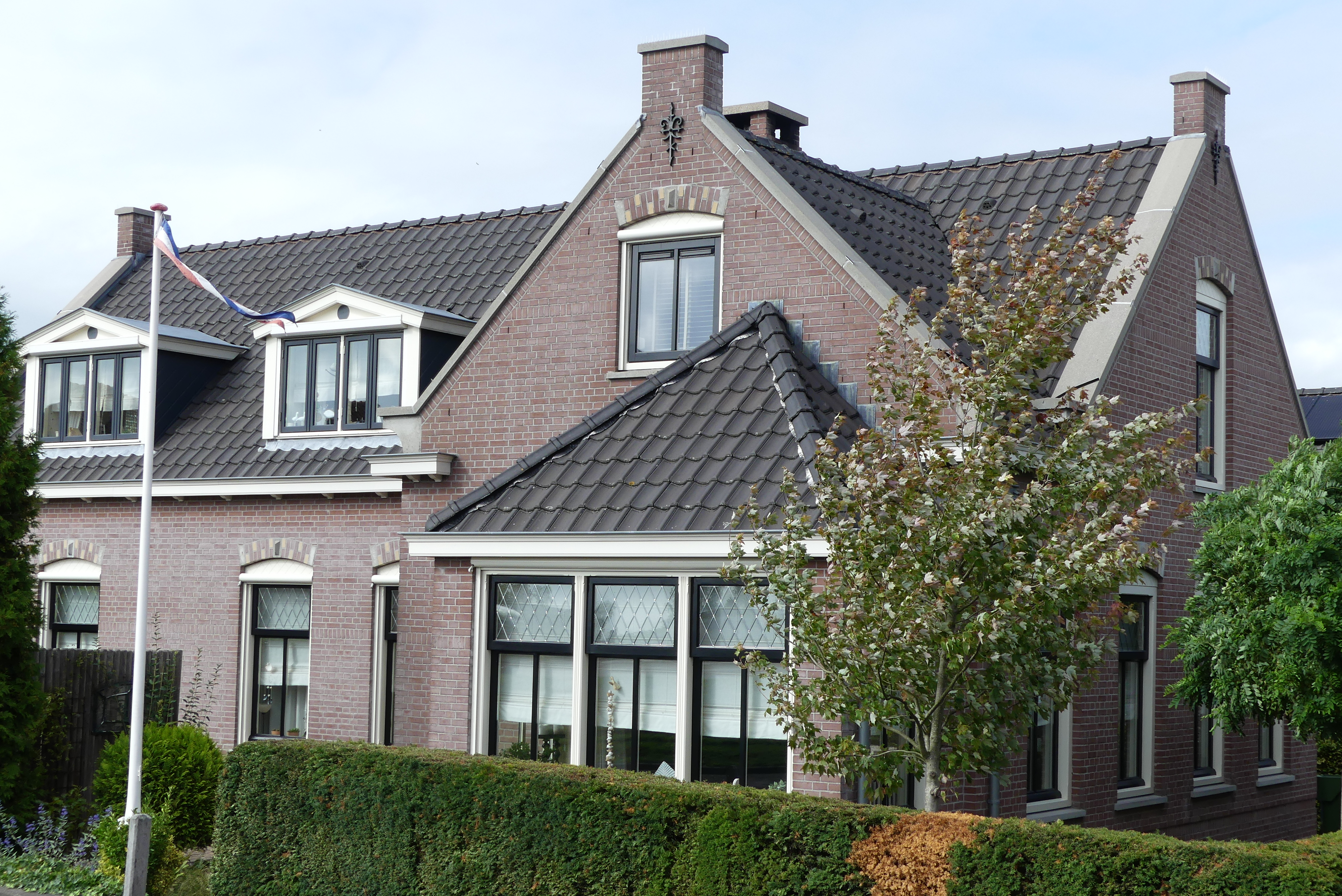
House in Zuid-Beijerland
