= Nieuw-Beijerland =

- Village
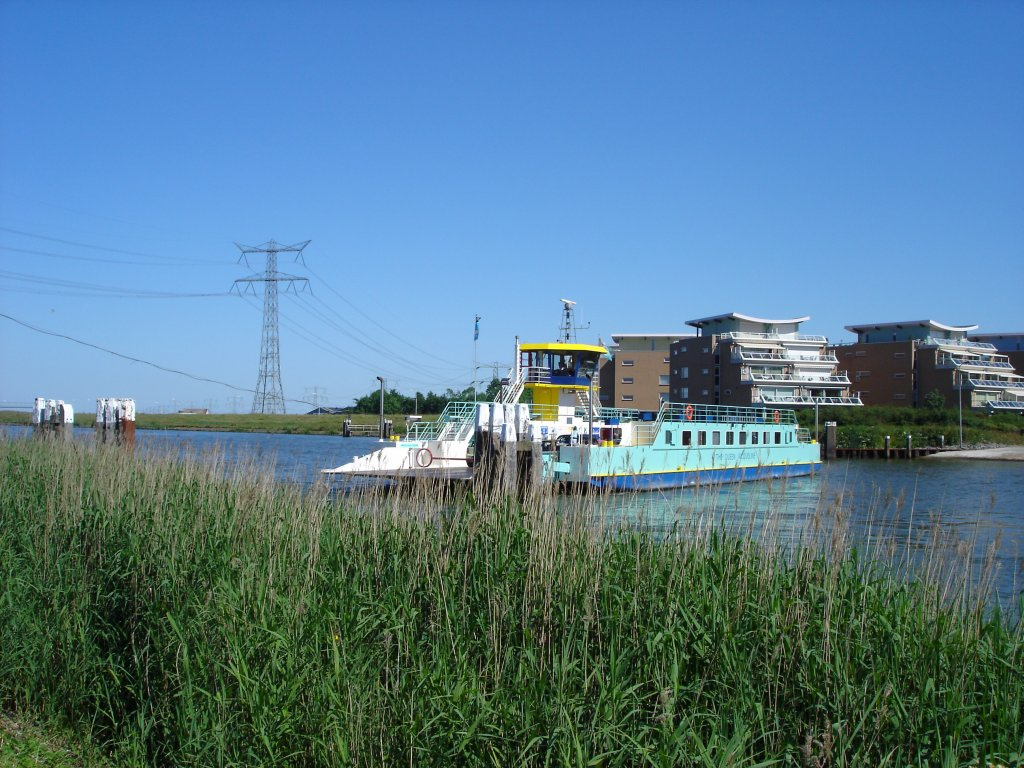
- The ferry across the Spui from Hekelingen to Nieuw-Beijerland

- Coat of arms

- Location in the province of South Holland in the Netherlands Location in the Netherlands
- Coordinates: 51°48′43″N 4°20′33″E
- Country: Netherlands
- Province: South Holland
- Municipality: Hoeksche Waard

Area
  - Total: 12.31 km^{2} (4.75 sq mi)
- Elevation: 0.5 m (1.6 ft)

Population (2021)
  - Total: 4,195
  - Density: 340.8/km^{2} (882.6/sq mi)
- Time zone: UTC+1 (CET)
  - Summer (DST): UTC+2 (CEST)
- Postal code: 3264
- Dialing code: 0186

Nieuw-Beijerland is a village in the Dutch province of South Holland. It is a part of the municipality of Hoeksche Waard, and lies about 3 km south of Spijkenisse.

== History ==
The village was first mentioned in 1773 as Nieuw Beierland, and is named after the polder which was created in 1582. Nieuw (new) has been added to distinguish from Oud-Beijerland. The centre of the village has a grid structure.

The Dutch Reformed church is an aisleless church with needle tower built in 1826. The grist mill De Swaen was originally built in 1703, but rebuilt in 1932 after a fire. The wind mill can turn, but the inner workings have been removed.

Nieuw-Beijerland was home to 1,012 people in 1840. It was a separate municipality until 1984, when it became part of Korendijk. Korendijk was merged into the new municipality Hoeksche Waard in January 2019.

On 27 August 2022 a lorry crashed into a barbeque killing 7 people.

== Gallery ==
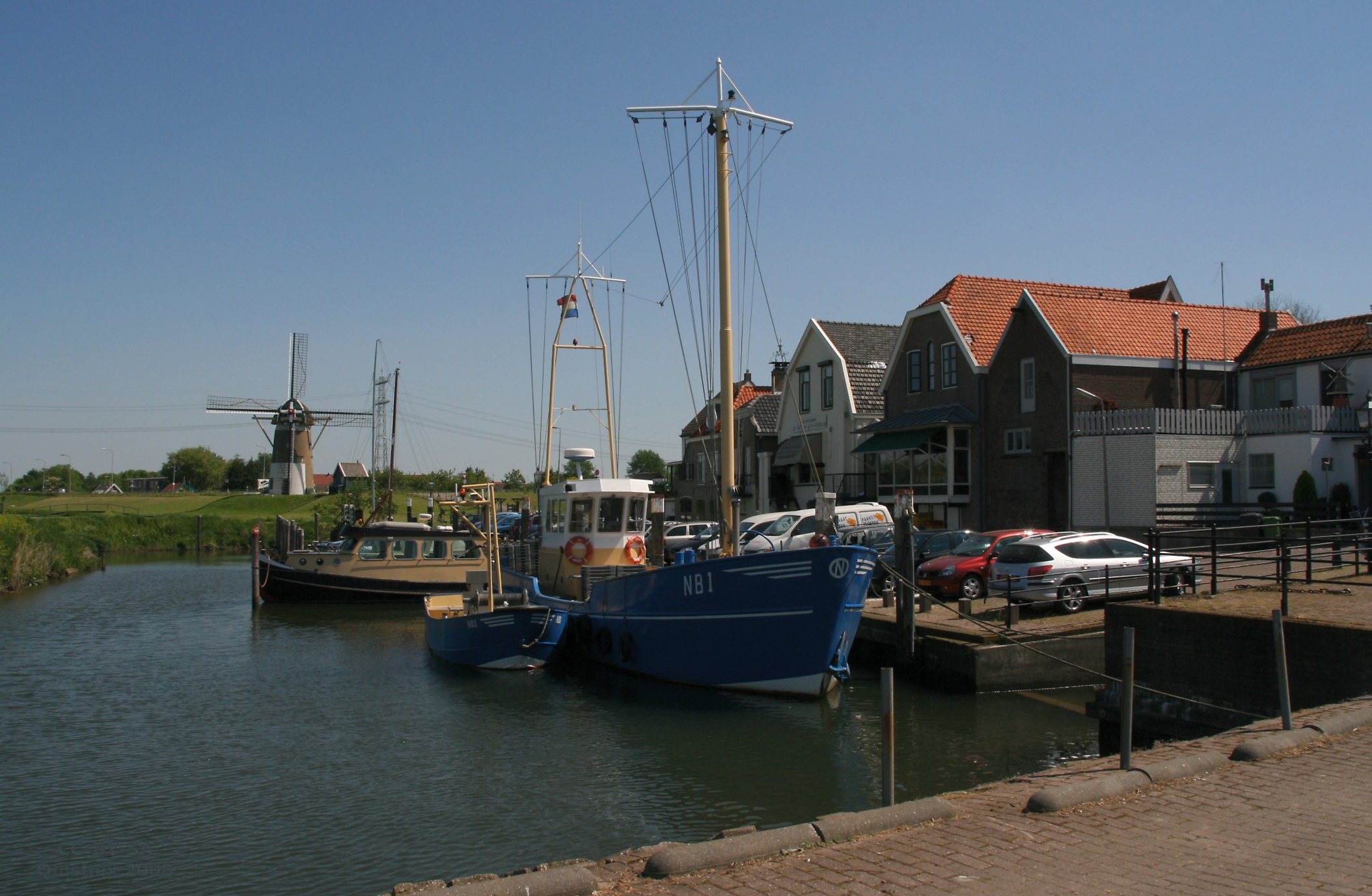
The harbour of Nieuw-Beijerland

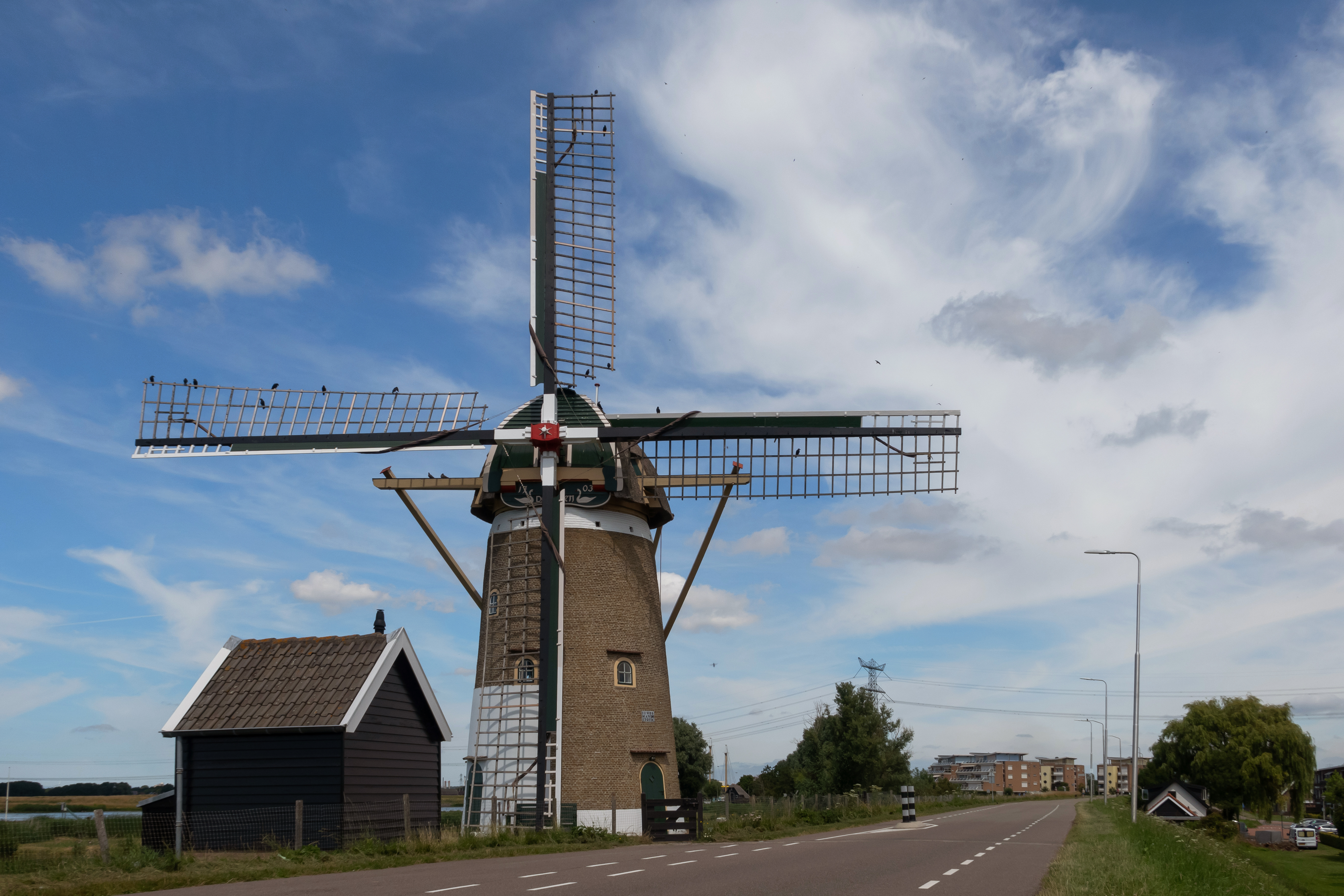
Windmill De Swaan
