= List of municipalities in South Holland =

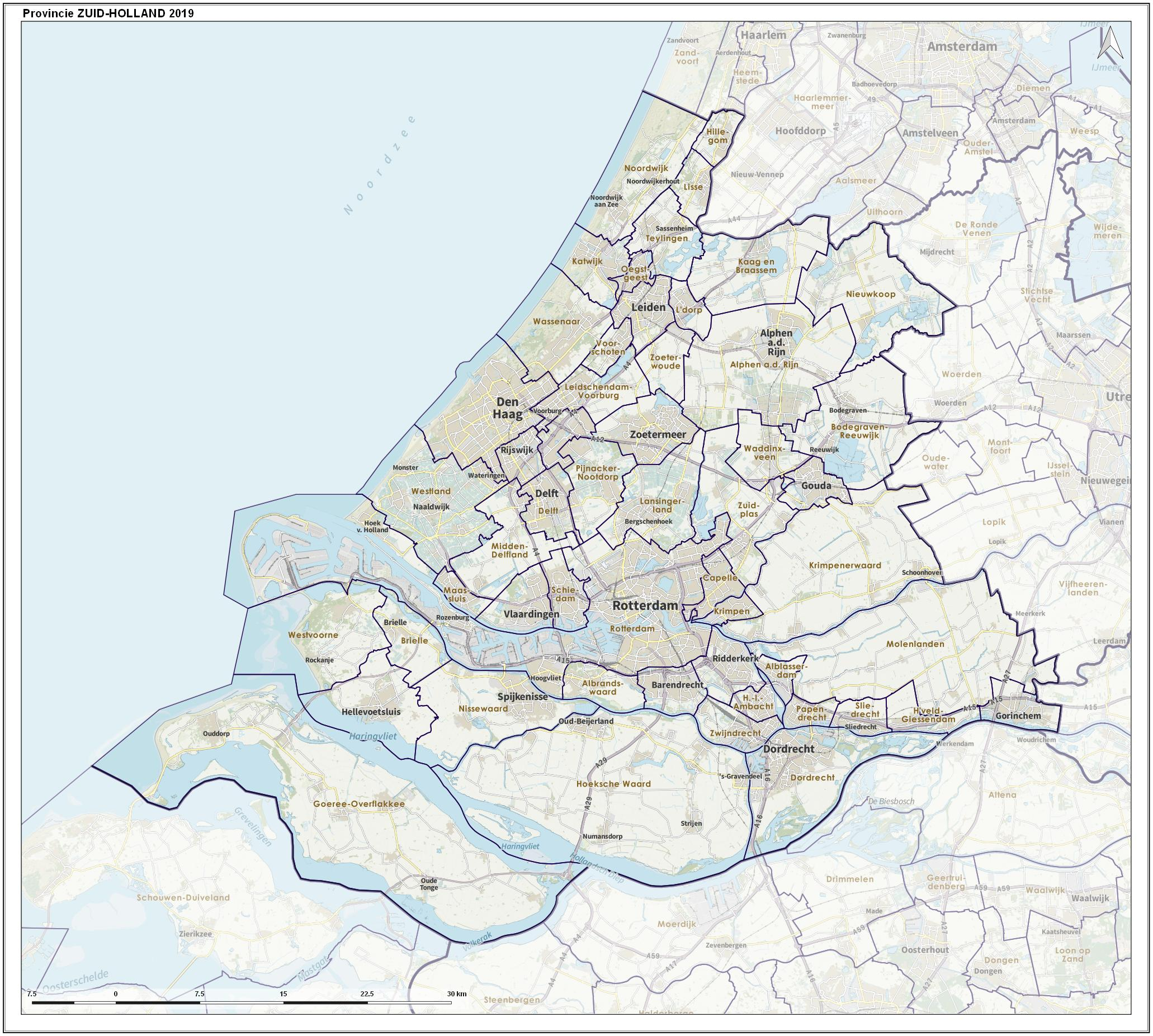
Map of South Holland (2019)

This is a list of municipalities in South Holland. South Holland is divided into 50 municipalities.

== Table ==
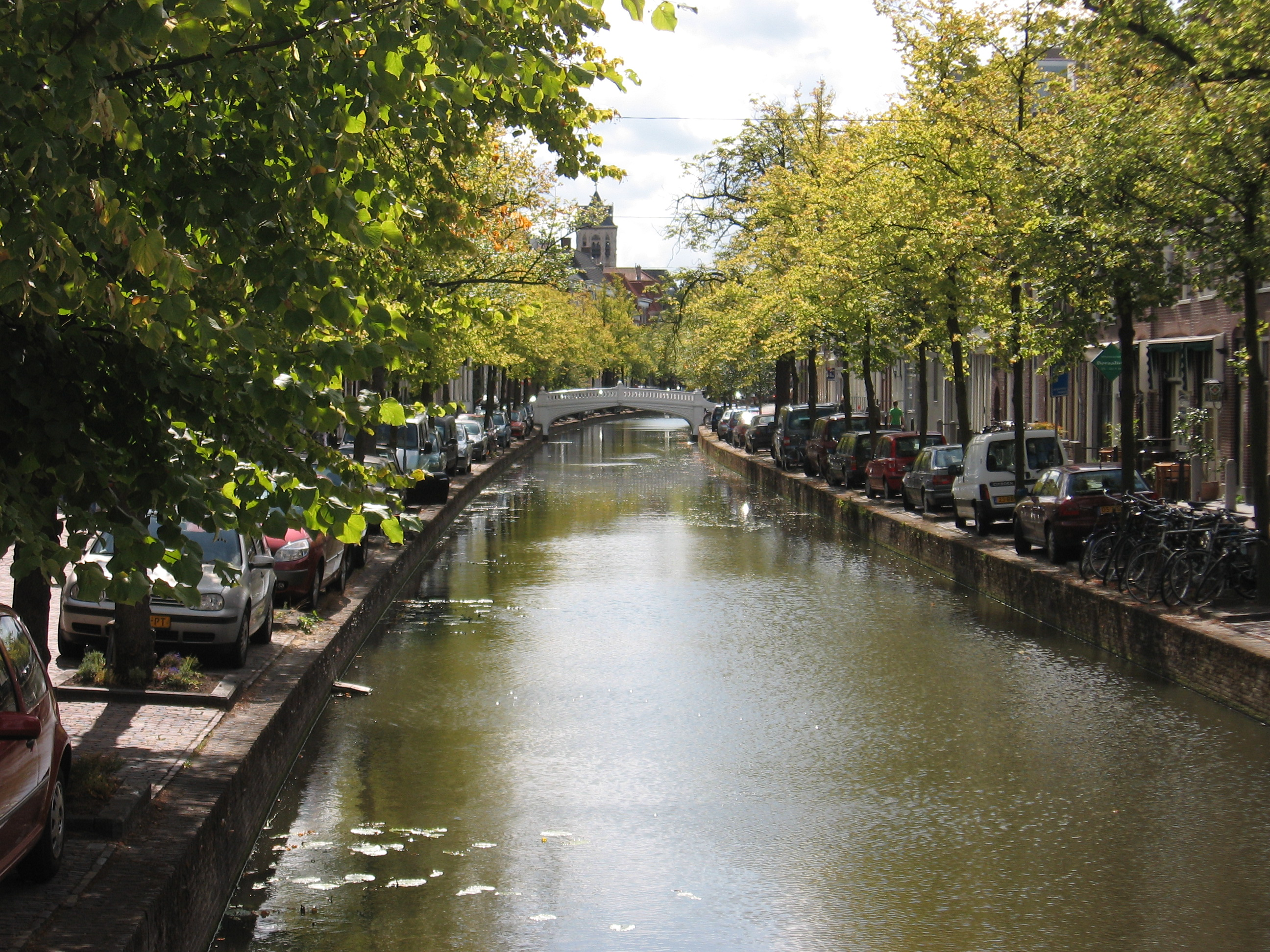
One of South Holland's historical towns is Delft, a stronghold of tourism and of (mainly technical) science.

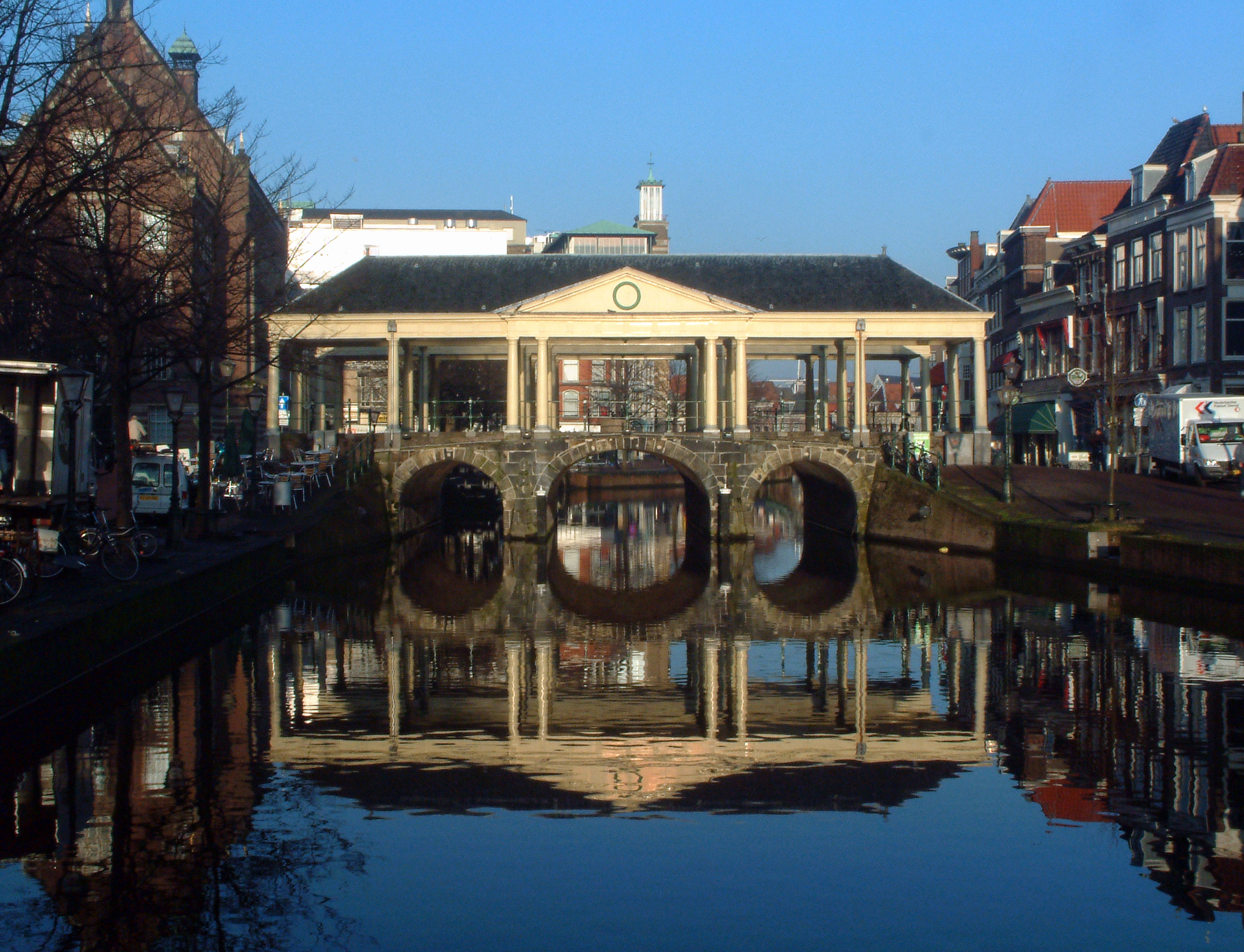
The Koornbrug (Grain Bridge) in Leiden, also a historical university city in South Holland.

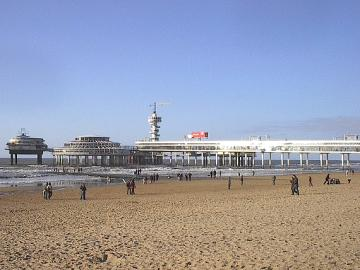
Scheveningen is the Netherlands' most popular seaside resorts.

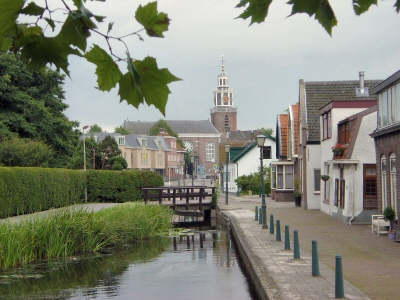
Zoetermeer, the third largest population centre in this province, was a typical South Holland village until the late 1960s.

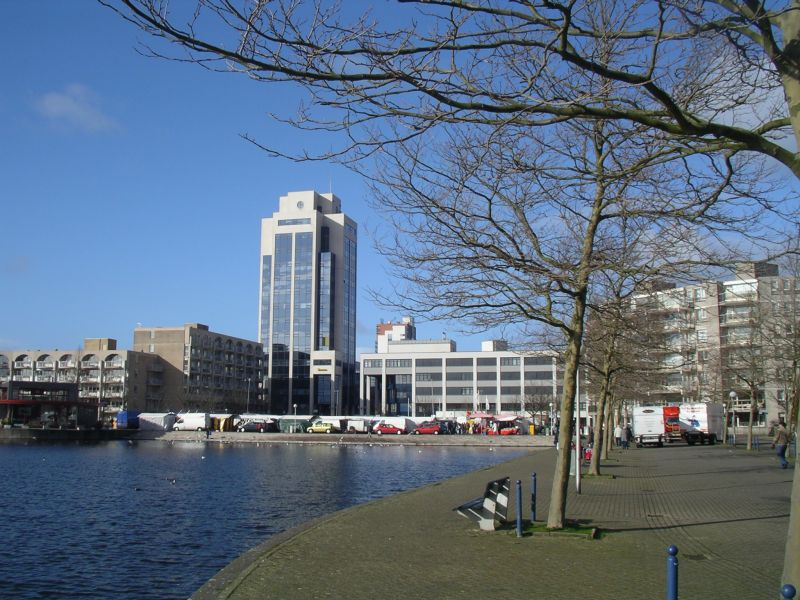
A view of the newly built Zoetermeer town centre.

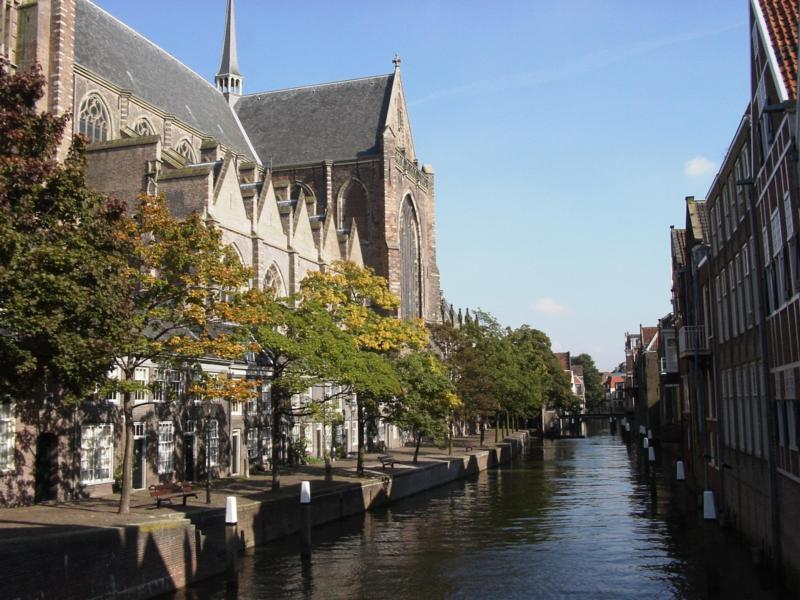
A canal at Dordrecht, which town is the oldest in Holland (North and South together) and has a rich history and culture.

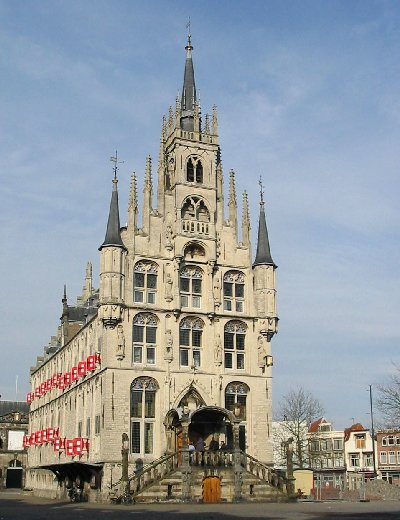
The 15th century town hall of Gouda, another historically rich town in South Holland.

CBS-code	Municipality Gemeente	Population	Land area (km^{2})	Population density (/km^{2})
482	Alblasserdam	20,136	8.78	2,293
613	Albrandswaard	25,814	21.69	1,190
484	Alphen aan den Rijn	112,587	126.23	892
489	Barendrecht	48,643	19.75	2,463
1901	Bodegraven-Reeuwijk	35,278	75.38	468
502	Capelle aan den IJssel	67,319	14.14	4,761
503	Delft	103,581	22.65	4,573
505	Dordrecht	119,115	79.01	1,508
1924	Goeree-Overflakkee	50,589	260.48	194
512	Gorinchem	37,410	18.83	1,987
513	Gouda	73,681	16.50	4,466
523	Hardinxveld-Giessendam	18,413	16.91	1,089
531	Hendrik-Ido-Ambacht	31,258	10.61	2,946
534	Hillegom	22,197	12.87	1,725
1963	Hoeksche Waard (municipality)	88,047	268.93	327
1884	Kaag en Braassem	27,541	63.24	435
537	Katwijk	65,995	24.75	2,666
542	Krimpen aan den IJssel	29,410	7.69	3,824
1931	Krimpenerwaard	56,622	148.40	382
1621	Lansingerland	63,363	53.42	1,186
546	Leiden	124,093	21.91	5,664
547	Leiderdorp	27,377	11.58	2,364
1916	Leidschendam-Voorburg	76,433	32.55	2,348
553	Lisse	22,982	15.69	1,465
556	Maassluis	33,567	8.48	3,958
1842	Midden-Delfland	19,414	47.19	411
1978	Molenlanden	44,130	181.73	243
569	Nieuwkoop	29,151	78.05	373
1930	Nissewaard	85,440	73.58	1,161
575	Noordwijk	44,062	58.37	755
579	Oegstgeest	25,064	7.31	3,429
590	Papendrecht	32,171	9.41	3,419
1926	Pijnacker-Nootdorp	55,674	37.08	1,501
597	Ridderkerk	46,671	23.72	1,968
603	Rijswijk	55,220	13.96	3,956
599	Rotterdam	651,631	217.55	2,995
606	Schiedam	79,279	17.82	4,449
610	Sliedrecht	25,597	12.84	1,994
1525	Teylingen	37,791	28.38	1,332
518	The Hague	548,320	82.45	6,650
622	Vlaardingen	73,924	23.57	3,136
1992	Voorne aan Zee			
626	Voorschoten	25,650	11.14	2,303
627	Waddinxveen	30,479	27.77	1,098
629	Wassenaar	26,949	51.11	527
1783	Westland	111,382	81.27	1,371
637	Zoetermeer	125,267	34.45	3,636
638	Zoeterwoude	8,843	21.19	417
1892	Zuidplas	45,064	58.02	777
642	Zwijndrecht	44,775	20.30	2,206

== Municipal reorganisations ==
Since 1840, South Holland has ceded five municipalities to the province of Utrecht: Oudewater in 1970, Woerden in 1989, Vianen in 2002, Leerdam and Zederik in 2019.

Municipal reorganisations since 2000:

- On 1 January 2002 the municipalities of Pijnacker and Nootdorp were merged into the new municipality of Pijnacker-Nootdorp.
- On 1 January 2002 the municipalities of Leidschendam and Voorburg were merged into the new municipality of Leidschendam-Voorburg.
- On 1 January 2002 the municipality of Vianen became a part of the province of Utrecht.
- On 1 January 2003 the municipality of Heerjansdam was merged into the existing municipality of Zwijndrecht.
- On 1 January 2004 the municipalities of De Lier, 's-Gravenzande, Monster, Naaldwijk and Wateringen were merged into the new municipality of Westland
- On 1 January 2004 the municipalities of Maasland and Schipluiden were merged into the new municipality of Midden-Delfland.
- On 1 January 2006 the municipalities of Sassenheim, Voorhout and Warmond were merged into the new municipality of Teylingen.
- On 1 January 2006 the municipalities of Rijnsburg and Valkenburg were merged into the existing municipality of Katwijk.
- On 1 January 2007 the municipalities of Liemeer and Ter Aar were merged into the existing municipality of Nieuwkoop.
- On 1 January 2007 the municipalities of Bergschenhoek, Berkel en Rodenrijs and Bleiswijk were merged into the new municipality of Lansingerland.
- On 1 January 2007 the municipality of 's-Gravendeel was merged into the existing municipality of Binnenmaas.
- On 1 January 2009 the municipalities of Alkemade and Jacobswoude were merged into the new municipality of Kaag en Braassem.
- On 1 January 2010 the municipalities of Moordrecht, Nieuwerkerk aan den IJssel and Zevenhuizen-Moerkapelle were merged into the new municipality of Zuidplas.
- On 18 March 2010 the municipality of Rozenburg was merged into the existing municipality of Rotterdam.
- On 1 January 2011 the municipalities of Bodegraven and Reeuwijk were merged into the new municipality of Bodegraven-Reeuwijk.
- On 1 January 2013 the municipalities of Graafstroom, Liesveld and Nieuw-Lekkerland were merged into the new municipality of Molenwaard.
- On 1 January 2013 the municipalities of Dirksland, Goedereede, Middelharnis and Oostflakkee were merged into the new municipality of Goeree-Overflakkee.
- On 1 January 2014 the municipalities of Boskoop and Rijnwoude were merged into the existing municipality of Alphen aan den Rijn.
- On 1 January 2015 the municipalities of Bergambacht, Nederlek, Ouderkerk, Schoonhoven and Vlist were merged into Krimpenerwaard.
- On 1 January 2015 the municipalities of Bernisse and Spijkenisse were merged into Nissewaard.
- On 1 January 2019 the municipalities of Binnenmaas, Cromstrijen, Korendijk, Oud-Beijerland and Strijen were merged into Hoeksche Waard.
- On 1 January 2019 the municipalities of Giessenlanden and Molenwaard were merged into the new municipality of Molenlanden.
- On 1 January 2019 the municipality of Noordwijkerhout was merged into the existing municipality of Noordwijk.
- On 1 January 2019 the municipalities of Leerdam, Zederik and Vianen (Utrecht) were merged into the new municipality of Vijfheerenlanden. This municipality was added to the province of Utrecht.
- On 1 January 2023 the municipalities of Brielle, Hellevoetsluis and Westvoorne were merged into the new municipality of Voorne aan Zee.

== See also ==
- List of cities, towns and villages in South Holland
