= Tempel, Berkel en Rodenrijs =

Coordinates: 52°04′N 4°42′E

Tempel, also known as De Tempel, is a former municipality and former manorial estate in the Dutch province of South Holland. It was located about 3 km southwest of the center of the current village of Berkel en Rodenrijs.

According to the 19th-century historian A.J. van der Aa, Tempel was named after a manor house that used to be located in the area. Around the beginning of the 19th century, the house was long gone.

In nearby Overschie an estate can be found where in the 18th century the owner of Tempel used to live. He acquired it in 1715, after which the house Berkeloord was renamed to De Tempel. The manorial rights of Tempel were also applicable at the estate, even though it was located outside of its territory.

After the introduction of the municipal system by the French in 1812, the area belonged to the municipality of Pijnacker, even though it was completely surrounded by the territory of Berkel en Rodenrijs. In 1817, the manorial rights were restored, and Tempel became a separate municipality, although it was very small (only 0.109 km^{2}) and had no inhabitants. This was not a problem, as long as the lord of the area was prepared to pay for the municipal government. In 1855, the municipality became part of Berkel en Rodenrijs. Since 2007, Tempel is a part of Lansingerland, when Berkel en Rodenrijs merged with Bergschenhoek and Bleiswijk.

The coat of arms of the manor and former municipality of Tempel depict a silver portal (i.e. a temple entrance), on a shield of gules. The flag is an armorial banner, with the portal placed off-center, towards the hoist.
