= Rotte, Lansingerland =

Rotte
- Vicinity
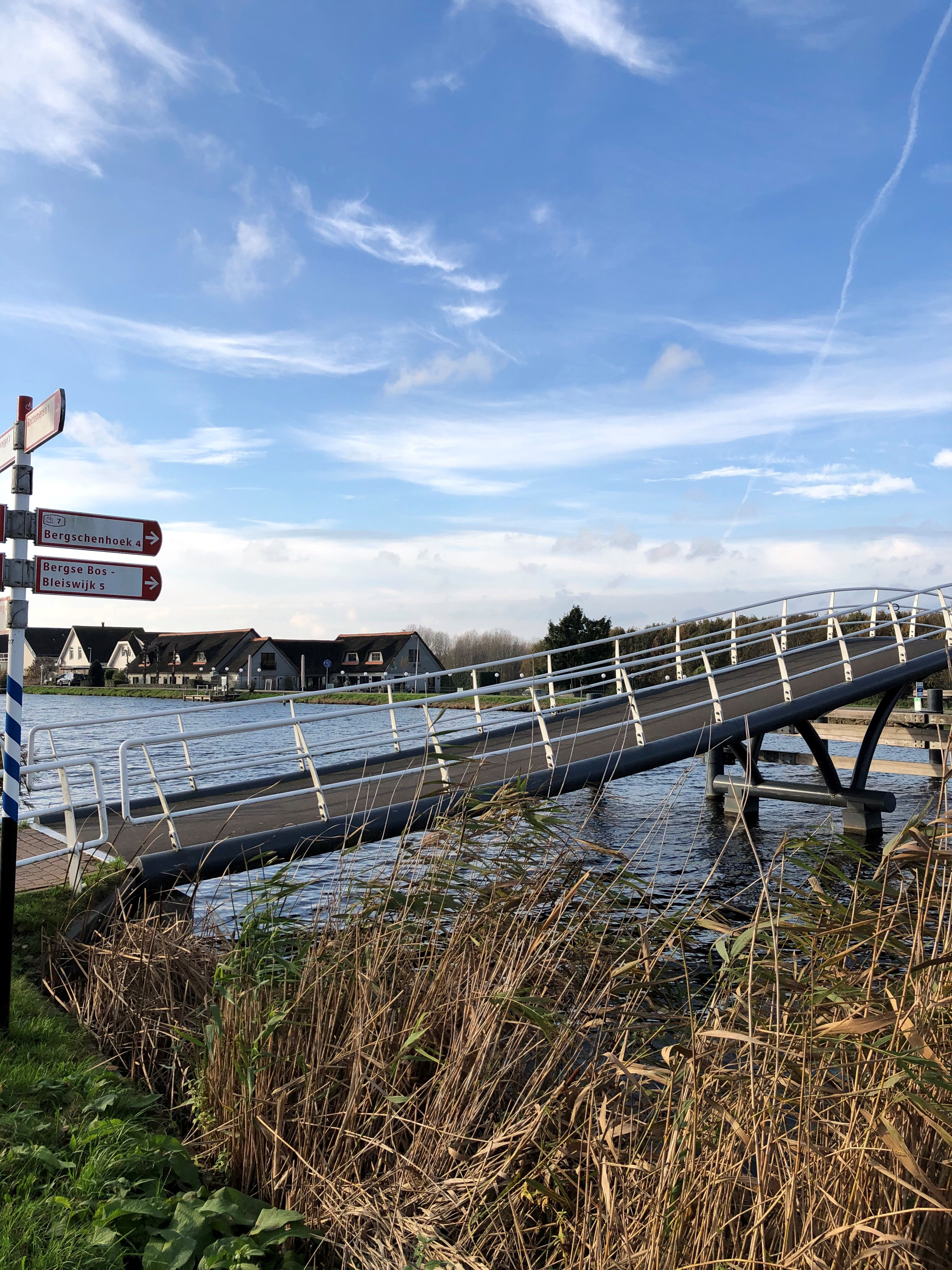
- View over Rotte from the east side

- Location within the Netherlands
- Country: Netherlands
- Province: South Holland
- Municipality: Lansingerland

Population (January 2020)
  - Total: 520
- Time zone: UTC+1 (CET)
  - Summer (DST): UTC+2 (CEST)
- Postal code: 2662
- Area code: 010

Rotte is a vicinity in the municipality of Lansingerland, in the province of South Holland, Netherlands. It used to be part of the former municipality of Bergschenhoek and is located opposite Rotterdam Ommoord.

The hamlet consists of a string of houses situated alongside the river Rotte. North of these houses, the Lage and Hoge Bergse Bos recreational area boasts a golf course, artificial ski-mountain and an outdoor activity center.

== Demographics ==
According to the January 2020 census, its population was 520.
