= Jan Vermaat =

Dutch sculptor (1939–2022)

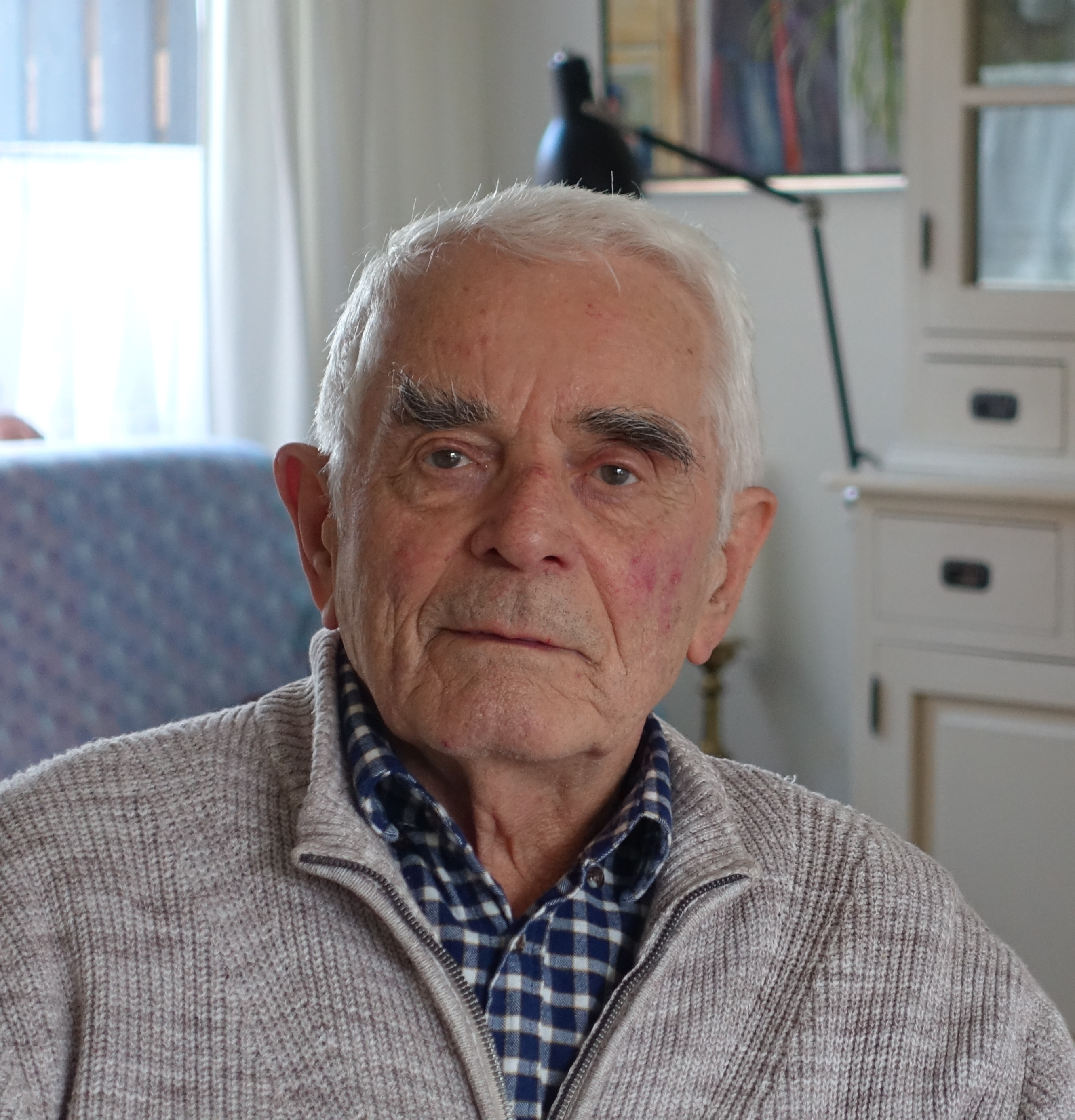
- Vermaat in 2021
- Born: Jan Jacob Vermaat; 21 May 1939; Maasland, Netherlands
- Died: 7 November 2022 (aged 83)
- Occupation(s): Sculptor, draughtsman

Jan Jacob Vermaat (21 May 1939 – 7 November 2022) was a Dutch sculptor and draughtsman from Woerden.

Vermaat's significance for the development of art and culture in Woerden has been described as 'great'. For about fifteen years he took part in international sculptor symposia where he won several prizes. His works are in public areas in Europe and the United States. In the Netherlands, statues of him can be found in: schools, villas, public buildings and public gardens.

While working in Canada, Vermaat made a small change to the official design of the Maple Leaf in the flag of Canada.

== Biography ==
Vermaat was born in Maasland as the eighth and last child of a tailor. His father started working at the Defense clothing depot, which is located in Woerden Castle. When he was three months old, the family started living at the Kruittorenweg in Woerden. Initially he went to the Wilhelmina School, and later to the Emma School. Especially at the Emma school he started to express his sense of art. After primary school, Vermaat followed an evening study at the Academy of Fine Arts in Utrecht, a training institute that was called Artibus at the time. During his studies he worked for the Utrecht University, where he made technical drawings of archaeological history.

The Maple Leaf, including the adjustment of Vermaat

In 1964 he moved temporarily to Toronto, Canada. One of his older sisters lived there for some time. Vermaat started working for Dominion Regalia Ltd., a company that designed clothing and flags. In that period the flag of Canada had to be adjusted a bit by the government, because the old flag of Canada was related to the British flag. The company he worked for got the contract to carry it out. In the official design Vermaat adjusted the Maple Leaf a bit. He made the straight stem a bit wider near the bottom. He did it because he "liked it better". He never heard anything back about his adjustment, but it was adopted in the official Canadian flag.

Vermaat later worked for the Royal Ontario Museum as a decorator, and in his spare time he learned stained glass techniques.

In 1966 he moved back to Woerden, and got a studio from the municipality. In 1969 he met his future wife Tonny Rasing and they moved to Rijnkade 38-I. They had three children, two sons and a daughter. In the period 1972–1985, Vermaat worked as a creative therapist at the General Hospital on the Meeuwenlaan in Woerden.

In 1988 Vermaat received a grant from the Boellaard Fund for a sculpting course in Portugal. The sculptures he made in Portugal were exhibited at the International Sculptor Symposium in Lisbon. It turned out to be the first in a series of international exhibitions.

In 1997 and 2007 Vermaat was the initiator of an international sculptor symposium. Ten European sculptors worked on a series of sculptures that are placed in the public area in Woerden (Van Kempensingel). Vermaat participated in this symposium outside of competition, and the sculptures he made are in the public area in Woerden (Weddesteyn nursing home). In 1997 he received the Woerden Culture Prize for his efforts.

Woerden has a special 'Vermaat walk'. A walking route along ten statues of Vermaat. In 2021 a biography about Jan Vermaat was published with his entire oeuvre.

Vermaat died on 7 November 2022, at the age of 83.

== Gallery ==
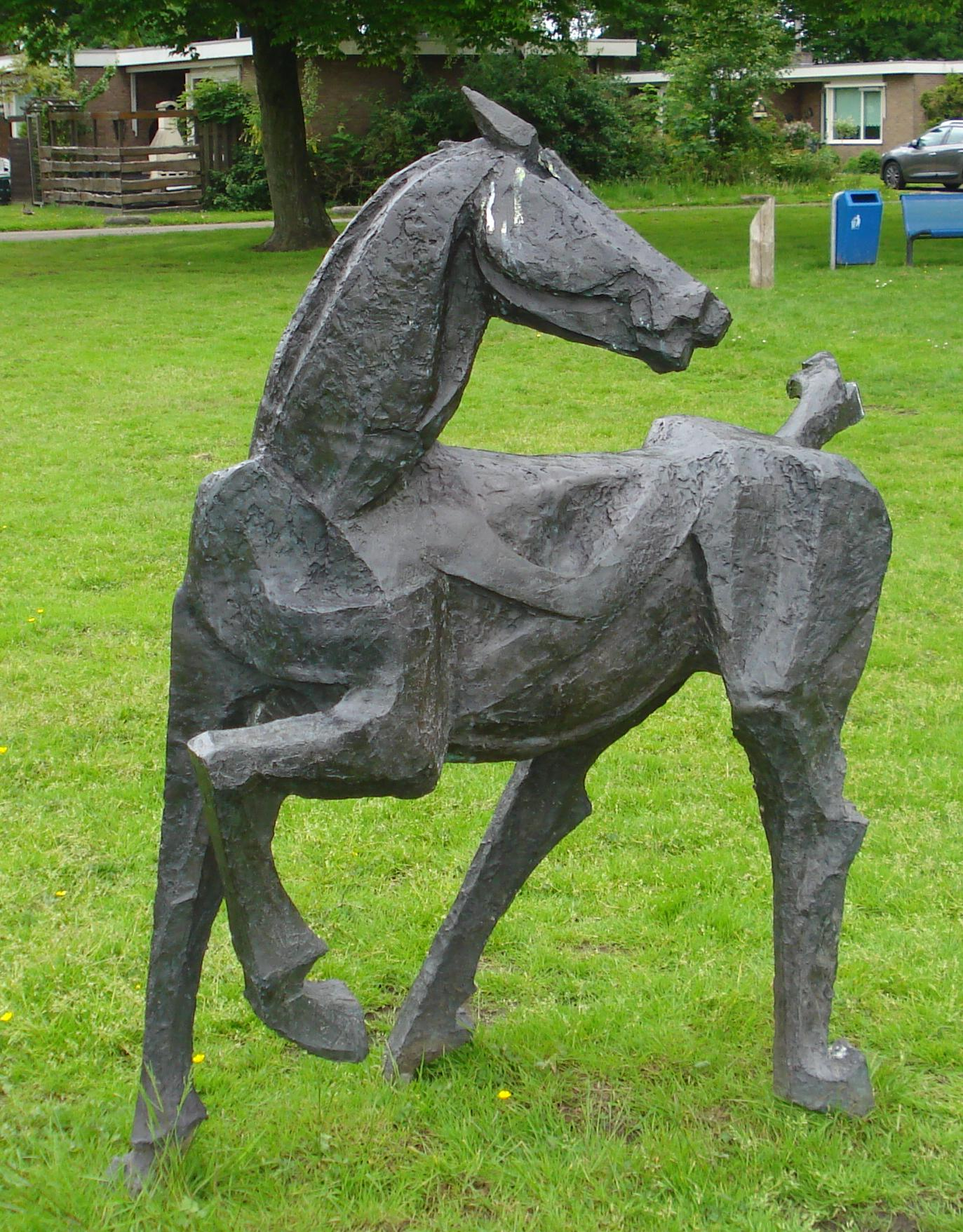
Veulen, Aalsmeer

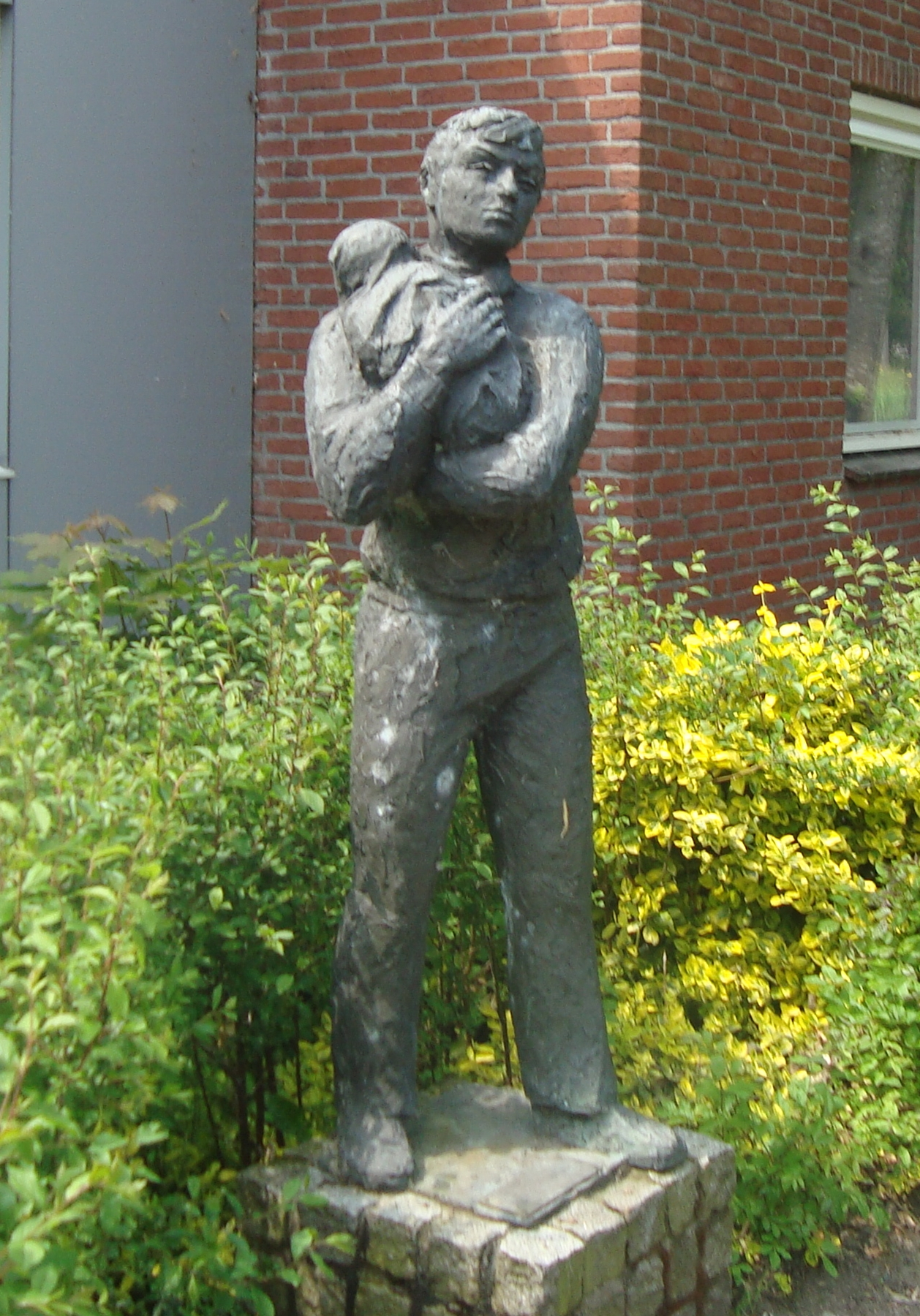
Man met baby (man with baby), Bodegraven

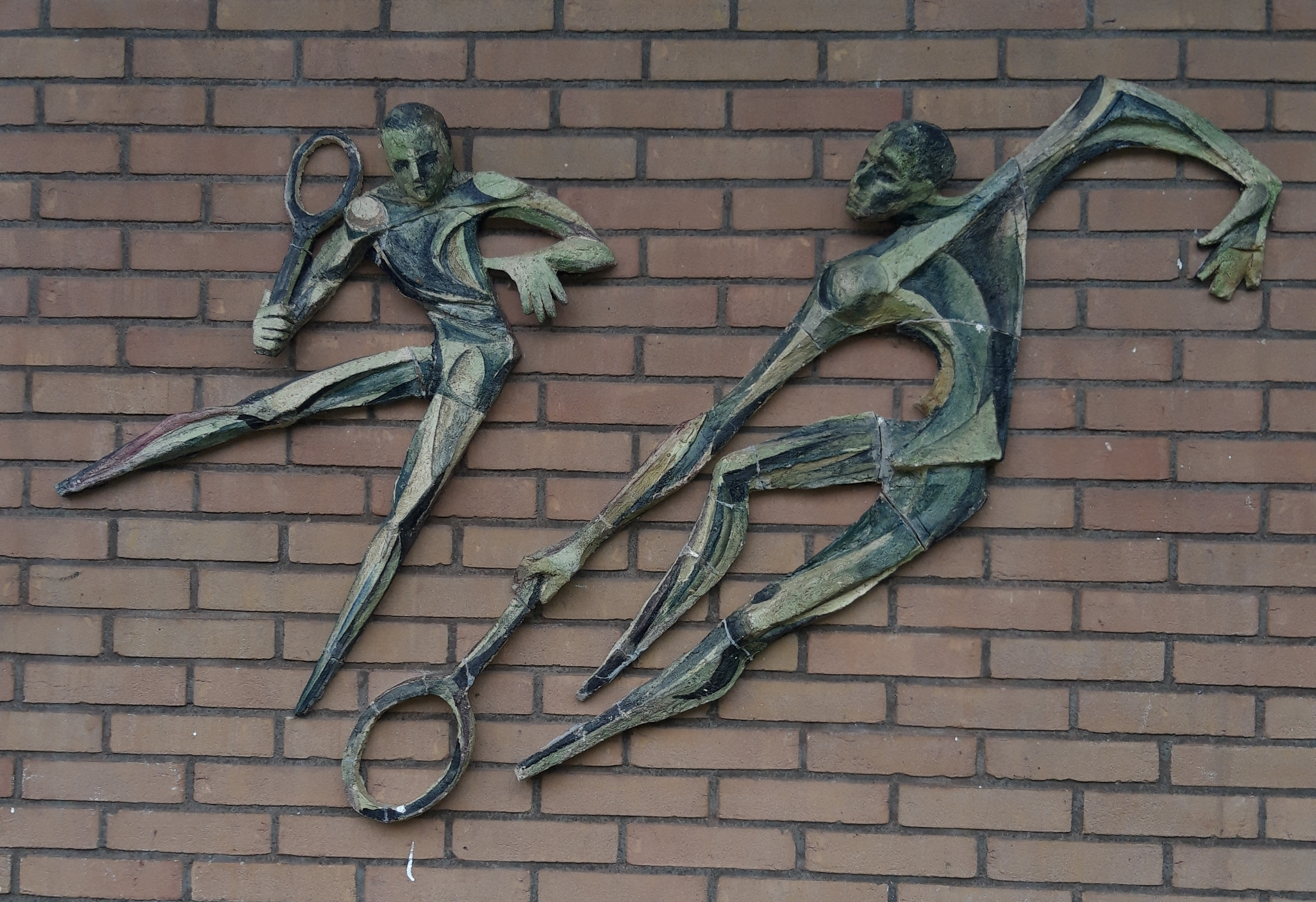
tennis players facade ornament, Woerden

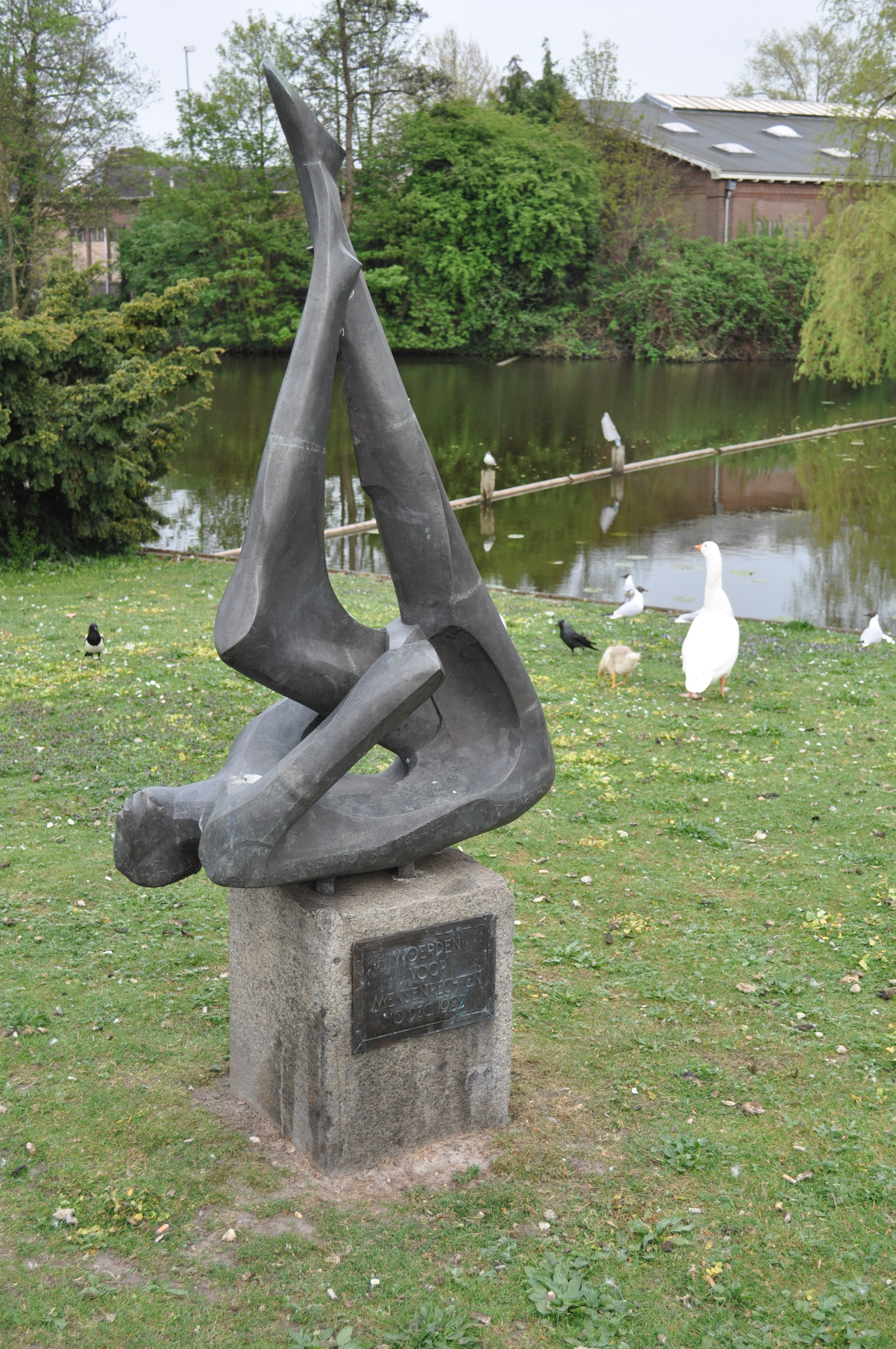
Voor de mensenrechten (for human rights), Woerden

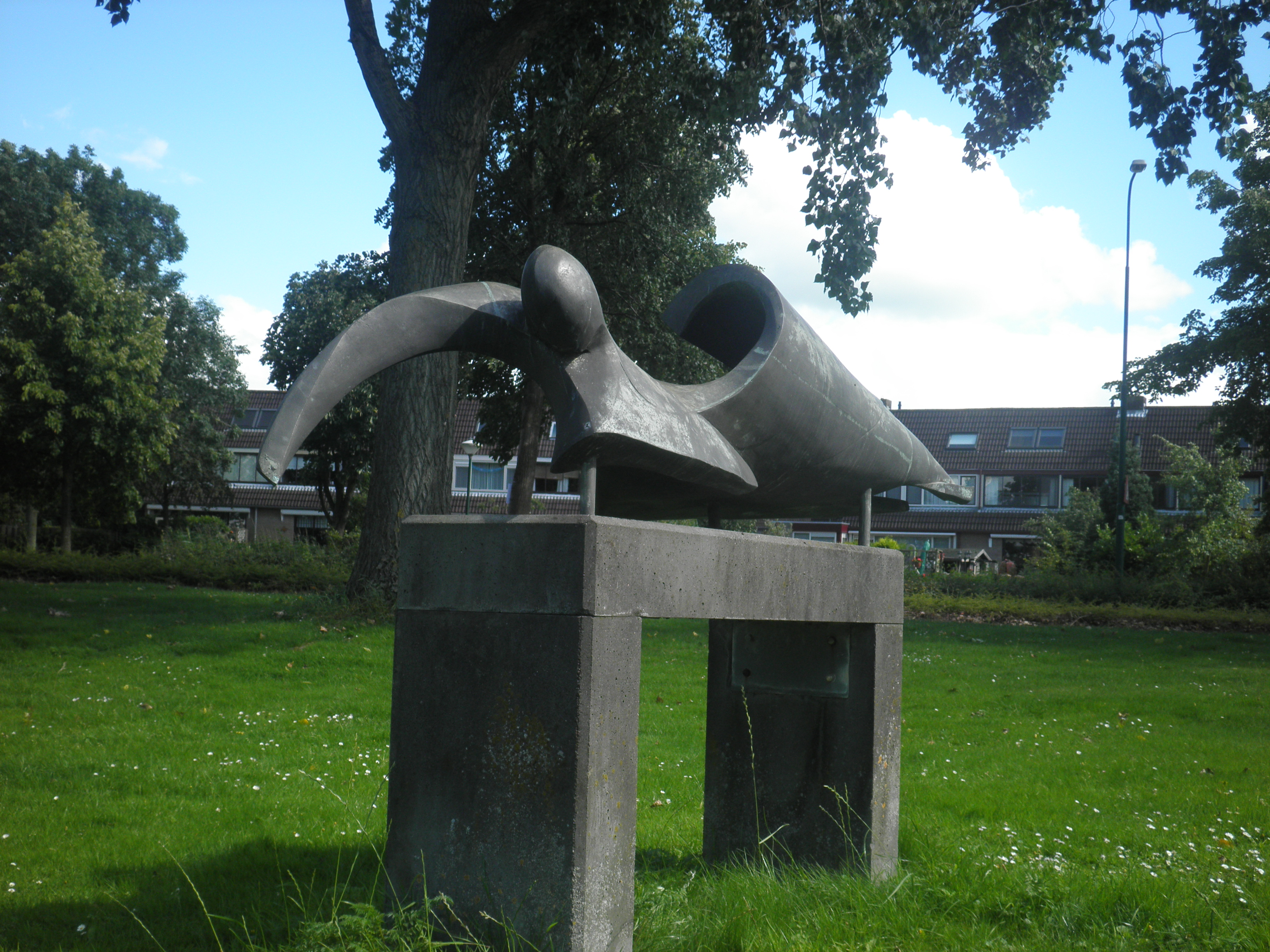
Sculpture of a swimmer, Woerden
