= Peter Nijkamp =

Dutch economist (born 1946)

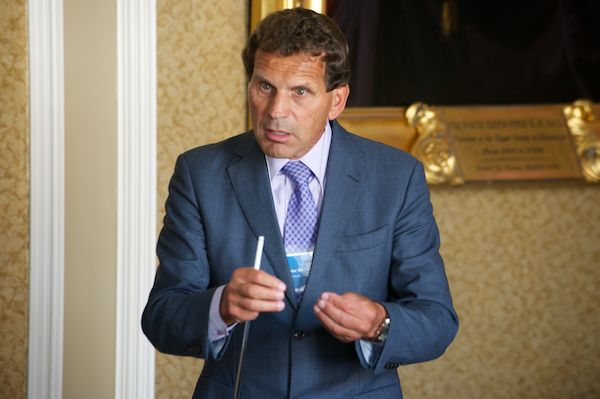
Peter Nijkamp

Peter Nijkamp (born 26 February 1946) is a Dutch economist, Professor of Regional Economics and Economic Geography at the Vrije Universiteit, Amsterdam, the Netherlands, a fellow of the Tinbergen Institute and President of the Governing Board of the Netherlands Research Council (NWO). He is ranked among the top 100 economists in the world according to IDEAS/RePEc, and is by far the most prolific economist. Towards the end of his career at the VU university Nijkamp faced accusations of self-plagiarism and VU-appointed investigators have criticised referencing methods in some of his work.

== Biography ==
Born in Dalfsen, Overijssel, Nijkamp received his MSc in Econometrics and Regional Economics in 1970, and his PhD in Regional Economics in 1972, both from the Erasmus University, Rotterdam, the Netherlands.

He has honorary doctorates from the Vrije Universiteit Brussel and the National Technical University of Athens. He is a winner of the Spinozapremie (1996), the European Prize in Regional Science, and Founder's Medal of the Regional Science Association International.

He has been member of the Royal Netherlands Academy of Arts and Sciences since 1987.

== Controversy ==
In 2013, the PhD thesis of one of his students was withdrawn one day before the scheduled defence. It consisted almost entirely of papers jointly written with Nijkamp. An internal investigation at the VU determined that some of these papers were recycled versions of yet earlier papers, with other co-authors, who had not been cited properly and this might be considered a form of plagiarism. The VU's rector, Frank van der Duyn Schouten, stated that Nijkamp had acted improperly but had not committed plagiarism. The student involved was allowed to adapt the thesis and the graduation ceremony took place in 2014.

Following extensive press reports that claimed to have found cases of self-plagiarism in Nijkamp's work and an analysis by an anonymous whistleblower, the VU announced it would investigate Nijkamp's entire publishing record. It would also inquire with the Royal Netherlands Academy of Arts and Sciences on the boundary between self-plagiarism and "self-citation".

The investigation committee under Jaap Zwemmer concluded in March 2015 that Nijkamp had re-used earlier publications in new papers on a certain scale, without proper referencing and the committee qualified this as "questionable research practice". The VU accepted some, but not all, of the committee conclusions. In a separate investigation the Dutch National Board on Research Integrity found Nijkamp "careless" but not in breach of scientific integrity. It also found university regulations on self-citation insufficient at the time. Nijkamp himself stated that the investigation committee's methodology and selection of publications is too thin a base for any conclusions.

In May 2016, De Volkskrant reported that the Public Prosecuter sought to prosecute the anonymous complainant. The complainant was said to have significantly damaged the doctoral candidate’s career through defamation and slander. The prosecution service stated that it had sufficient indications to identify the anonymous complainant, partly based on suspicions raised by the doctoral candidate and IP addresses from which the complainant had sent various emails.

== Publications ==
His books include

- Social Change and Sustainable Transport (with William Black, 2002, Indiana University Press)
- Public Facilities Planning (with Lili Kiminami and Kenneth Button, 2007, Edward Elgar)
- Spatial Dynamics, Networks and Modelling (with Aura Reggiani, 2006, Edward Elgar).

His journal papers include

- Second-best congestion pricing: The case of an untolled alternative (with Eric Verhoef and Piet Rietveld, 1996, Journal of Urban Economics),
- Qualitative multicriteria analysis for environmental management (with Giuseppe Munda and Piet Rietveld, 1994, Ecological Economics),
- Price and income elasticities in residential water demand (with Jasper Dalhuisen, Raymond Florax and Henri de Groot, 2003, Land Economics).
