= Jaap Zwemmer =

Dutch fiscal jurist (born 1945)

Jacobus Willibrordus "Jaap" Zwemmer (born 1945) is a Dutch fiscal jurist. He was a professor of tax law at the University of Amsterdam between 1980 and 2006. He also served as interim rector magnificus of the university in 2007. Zwemmer furthermore was a part time tax judge and wrote fiscal opinions. After his retirement he dealt with academic integrity matters. He additionally spent spells on the supervisory boards of various medical institutions.

== Early life ==
Zwemmer was born in Assendelft in 1945. He studied notarial and fiscal law. Zwemmer obtained his PhD at the University of Amsterdam in law in 1975 under professor J. van Soest with a dissertation titled: De fiscale gevolgen van de vervreemding van genotsrechten.

== Career ==
In 1980 he became professor of tax law at the University of Amsterdam. During his time at the university he served as dean of the faculty of law, as well as the faculty of economics and econometrics. In November 2006 he took up early retirement. On his departure he received a festschrift. Zwemmer was the last full-time professor of tax law at the university. After Paul F. van der Heijden left as rector magnificus of the university in January 2007, Zwemmer functioned as interim rector magnificus until the appointment of Dymph van den Boom on 1 October 2007.

After his retirement he served as counselor for academic integrity at the University of Amsterdam. In 2011 he dealt with a case regarding a book publication of Peter Rijpkema in which Zwemmer advised adding other authors to the book cover. In 2012 he also supported the idea of a scientific oath as a way to stimulate awareness for scientific responsibility. In 2014 he was leader of a commission set up by the Vrije Universiteit Amsterdam to look into the academic work of Peter Nijkamp after allegations of self-plagiarism. In March 2015 the commission published its findings, declaring that Nijkamp had used large abstractions of his own work in new work without providing references and called it "questionable research practice". Nijkamp called the rapport an "empty shell" and "very badly performed work". Zwemmer defended the work of the commission.

Zwemmer also worked as part-time tax judge at the Courts of Appeal of 's-Hertogenbosch, Arnhem and Amsterdam. A 1995 article by P. Wattel named Zwemmer as the most recused judge in the field. While working as professor Zwemmer wrote around six fiscal opinions in the form of scientific analyses for tax advisors each year, after his retirement the number lowered to around four. He did not have own clients.

From 1985 to 2005 he was supervisor of the Amsterdam Academic Medical Center. Early 2018 he became chair of the supervisory board of the Elkerliek Ziekenhuis. From 2020 to 2022 he was interim chair of the supervisory board of the Zaans Medisch Centrum. Between July 2020 and 1 December 2023 he was interim chair of the supervisory board of the Stichting Zorgpartners Friesland, a in Friesland based health foundation.

Zwemmer was elected a member of the Royal Netherlands Academy of Arts and Sciences in 1997.

== Positions ==
Over a thirty-year period Zwemmer frequently voiced his opinion on fiscal matters in articles and columns. Zwemmer has argued against double-hatted roles of professor of tax law and tax advisor/tax consultant and has stated it leads to self-censorship and not sharing relevant information. He also signaled a distorted balance in the number of professors with a full-time position and a large number of part-time professors. He noted that the part-time professors only took part in academic life and responsibilities to a limited extend. He argued for an improved balance, with more full-time professors.

In 2015 Zwemmer stated that Fred Teeven, whilst he was working for the Public Prosecution Service, was complicit in money laundering when he made a deal with criminal Cees H. In the wake of the revealing of the Panama Papers in 2016 Zwemmer stated that the case could lead to an improved tax morale. In 2016, after previously secret documents were unvealed about a tax compensation for the House of Orange-Nassau, Zwemmer stated that it was highly unusual and not correct.
