= Maasland =

- Village
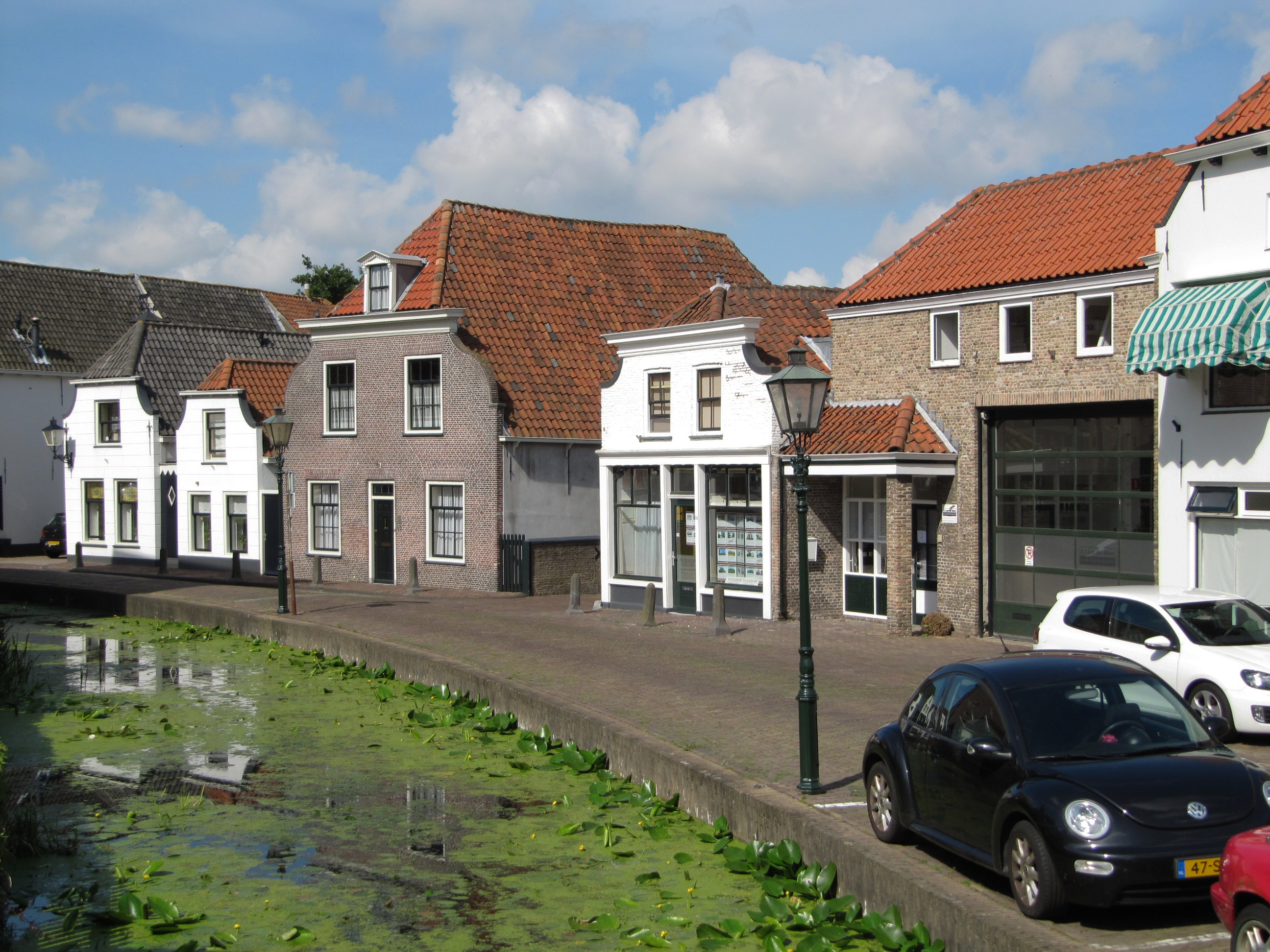
- Maasland

- Flag Coat of arms

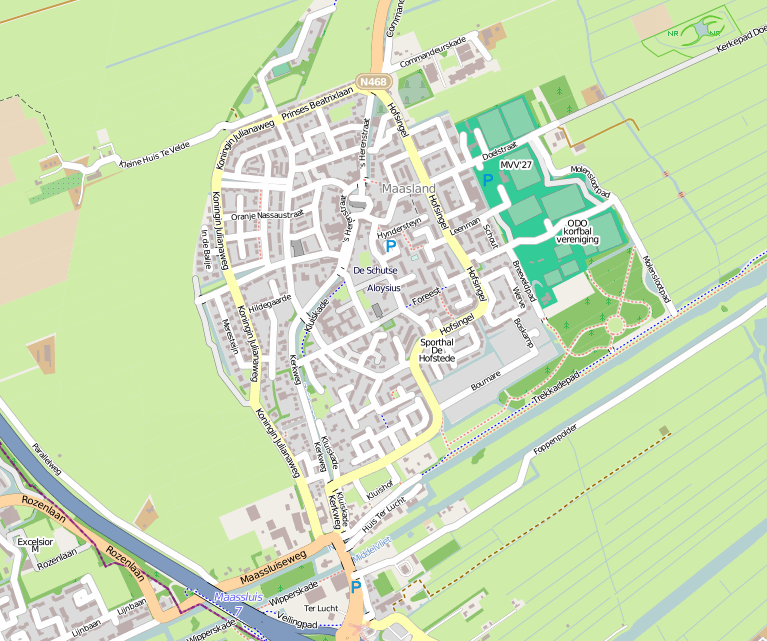

- Location within the Netherlands
- Coordinates: 51°56′7″N 4°16′10″E
- Country: Netherlands
- Province: South Holland
- Municipality: Midden-Delfland
- Time zone: UTC+1 (CET)
  - Summer (DST): UTC+2 (CEST)
- Postal code: 3155

Maasland (population: 6,844) is a village in the western Netherlands, in the province of South Holland. It lies in the municipality (gemeente) of Midden-Delfland and covers an area of 24.42 km^{2} (of which 0.64 km^{2} water). It is located in a countryside area with dairy farms that is surrounded by various urban concentrations, namely the city of Rotterdam, the municipality of Westland (area with intensive greenhouse horticulture activities), and the towns of Vlaardingen and Maassluis.

== History ==
From approximately 700, the area was populated, presumably by Frisians. It was first the royal domain, and later went to the local counts. During the later period, an area of about 1,000 hectares (2,500 acres) was made dry and suitable for living. The first signs of a community at the current location of the village started back in 985 when the area was given by the Emperor Otto III to Graaf Dirk II and a church was built. After severe floodings during the 12th century, the Maasdijk was rebuilt and the village centre relocated to its current site. In 1241 Graaf Willem II let the German Teutonic Knights draw on the territory of Maasland. Furthermore, in 1243 a nobleman, Diederik van Coldenhove, gave all his property in Oude Campspolder, north of the current village center, to the Order, and a commandery was established there to manage the properties of the Order in Maasland.

In 1450 the 'Poldermolen' (translation: Poldermill) was built in Maasland.

During the war between Spain and the Netherlands a huge area of the Netherlands was flooded which was part of the strategy of Willem van Oranje. In 1574, these floodings affected Maasland, and once again the village was flooded. It took a couple of years before the villagewas rebuilt and in 1614 part of the village Maasland (which included the Maeslandsluys) gained independency and is known as the town Maassluis.

Until the new village hall was built in 1874 meetings of the village council meetings were held in the tavern 'de Pynas'.

In the late 20th century the village of Maasland and its surrounding communities were governed as the municipality (gemeente) of Maasland, with most governmental functions based in the village.

In 2004, the village of Maasland became part of the municipality (gemeente) of Midden-Delfland upon the merger of the municipality of Maasland and the municipality of Schipluiden.

== Places of interest ==
- The 'Oude Kerk' (translation: Old Church (founded circa 1400), burned down during the celebrations for freedom after World War II. Restored in 1954.
- Tavern 'de Pynas', which is still a café.
- Museum 'de Schilpen', an eighty-year-old grocery store in its original state. Now a museum.
- The 'Two Mills'

== In the news ==
- According to Elsevier (a Dutch magazine) Maasland was the wealthiest place in the Netherlands during 2004.
- In August 2004 the KNMI (Dutch institute for Weather forecasting) reported an extreme high level of rainfall in the Netherlands. In the month August 325mm of rainfall was registered by the weatherstation in Maasland, the highest since the KNMI started measuring the rainfall in 1900.

== Notable people from Maasland ==
- Mats Deijl, footballer
- Michiel Smit, far-right politician
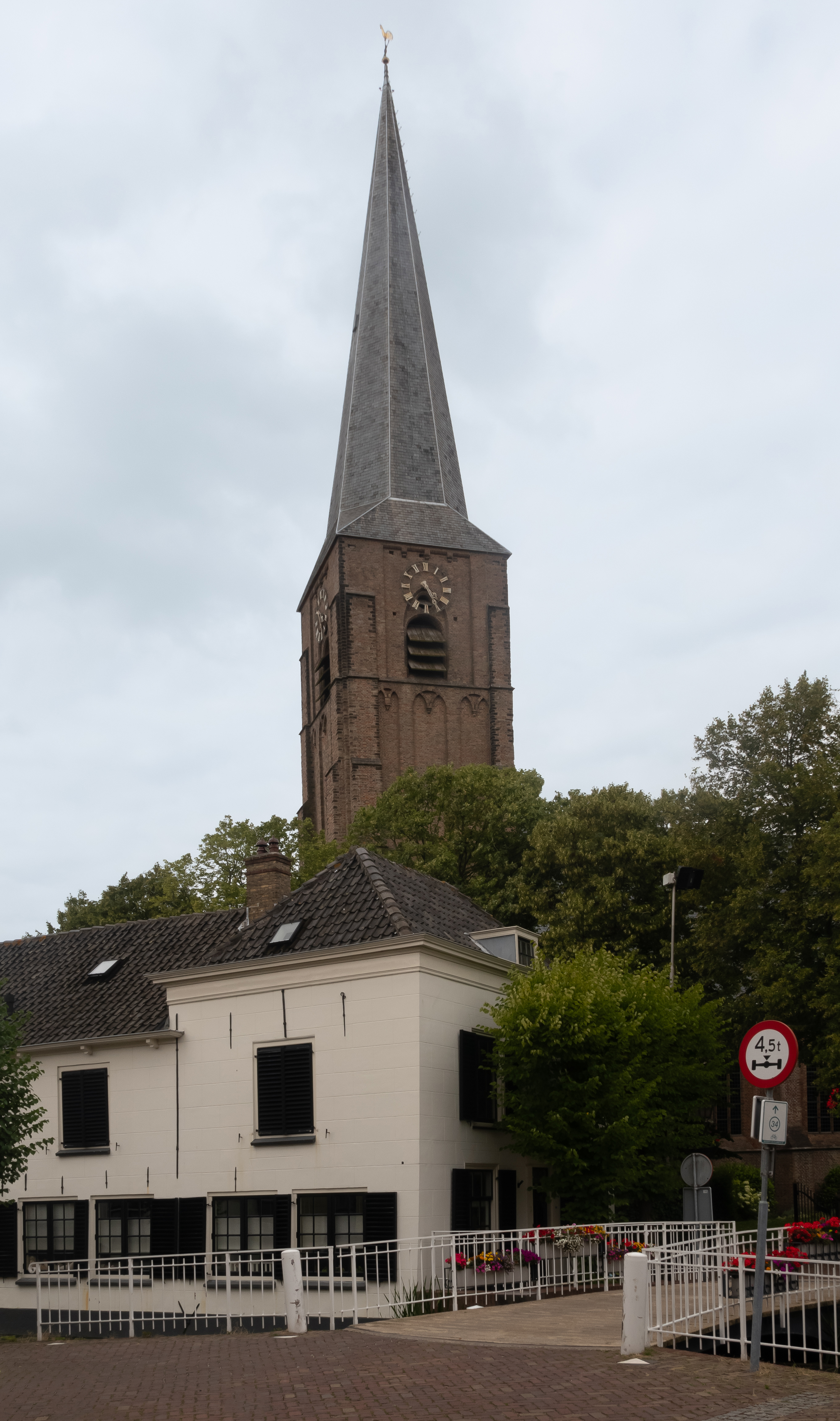
Maasland, churchtower (de Oude Kerk)

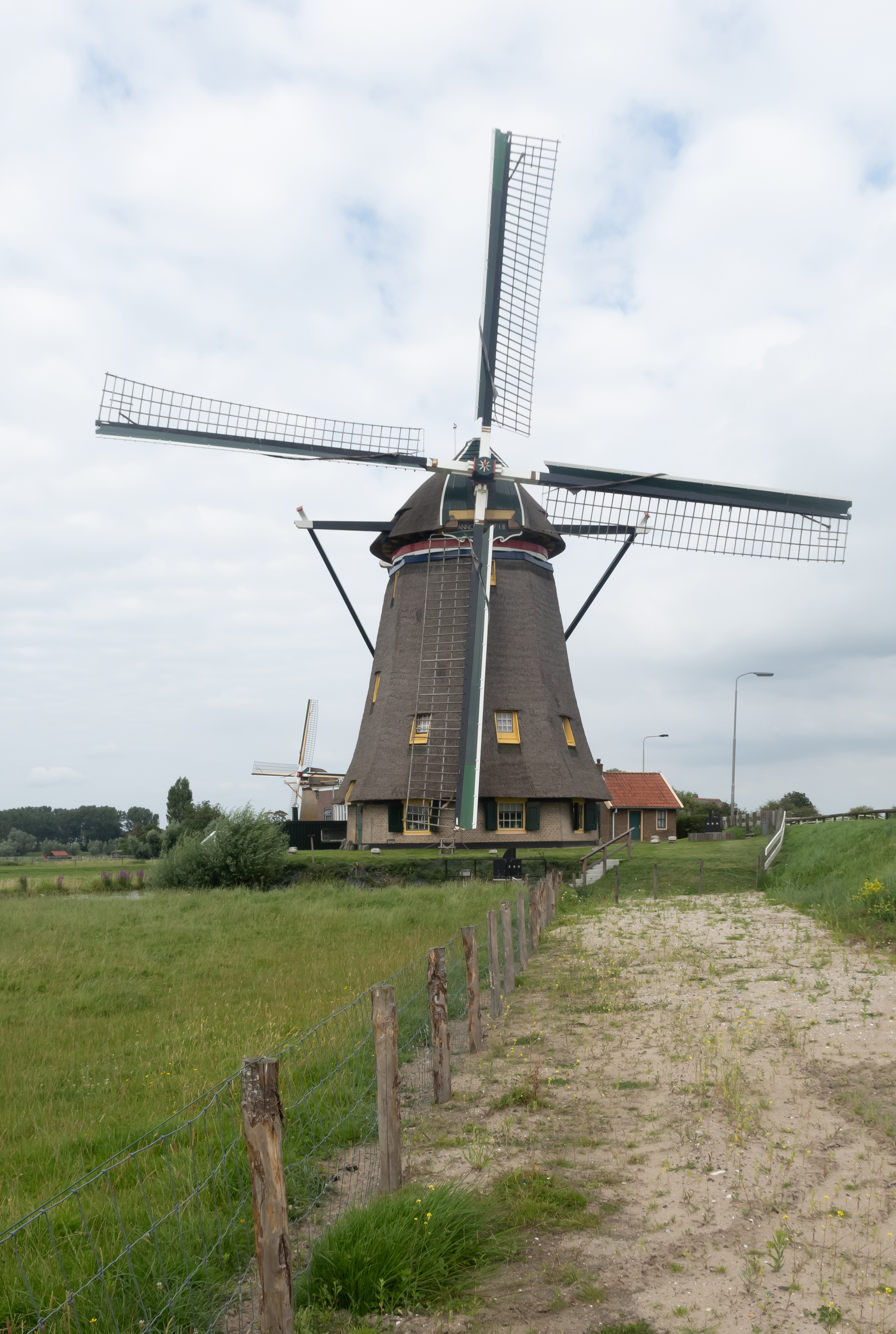
Maasland, windmill: de Dijkmolen

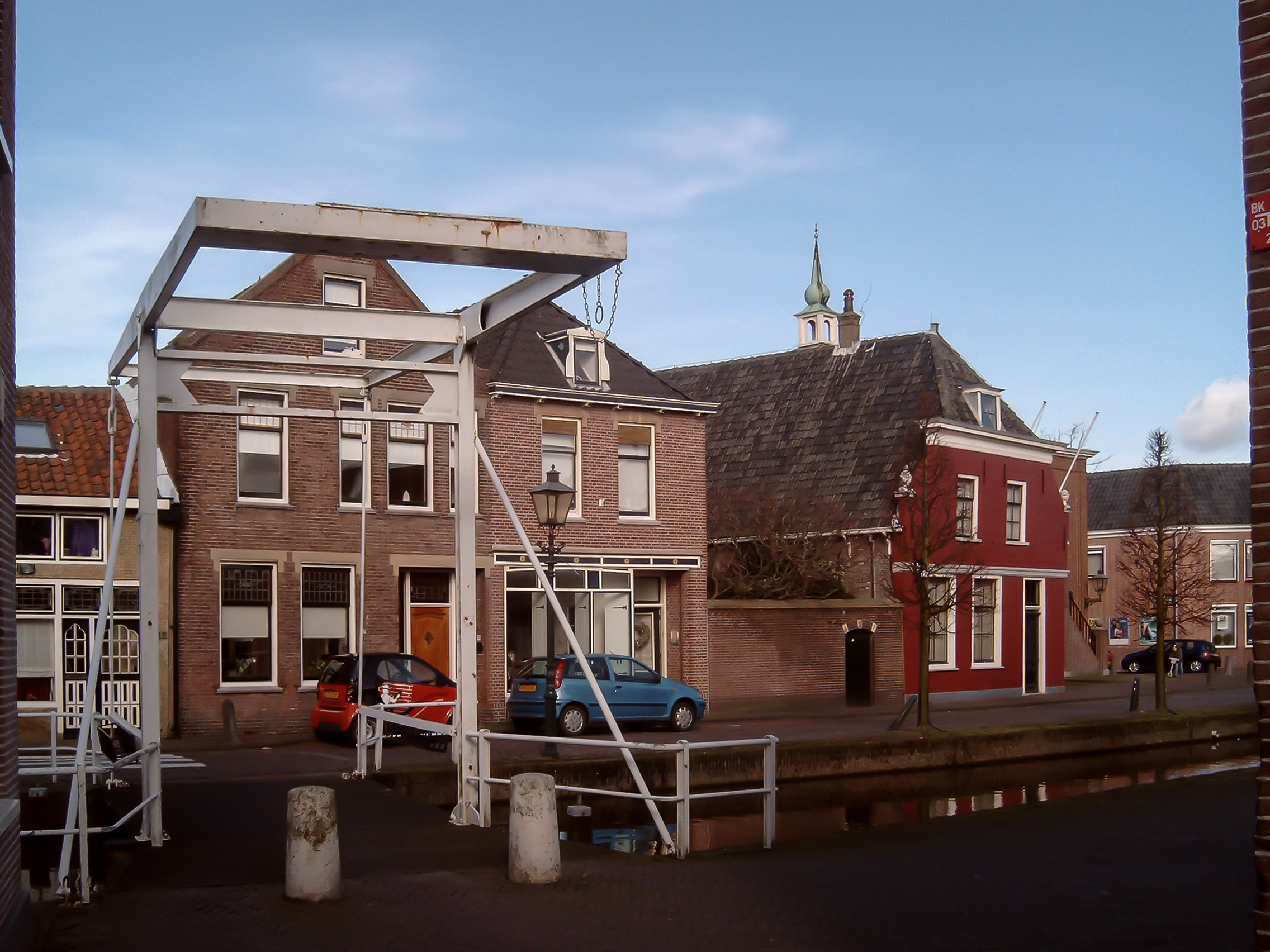
Maasland, drawbridge

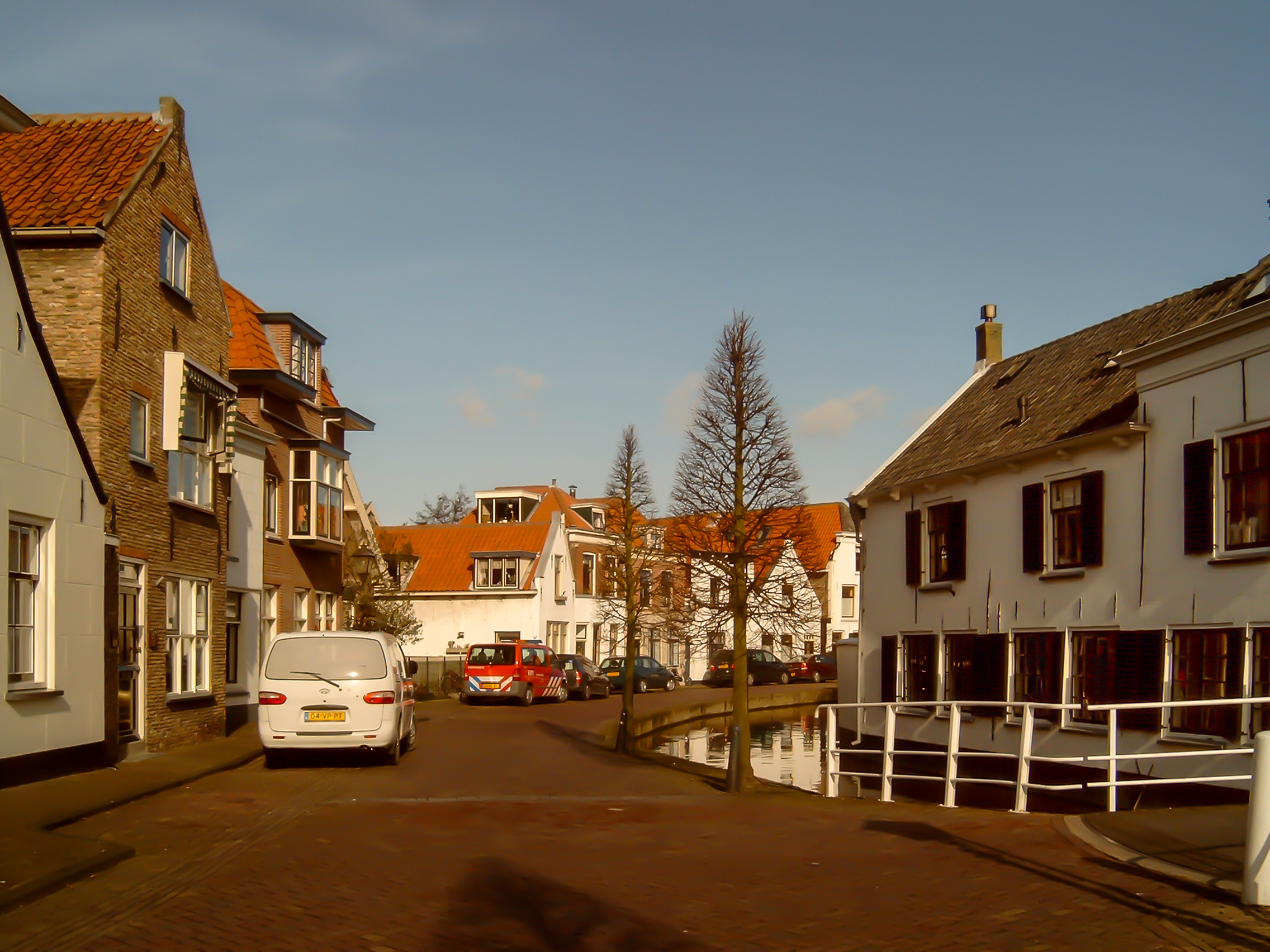
Maasland, the central canal

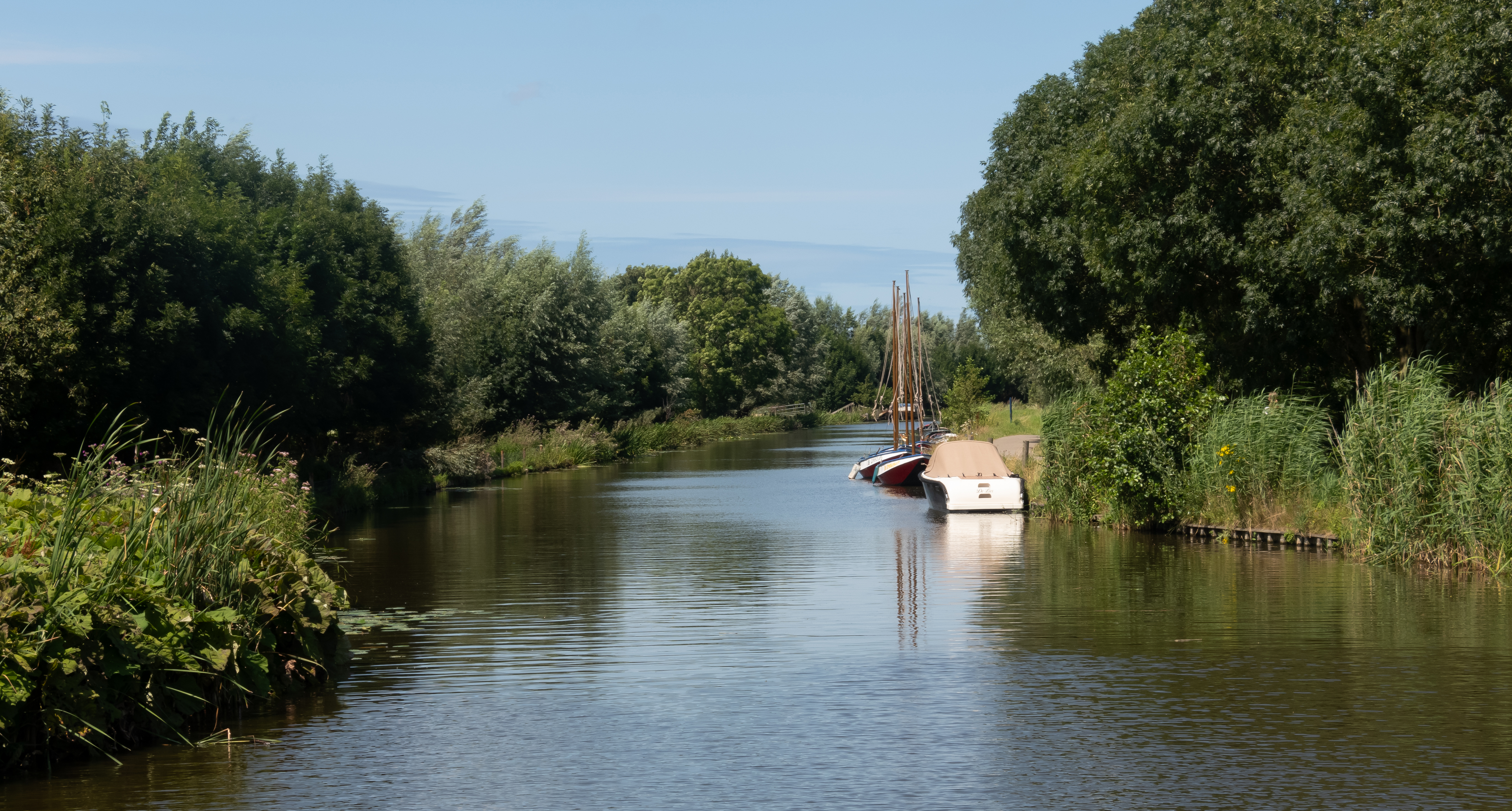
Maasland, canal along the Kwakelweg at the ferry
