= Piet Rietveld =

Dutch economist (1952–2013)

Pieter (Piet) Rietveld (15 December 1952 – 1 November 2013) was a Dutch economist and Professor in Transport Economics at the Vrije Universiteit, Amsterdam, and a fellow at the Tinbergen Institute. He was among the top researchers in economic geography according to IDEAS/RePEc.

== Biography ==
Born in Berkel en Rodenrijs in 1952, Rietveld studied econometrics at Erasmus University, Rotterdam and received his PhD in economics at Vrije Universiteit, Amsterdam in 1980 with a thesis entitled "Multiple objective decision methods and regional planning."

Rietveld had started his academic career at the International Institute for Applied Systems Analysis, Austria, and was research co-ordinator at Universitas Kristen Satya Wacana in Salatiga, Indonesia. In 1990 he was appointed Professor in Transport Economics at the Vrije Universiteit, Amsterdam, at the Faculty of Economics and Business Administration. Rietveld was elected a member of the Royal Netherlands Academy of Arts and Sciences in 2011. He was a member of Academia Europaea.

== Work ==
Rietveld's research was focussed on transport and regional development; valuing the quality of transport services; the economics of public transport; modelling land use; and methods for policy analysis. Rietveld regularly appeared in the media.

== Publications ==
Rietveld has authored and co-authored numerous publications his fields of expertise. Books, a selection:

- 1979. Het stuur uit handen? : een reeks bijdragen op het terrein van ruimtelijke mobiliteit en beleid. With Peter Nijkamp (eds.) Leiden : Stenfert Kroese
- 1980. Multiple objective decision methods and regional planning. Amsterdam [etc.] : North-Holland Publishing Co
- 1998/2012. Is Transport Infrastructure Effective?: Transport Infrastructure and Accessibility - Impacts on the Space Economy. With Frank Bruinsma. Springer Verlag.

Articles, a selection:

- Peter Nijkamp, Piet Rietveld, and Henk Voogd. Multicriteria evaluation in physical planning. Amsterdam: North-Holland, 1990.
- Erik Verhoef, Peter Nijkamp, and Piet Rietveld. "Second-best congestion pricing: the case of an untolled alternative." Journal of Urban Economics 40.3 (1996): 279–302.
- De Groot, H. L. F., Linders, G. J., Rietveld, P., & Subramanian, U. (2004). The institutional determinants of bilateral trade patterns. Kyklos, 57(1), 103–123.
