= Berkel en Rodenrijs =

- Town
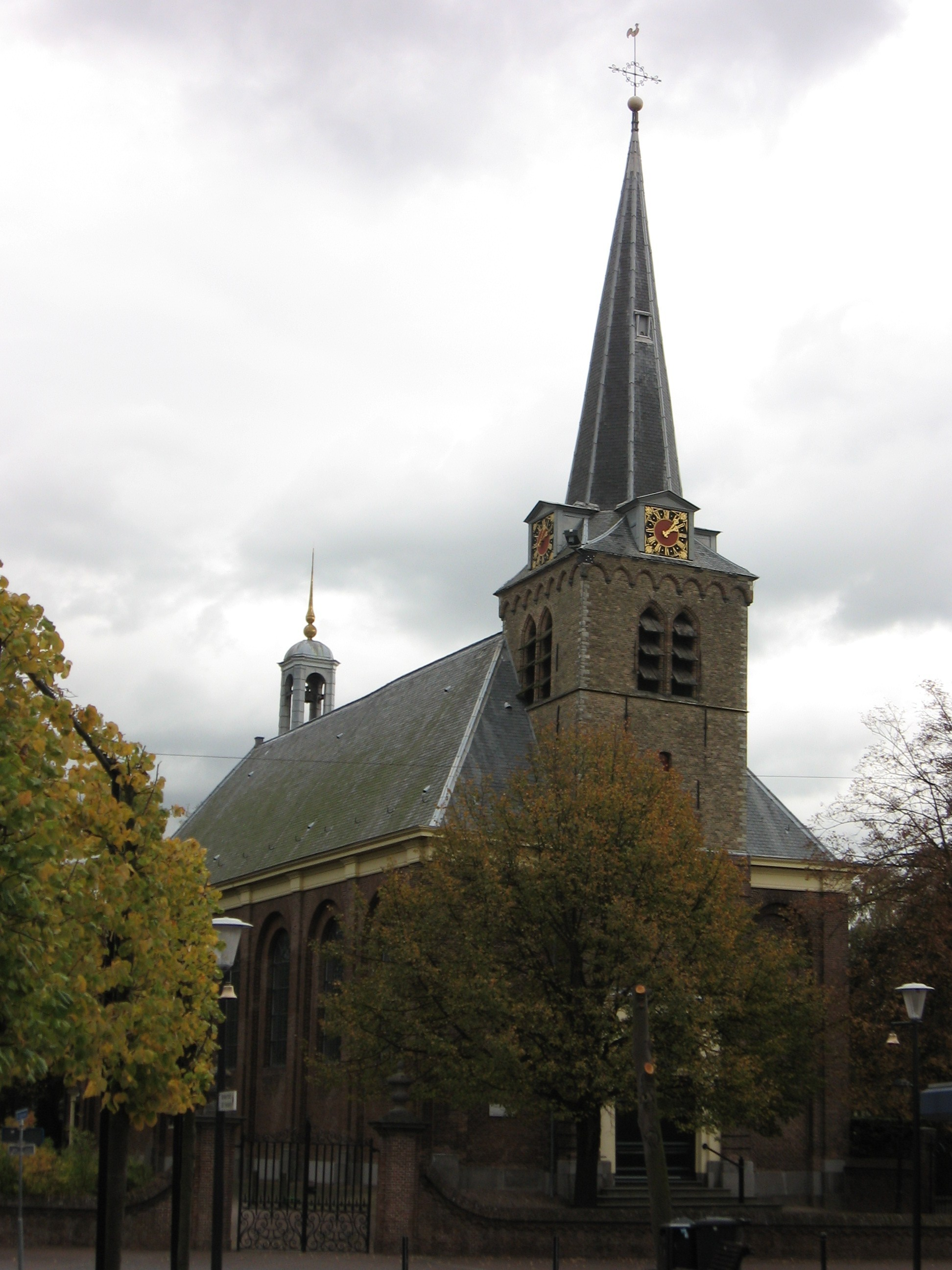
- Dorpskerk

- Flag Seal

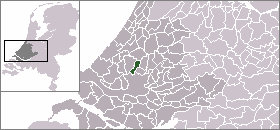

- Location within the Netherlands
- Country: The Netherlands
- Province: South Holland
- Municipality: Lansingerland

Area
  - Total: 18.91 km^{2} (7.30 sq mi)
  - Land: 18.62 km^{2} (7.19 sq mi)
  - Water: 0.29 km^{2} (0.11 sq mi)
- Elevation: −5 m (−16 ft)

Population (January 2023)
  - Total: 33,445
  - Density: 1,796/km^{2} (4,652/sq mi)
- Time zone: UTC+1 (CET)
  - Summer (DST): UTC+2 (CEST)
- Postal code: 2651-2652
- Area code: 010
- Roads and Rail: N209, N470, N471, RandstadRail

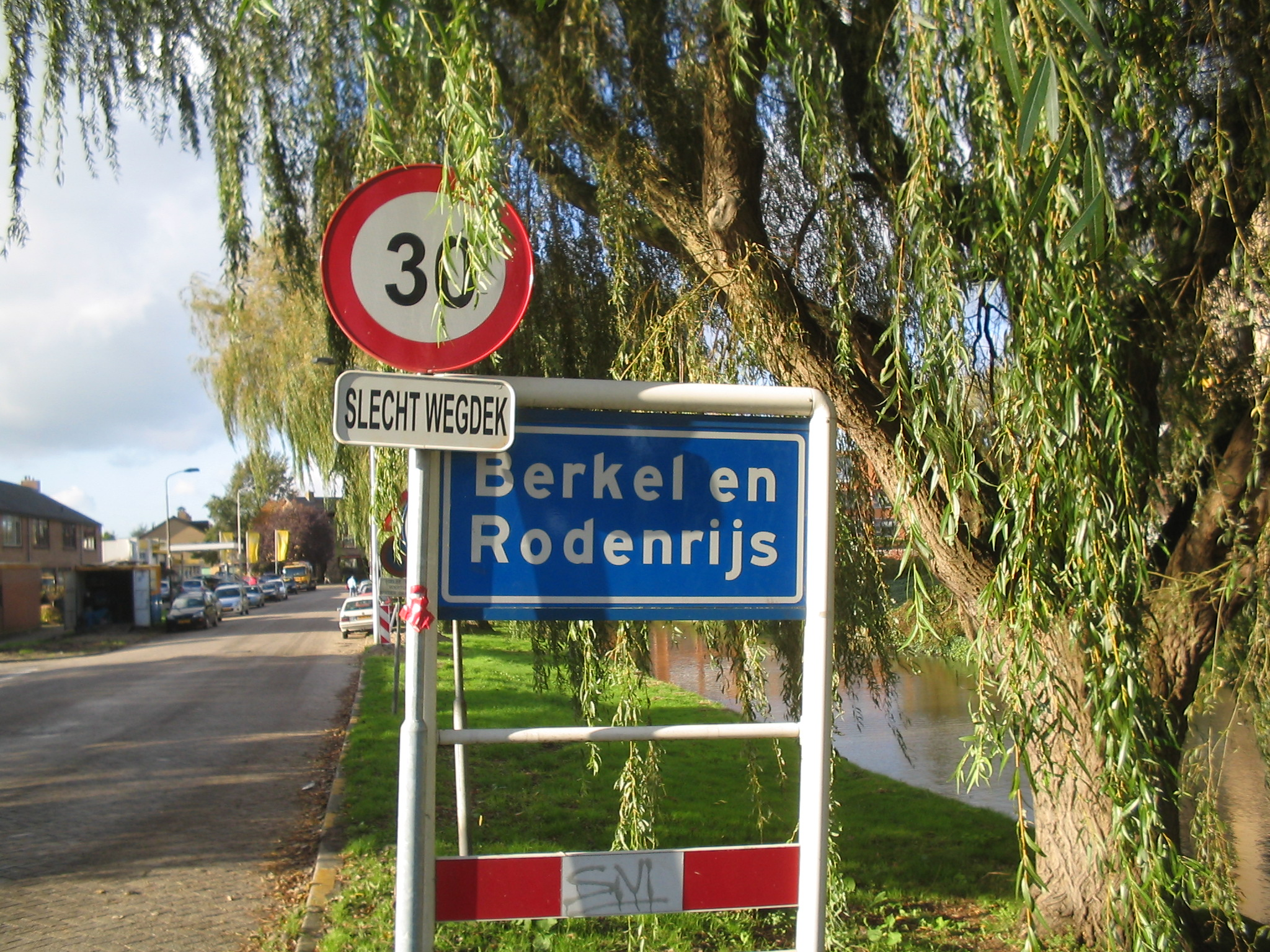
Town sign

Berkel en Rodenrijs (Dutch pronunciation: [ˈbɛrkəl ɛn ˈroːdə(n)rɛis]) is a town and former municipality in the municipality of Lansingerland, in the province of South Holland, The Netherlands. The town is very close to Rotterdam.

== History ==
Berkel en Rodenrijs was founded in the twelfth century. Its character changed across the centuries. Prior to its development, the land consisted of peat soil, which was cultivated for the production of turf. This cultivation resulted in the appearance of moors. During the 18th century the moors were drained and agricultural use of polder land commenced. The years that followed resulted in significant changes to the town due to residential and commercial building developments. (source: Gemeente Lansingerland)

In 1850 the town had a population count of 1,250, which by 1950 had expanded to 5,700.

The municipality of Tempel was abolished in 1855 and added to Berkel en Rodenrijs.

On 1 January 2007, the town was merged with neighbouring towns Bergschenhoek and Bleiswijk to form the new municipality of Lansingerland. In January 2008, the former municipality had a population of 22,626 (source: official municipality guide), and covered an area of 18.91 km^{2} (7.30 sq mi) of which 0.29 km^{2} (0.11 sq mi) is water.

In 2016 plans were announced for Berkel Centrum West and construction started in April 2021. The plans included houses, supermarkets, retail establishments, restaurants and cultural establishments.

== Public transport ==
- RandstadRail Line E
- RET has provided bus services since 9 December 2012: bus numbers 170, 173 and 174.

Bus 170 runs along a new dedicated bus route through Lansingerland, known as the ZoRo bus ( Zoetermeer - Rotterdam ). This route goes from Zoetermeer Central Station to Rodenrijs Station.

== Notable people ==
=== Born in Berkel en Rodenrijs ===
- Phil Bloom (born 27 November 1945), artist
- Eimert van Middelkoop (born 14 February 1949), politician (ChristianUnion, minister of Defence 2007–2010)
- Piet Rietveld (1952–2013) professor of transport economics at Vrije Universiteit Amsterdam
- Victor Scheffers (born 22 May 1960), Olympic rower for the Netherlands, 1980 Summer Games.
- Tim Vincken (born 12 September 1986), professional footballer for Feyenoord
- Peter-Paul Pigmans (31 January 1961 – 27 August 2003), Dutch gabber music producer, best known for his production under the pseudonym 3 Steps Ahead.

=== Lived in Berkel en Rodenrijs ===
- Annie M.G. Schmidt (20 May 1911 – 21 May 1995) Dutch poet and well-known author of children's books lived in Berkel en Rodenrijs for some time during the mid-1960s.
- Wibi Soerjadi (born 2 March 1970) pianist and composer
- Ria Visser (born 20 July 1961), all-round speed skater, National Speed Skating Champion (1980, 1983, 1984, 1985,1986), Silver medal 1500m. 1980 Lake Placid Winter Olympics.
- Kiki Bertens (born 10 December 1991) WTA professional tennis player, reached number 4 in the world 5/2019.

== Gallery ==
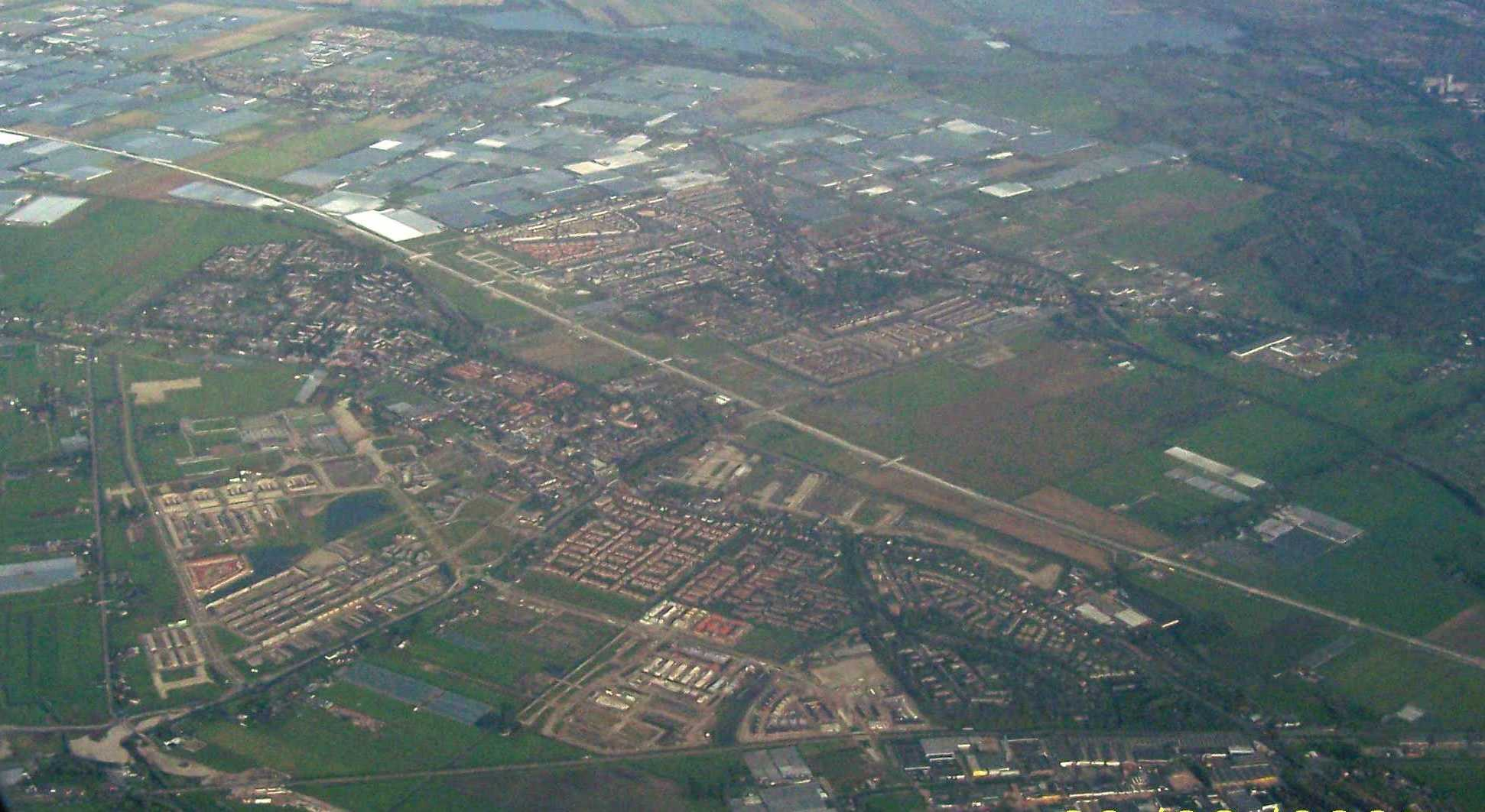
Aerial view of the town

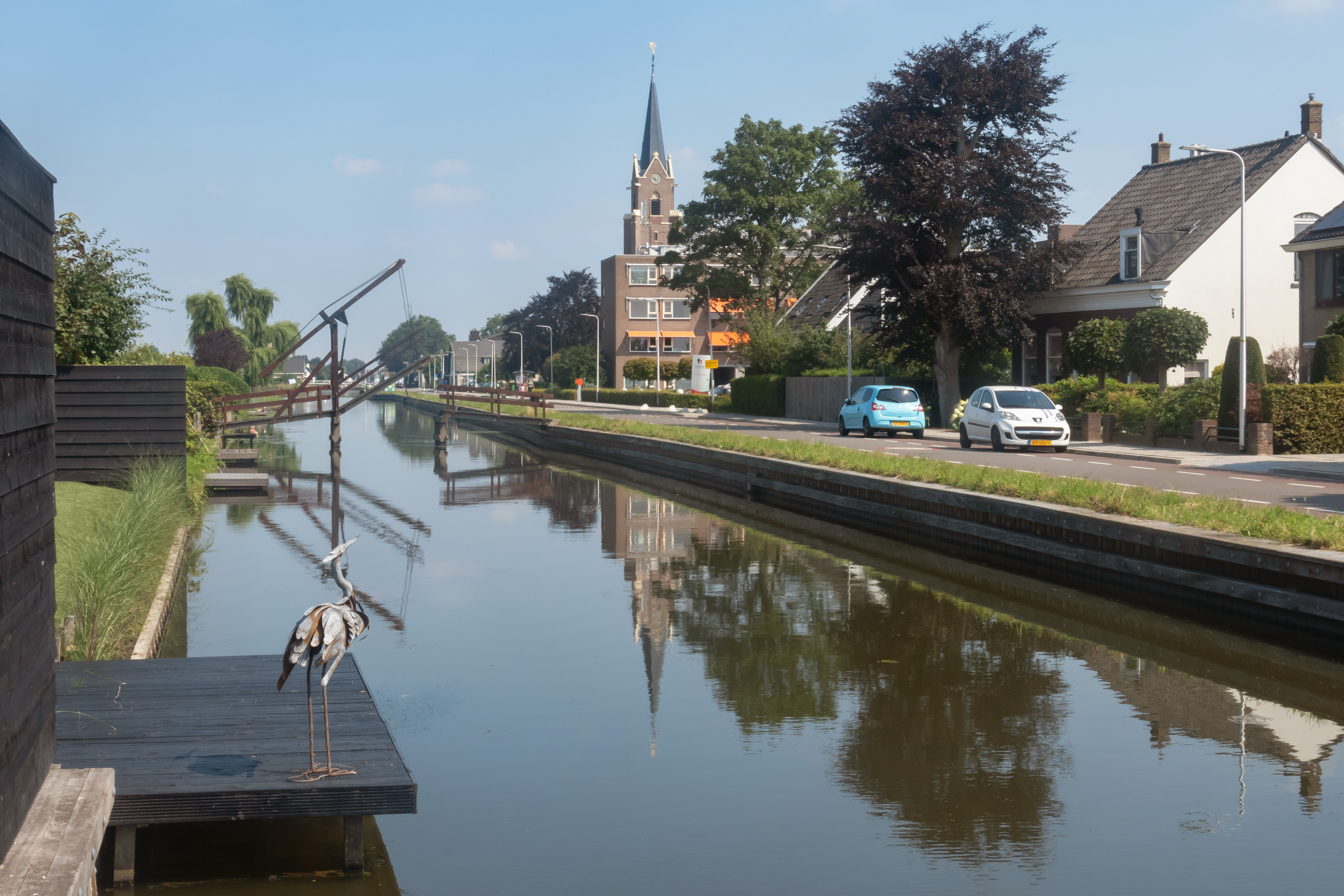
Canal along the Noordeindeseweg with church (Onze Lieve Vrouw Geboortekerk) in the background

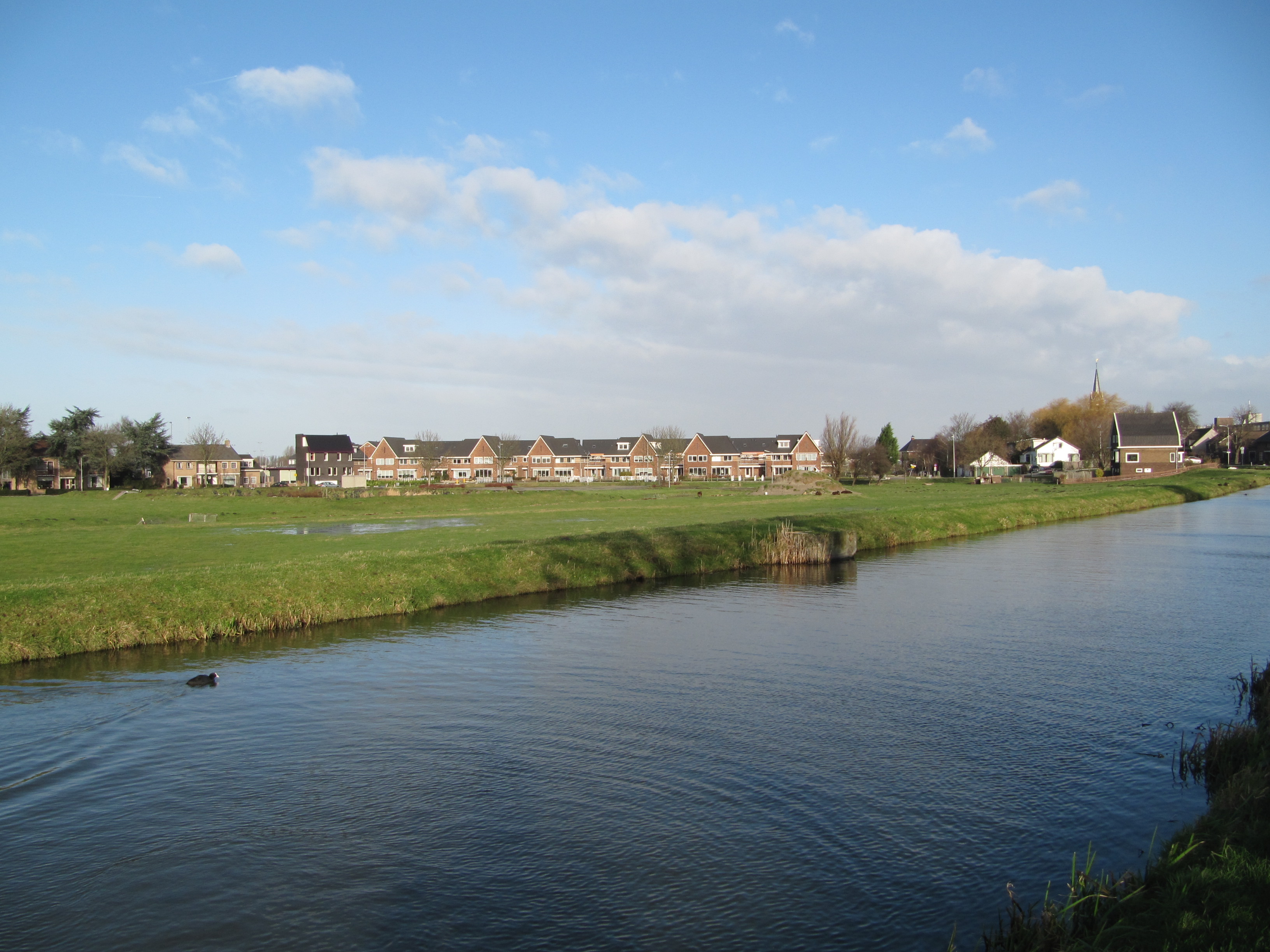
Noordeindseweg canal and polder

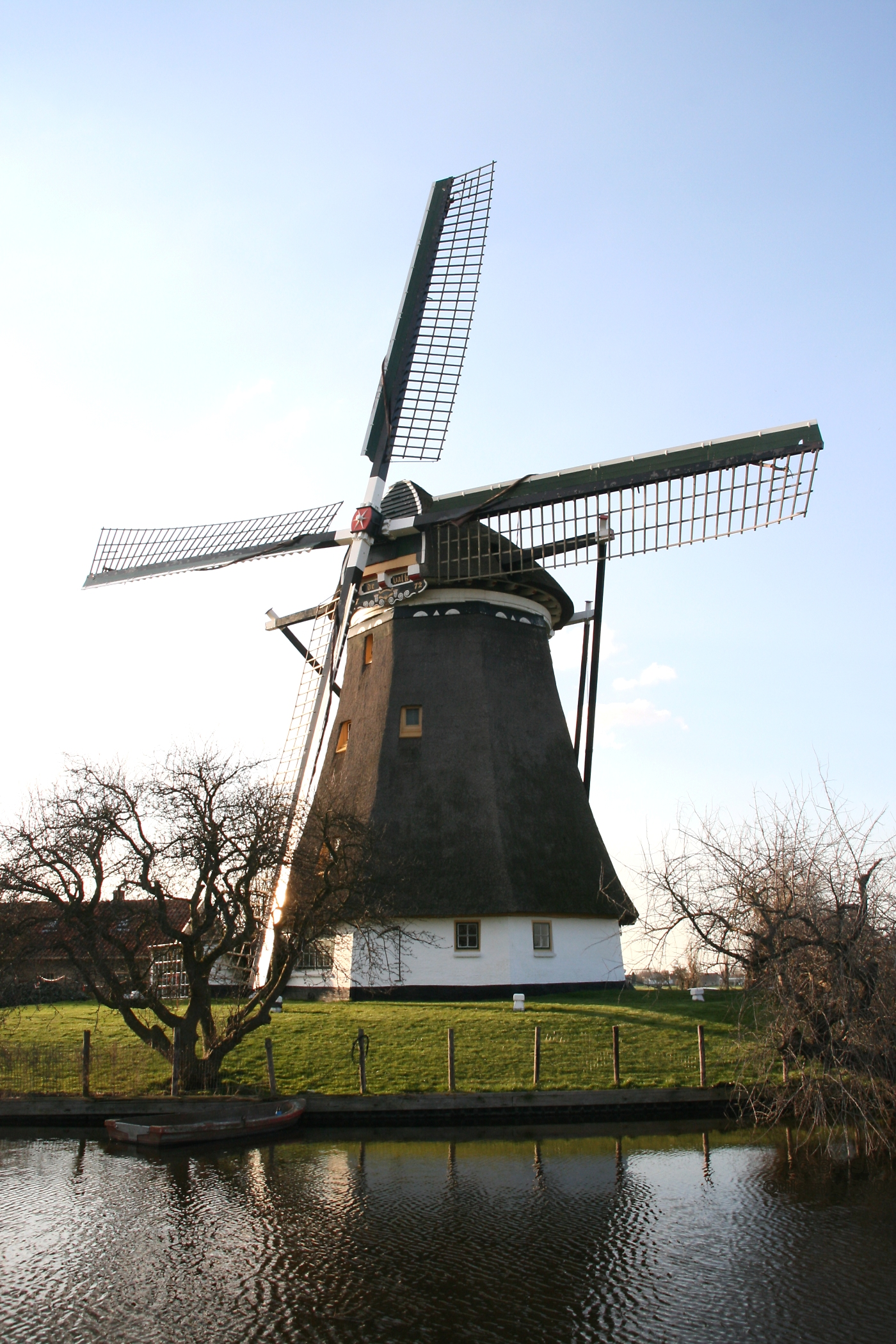
Windmill 'de Valk' (1772) located in township Rodenrijs, now used as a residential property

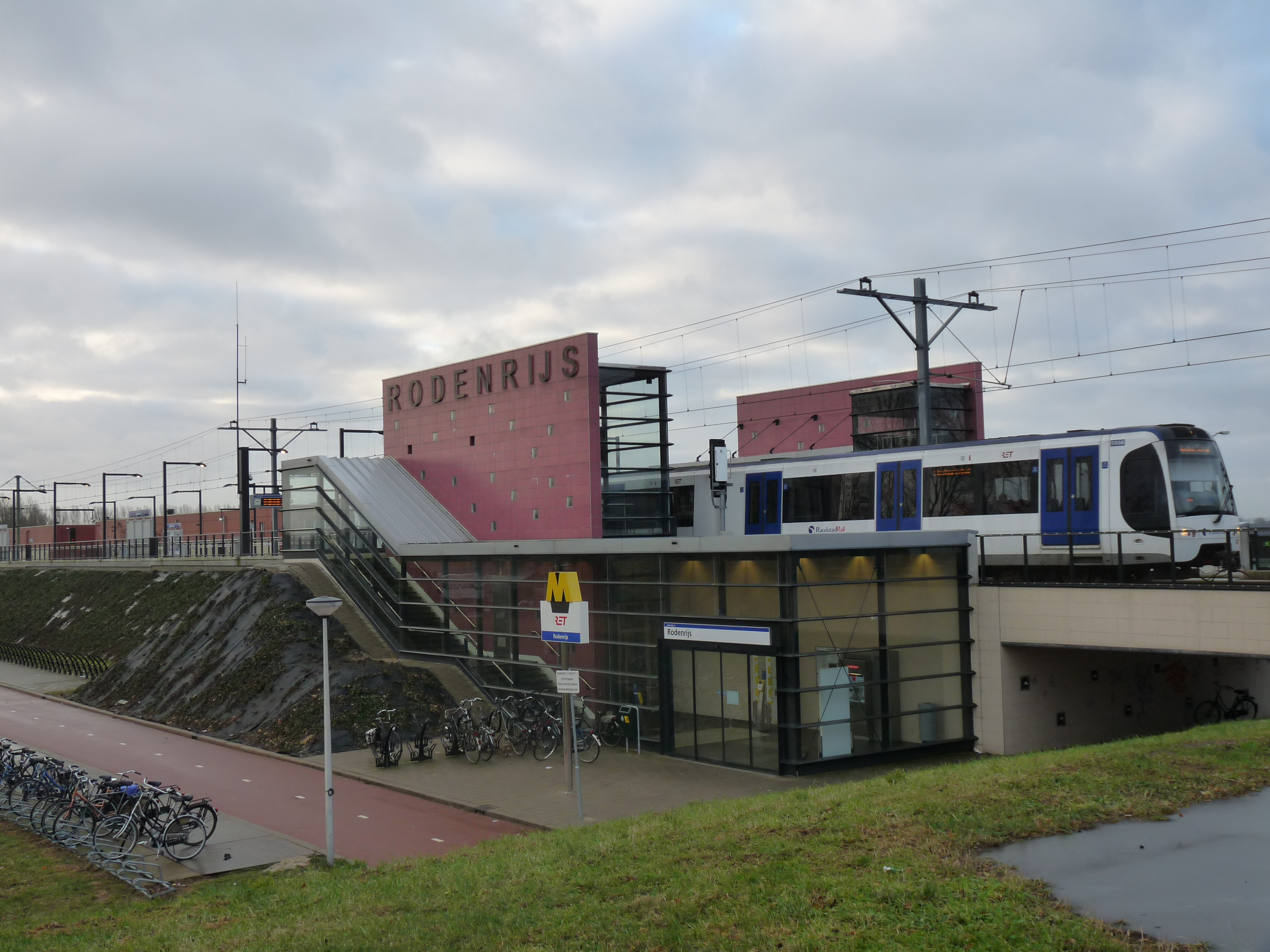
Metro Station Rodenrijs

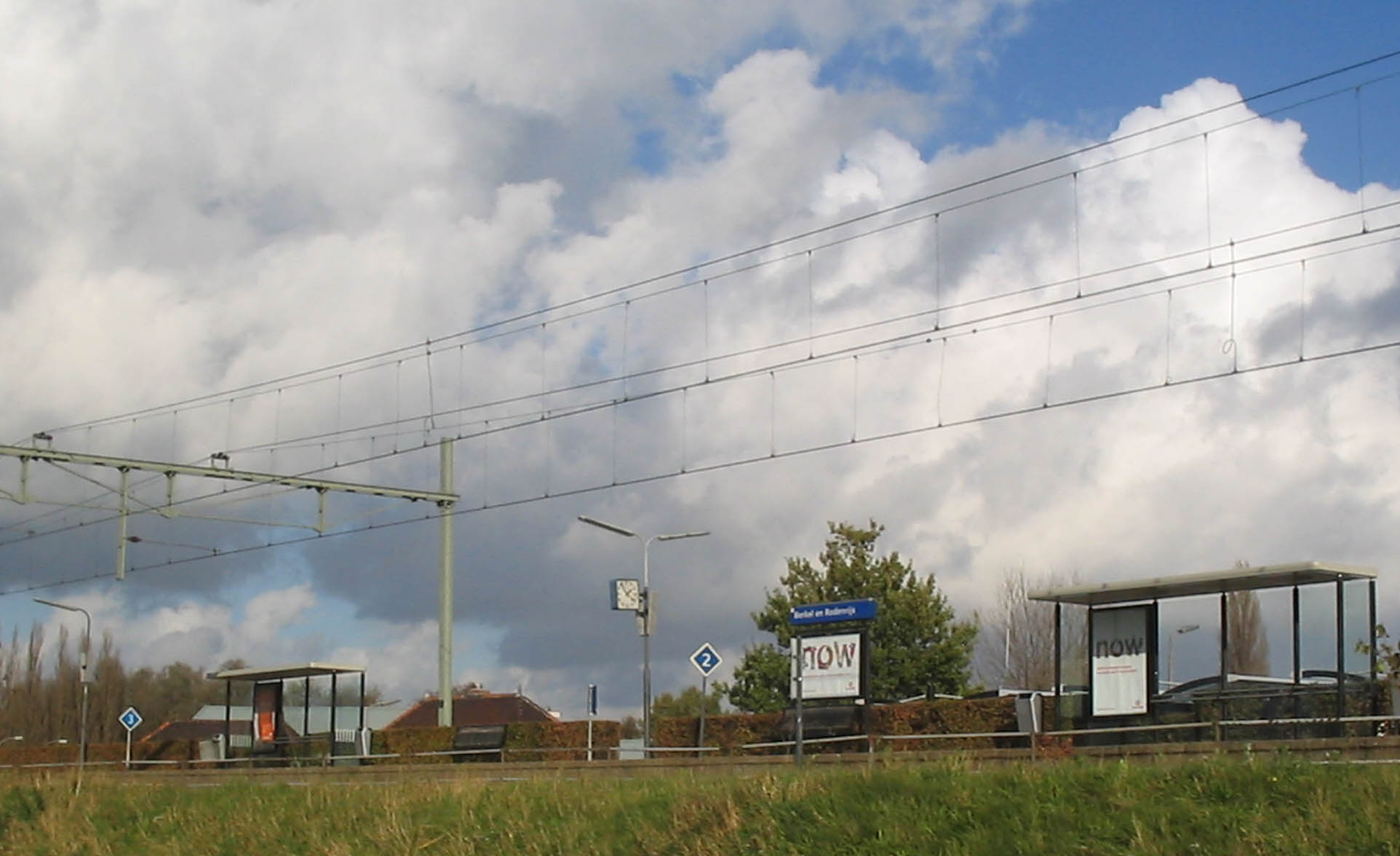
Railway Station Rodenrijs (2005), part of Rotterdam Hofplein - Den Haag HS line, closed in 2006
