= Lansingerland =

- Municipality
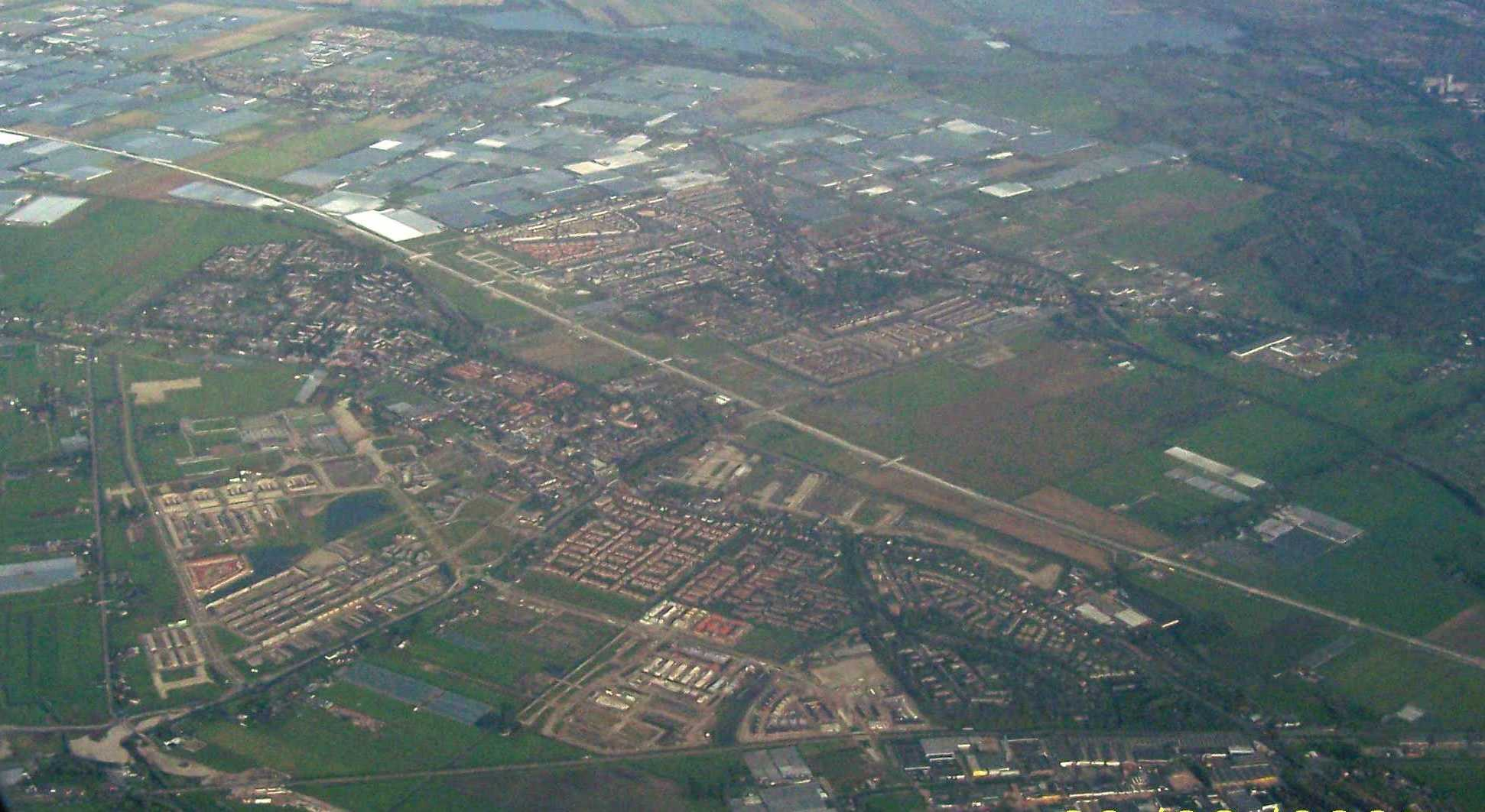
- Aerial view of Berkel en Rodenrijs

- Flag Coat of arms

- Location in South Holland
- Coordinates: 51°59′N 4°30′E
- Country: Netherlands
- Province: South Holland
- Established: 1 January 2007

Government
  - Body: Municipal council
  - Mayor: Rik van der Linden (CU)

Area
  - Total: 56.39 km^{2} (21.77 sq mi)
  - Land: 53.42 km^{2} (20.63 sq mi)
  - Water: 2.97 km^{2} (1.15 sq mi)
- Elevation: −5 m (−16 ft)

Population (January 2021)
  - Total: 63,363
  - Density: 1,186/km^{2} (3,070/sq mi)
- Time zone: UTC+1 (CET)
  - Summer (DST): UTC+2 (CEST)
- Postcode: 2650–2665
- Area code: 010
- Website: www.lansingerland.nl

Lansingerland (Dutch pronunciation: [ˈlɑnsɪŋərˌlɑnt]) is a municipality in the western Netherlands, in the province of South Holland. It was formed on 1 January 2007, by the merger of the municipalities of Berkel en Rodenrijs, Bleiswijk and Bergschenhoek, collectively known as the "B-Triangle". The former municipality of Tempel, abolished in 1855, is also part of Lansingerland.

The name was chosen from a competition and derived from the name Lansingh, the height-of-land between the Delfland and Schieland Water Boards, which runs between the "3B-Triangle" villages. The choice of name is symbolic: the name of the border that formerly divided the area, now unites it. The "h" in Lansingh was dropped to ease spelling.

Lansingerland consists of the following communities:

- Bergschenhoek
- Berkel en Rodenrijs
- Bleiswijk
- Tempel (deserted)
- De Rotte
- Kruisweg

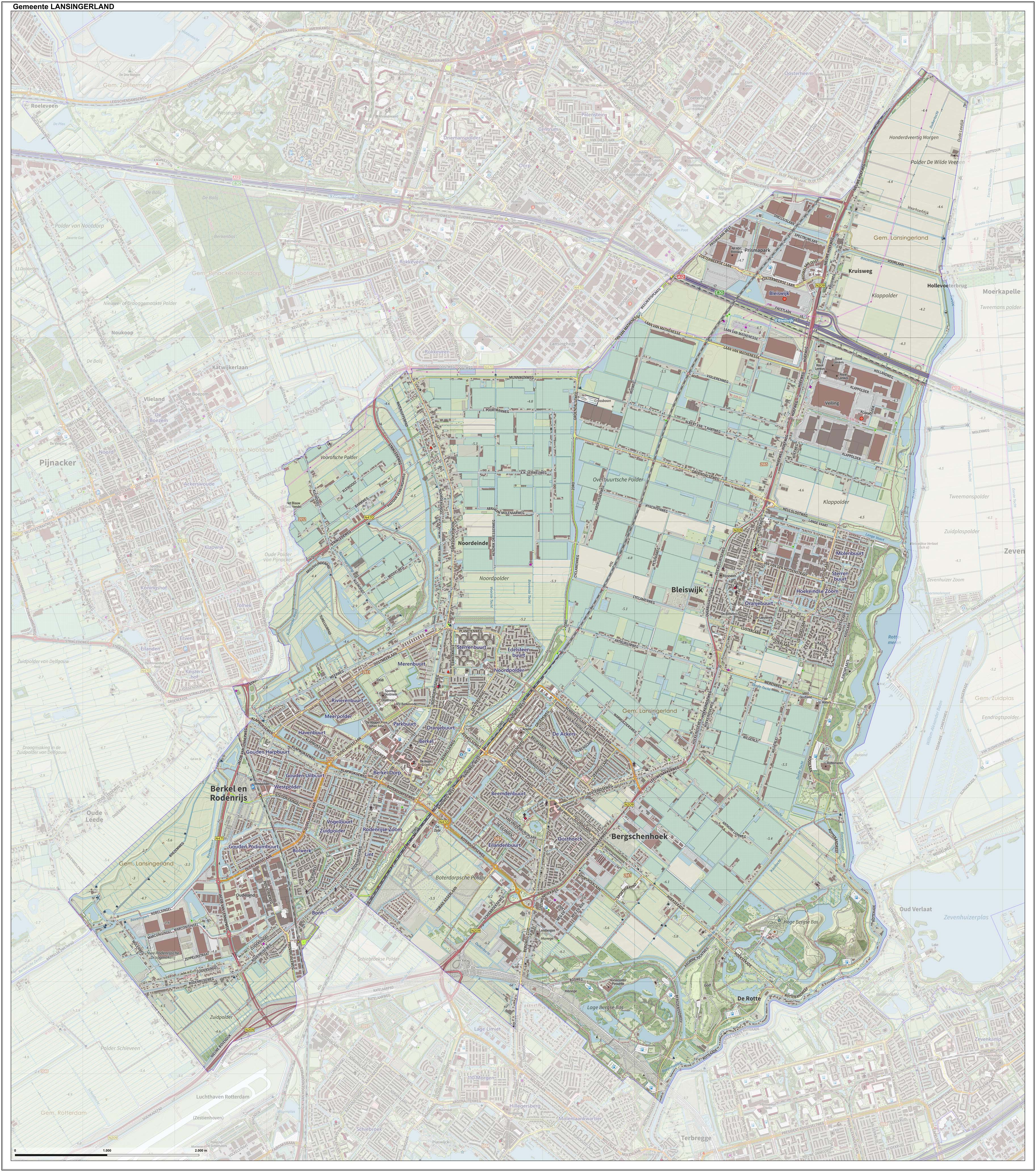
Map of the municipality of Lansingerland, June 2015

== Politics ==
On 18 September 2007 Ewald van Vliet was installed as the first mayor of Lansingerland.

Mayors
Year	Mayor
2025	Rik van der Linden
2025	Jules Bijl
2015	Pieter van de Stadt
2014	Coos Rijsdijk
2007	Ewald van Vliet

The municipal council of Lansingerland has 33 seats. The council, which sits for four-year cycles, was re-elected in 2026.

Council seats
Party	2014	2018	2022	2026
Livable 3B	7	9	7	12
CDA	6	5	6	7
VVD	5	7	5	4
WIJ Lansingerland	2	3	7	4
D66	4	3	3	3
GroenLinks / PvdA	-	-	-	2
PvdA	2	1	1	*
GroenLinks	1	2	1	*
ChristianUnion	3	3	3	1
Neeleman Party	1	-	-	-
Total	31	33	33	33

* GroenLinks and PvdA presented a joint list in 2026.

== Notable people ==
- Maria van Utrecht (ca.1551 in Rodenrijs - 1629) a notable figure in the Dutch Revolt
- Piet Rietveld (1952 in Berkel en Rodenrijs – 2013) a Dutch economist and Professor in Transport Economics
- Wilco Zeelenberg (born 1966 in Bleiswijk) a Dutch former professional Grand Prix motorcycle road racer
- Joost Luiten (born 1986 in Bleiswijk) a Dutch professional golfer who plays on the European Tour
