= Bleiswijk =

- Village
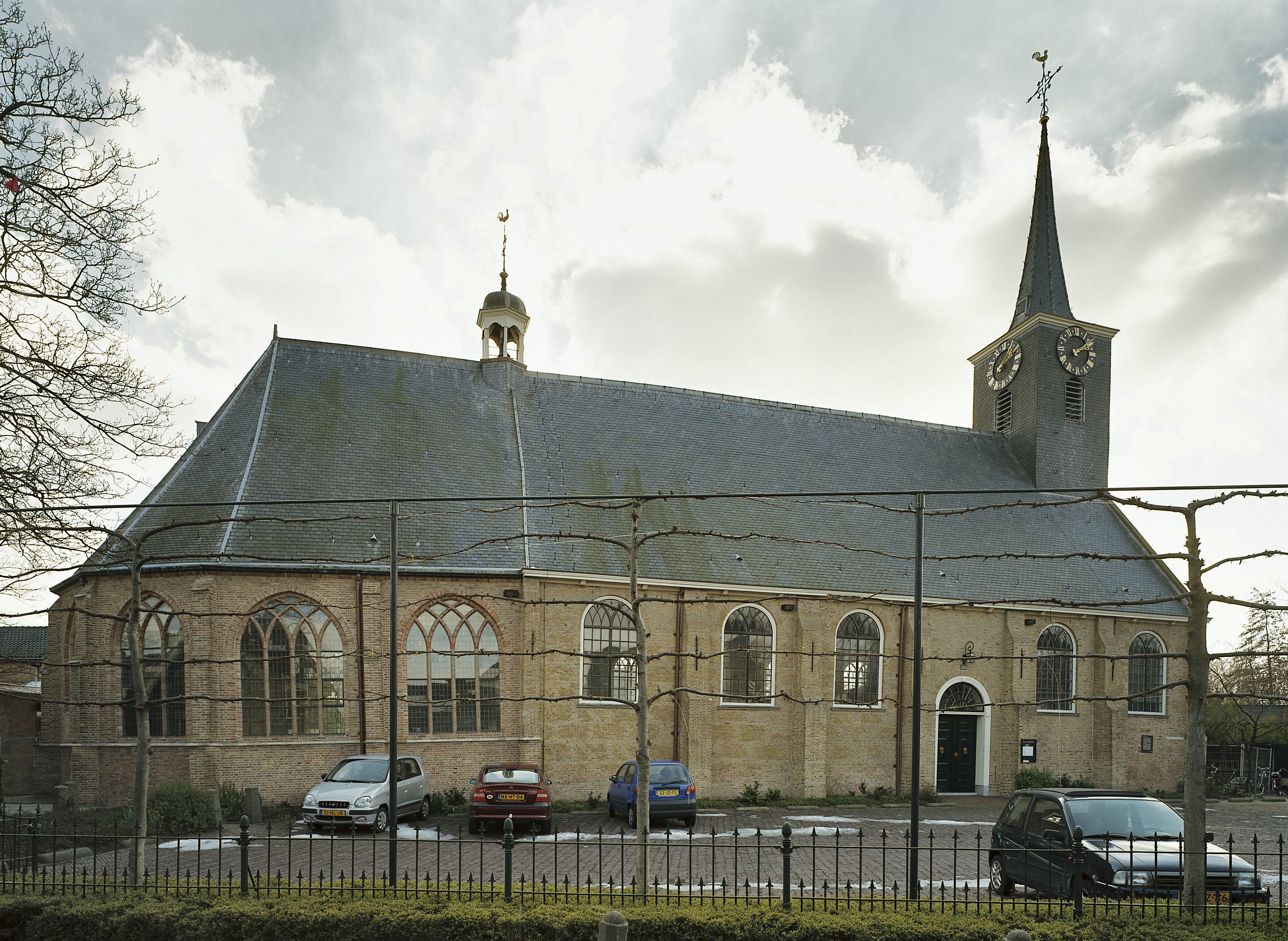
- Nederlands Hervormde Kerk

- Flag Seal

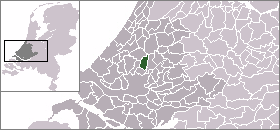
- Location in South Holland

- Location within the Netherlands
- Country: Netherlands
- Province: South Holland
- Municipality: Lansingerland

Area
  - Total: 21.96 km^{2} (8.48 sq mi)
  - Land: 21.13 km^{2} (8.16 sq mi)
  - Water: 0.84 km^{2} (0.32 sq mi)

Population (January 2020)
  - Total: 10,895
  - Density: 515.6/km^{2} (1,335/sq mi)
- Time zone: UTC+1 (CET)
  - Summer (DST): UTC+2 (CEST)
- Postal code: 2665
- Area code: 010
- Major roads: N209

Bleiswijk (Dutch: [ˈblɛisʋɛik]) is a town and former municipality in the western Netherlands, in the province of South Holland.

== Demographics ==
The municipality had a population of 10,222 in 2006, and covered an area of 21.96 km^{2} (8.48 sq mi) of which 0.83 km^{2} (0.32 sq mi) is water. On 1 January 2007, the town was merged with neighbouring towns Bergschenhoek and Berkel en Rodenrijs to form the new municipality Lansingerland.

According to the January 2020 census, its population was 10,895.
