= Bergschenhoek =

- Village
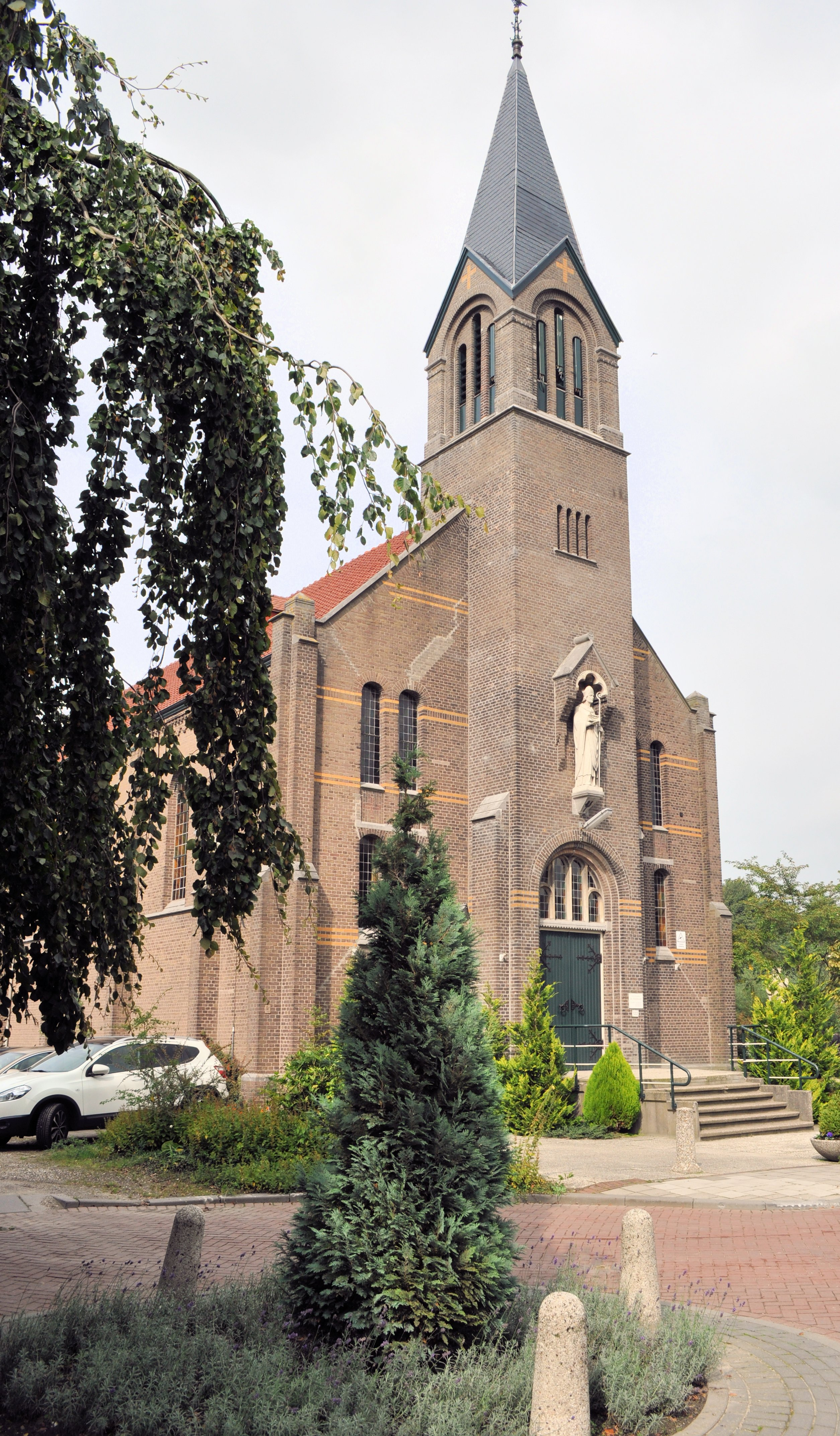
- Sint Willibrorduskerk

- Flag Seal

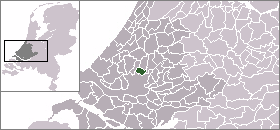
- Location of Bergschenhoek in South Holland

- Location within the Netherlands
- Country: Netherlands
- Province: South Holland
- Municipality: Lansingerland

Area
  - Total: 15.52 km^{2} (5.99 sq mi)
  - Land: 14.89 km^{2} (5.75 sq mi)
  - Water: 0.63 km^{2} (0.24 sq mi)

Population (January 2020)
  - Total: 18,750
  - Density: 1,259/km^{2} (3,261/sq mi)
- Time zone: UTC+1 (CET)
  - Summer (DST): UTC+2 (CEST)
- Postal code: 2661
- Area code: 010
- Major roads: N209

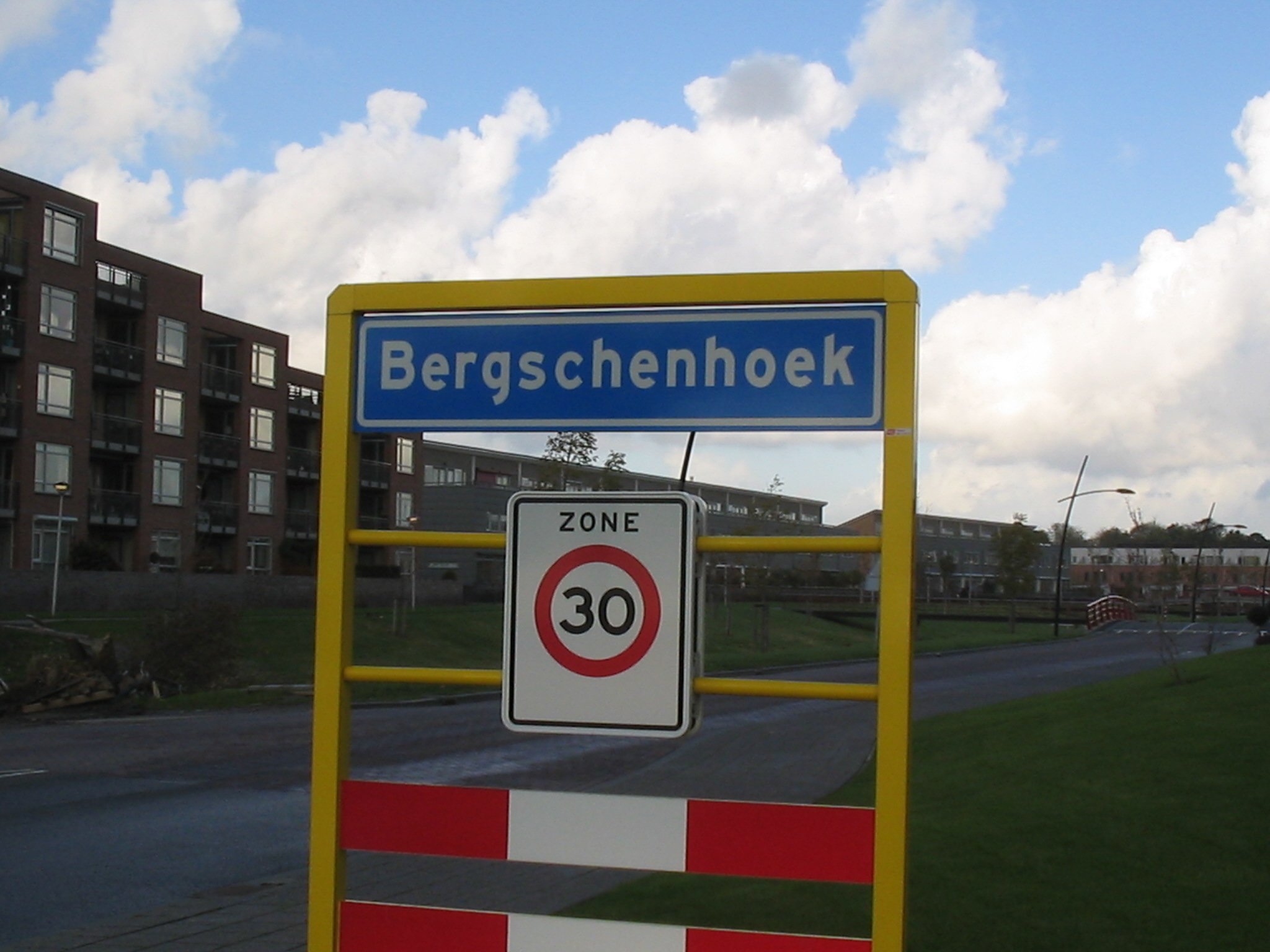
Town sign

Bergschenhoek (Dutch pronunciation: [ˌbɛr(ə)xsə(n)ˈɦuk]) is a town and former municipality in the municipality of Lansingerland, in the province of South Holland, Netherlands. It is situated roughly 10 km to the north of Rotterdam. The town had a population of 18,475 in 2019, and covered an area of 15.52 km^{2} (5.99 sq mi) of which 0.63 km^{2} (0.24 sq mi) is water. On 1 January 2007, the town was merged with neighbouring towns Berkel en Rodenrijs and Bleiswijk to form the new municipality Lansingerland; these three towns collectively are known locally as the "3B Hoek".

Due to the continuing influx of people to Bergschenhoek, it is in a constant state of expansion and is now predominantly a commuter town as most of its residents work in the neighbouring cities, such as The Hague and Rotterdam. The town had a large population increase since 1990, because of the Vinex-plans. The town grew from 7,600 inhabitants in 1990 to nearly 18,500 in 2019.

The name of the town is derived from a district of the nearby city of Rotterdam, Hillegersberg. There was a road leading to this municipality. On a corner of this road ('hoek' in Dutch) a settlement grew, leading to a village. This village was named after Hillegersberg, and the corner was incorporated in the name, hence the name (Hillegers)Bergschenhoek.
