= Hillegersberg (disambiguation) =

== Places ==
- Hillegersberg is a neighbourhood in Northern Rotterdam
- Hillegersberg-Schiebroek is a borough in northern Rotterdam.

== People ==
- Jos van Hillegersberg (born 1968), Dutch computer scientist
