= Plaswijckpark =

Amusement and recreational park in Rotterdam, Netherlands

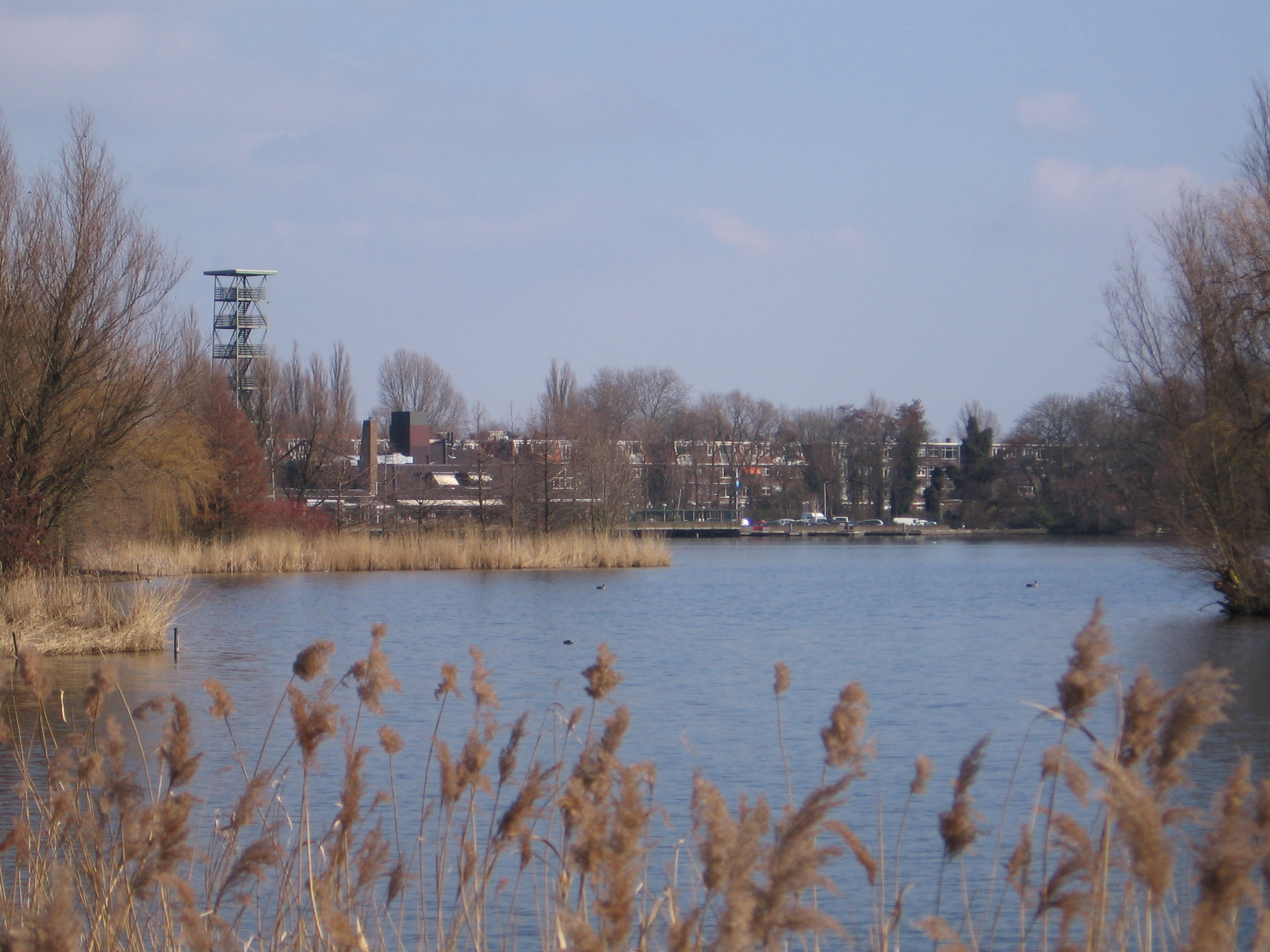
- The Bergse Plassen and the observation tower
- Interactive map of Plaswijckpark
- Location: Rotterdam, Netherlands
- Coordinates: 51°57′22″N 4°28′53″E
- Status: Operating
- Opened: 1923
- Owner: Stichting Plaswijckpark
- Operating season: Year-round
- Attendance: 440,000 (2017)
- Area: 15 ha (37 acres)

Plaswijckpark is a recreational and amusement park located on the shores of the Bergse Achterplas founded in 1923 between the districts of Hillegersberg and Schiebroek on the northern edge of Rotterdam, Netherlands. The park is owned by the Stichting Plaswijckpark. It is known as a small-scale amusement park primarily aimed at families with young children and school groups.

== History ==
=== Origins ===
The park was founded in 1923 by Rotterdam hospitality entrepreneur C.N.A. Loos, best known for operating the grand café at the former Station Hofplein. Originally opened as Paviljoen Plaswijck, it consisted of landscaped gardens and walking paths together with a small zoo featuring animals including monkeys and wallabies. The park proved popular, and was later expanded with a rose garden, a playground, an observation tower, and a sightseeing boat operating on the adjacent lake. Rowboats were also available for hire. For decades, the park was one of the few green recreational spaces available to residents of the Oude Noorden district of Rotterdam.

By 1975, Plaswijckpark faced possible closure as visitor numbers declined and admission revenue became insufficient to sustain operations. Closure was avoided after the Municipality of Rotterdam granted the park a structural annual subsidy. Since 2003, the park has held a zoo licence. Municipal operating support ended in 2013, although the city awarded an investment grant that year to finance the construction of an indoor playground for use during bad weather.

In 2021, a set of 357 solar panels were installed at the park, with the first set being installed in July, and the second in August. The majority of the panels are located near the park's service center, with others in two different locations.

=== Avian influenza ===
In November 2016, the H5N8 strain of avian influenza was detected in several waterfowl at Plaswijckpark. The affected birds were culled and the animal section of the park was temporarily closed to visitors.

=== 2021 fire ===
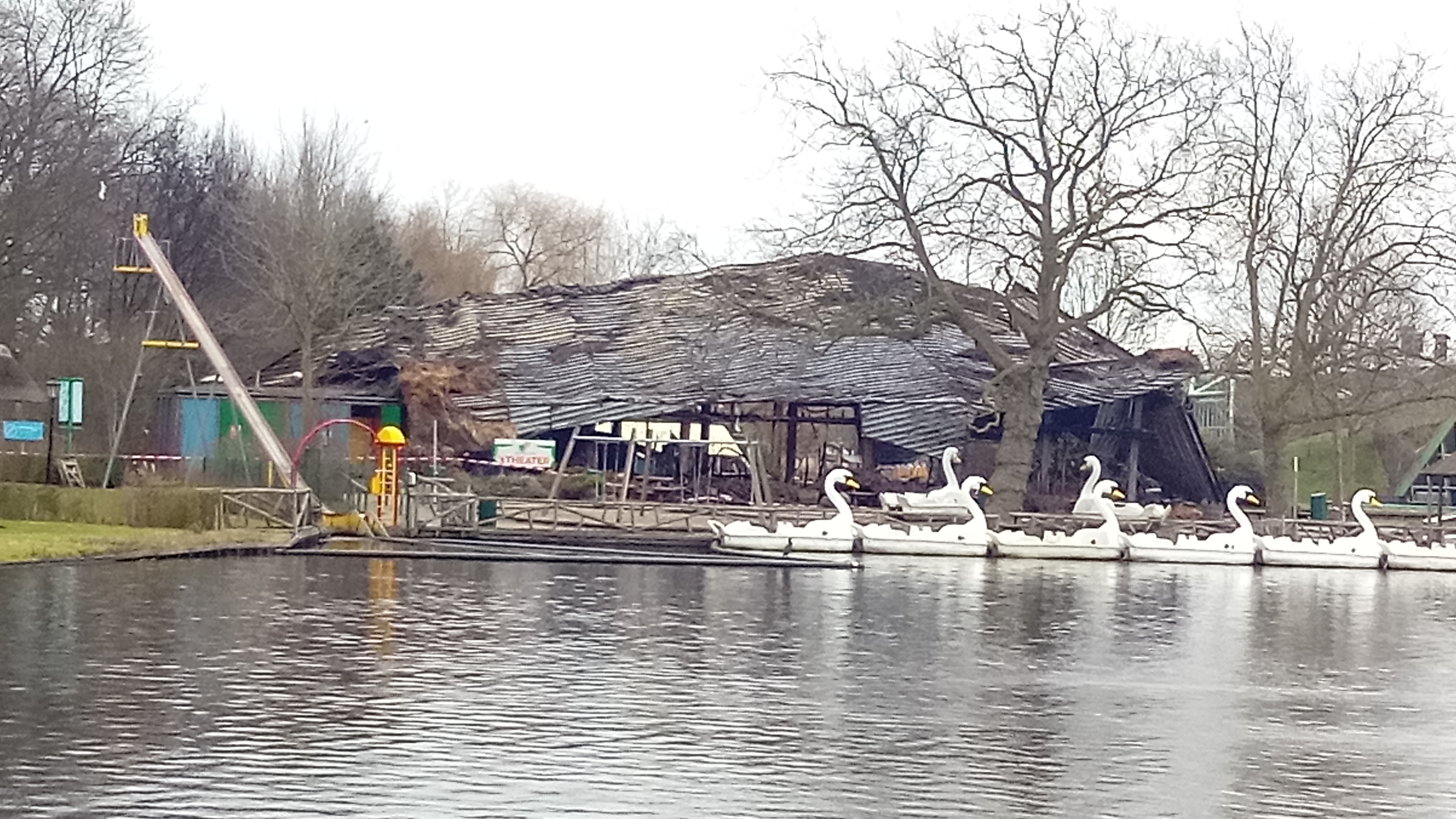
The destroyed theatre building.

On 27 January 2021, a major fire broke out at the park. The theatre building, which had a thatched roof, was completely destroyed. Authorities investigated the possibility of arson after a video circulated on Snapchat appeared to suggest that the fire had been deliberately started.

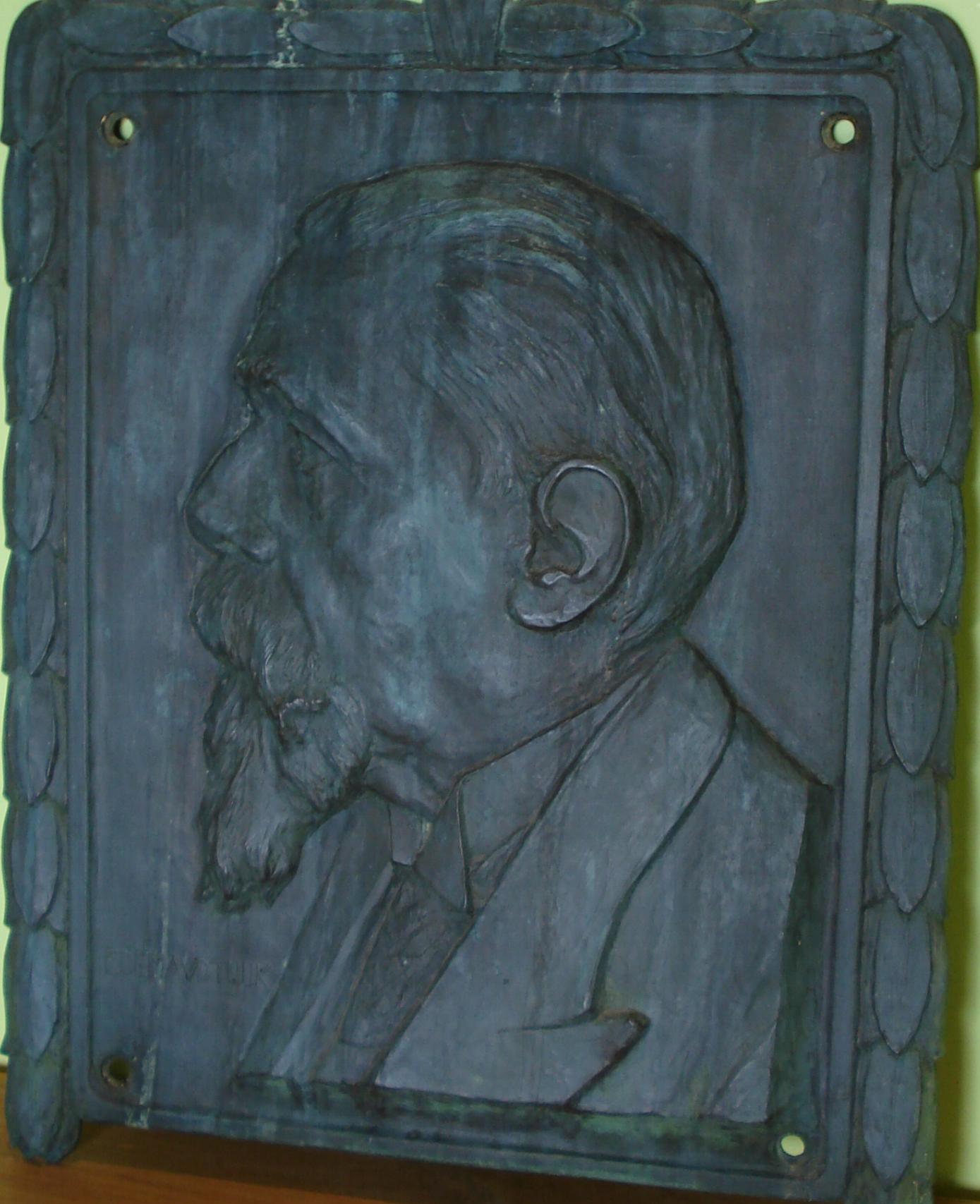
Founder C.N.A. Loos

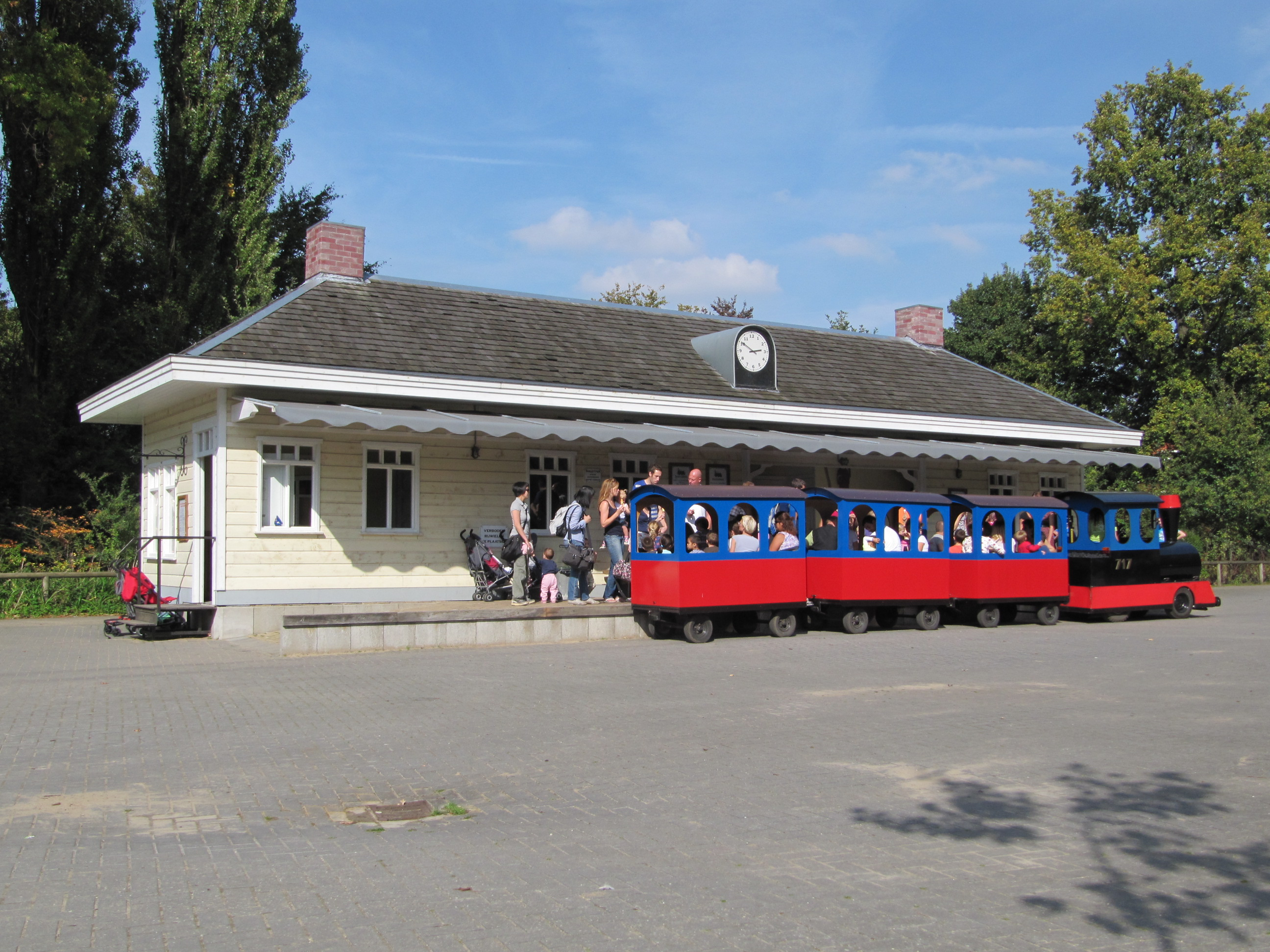
The park's "station"

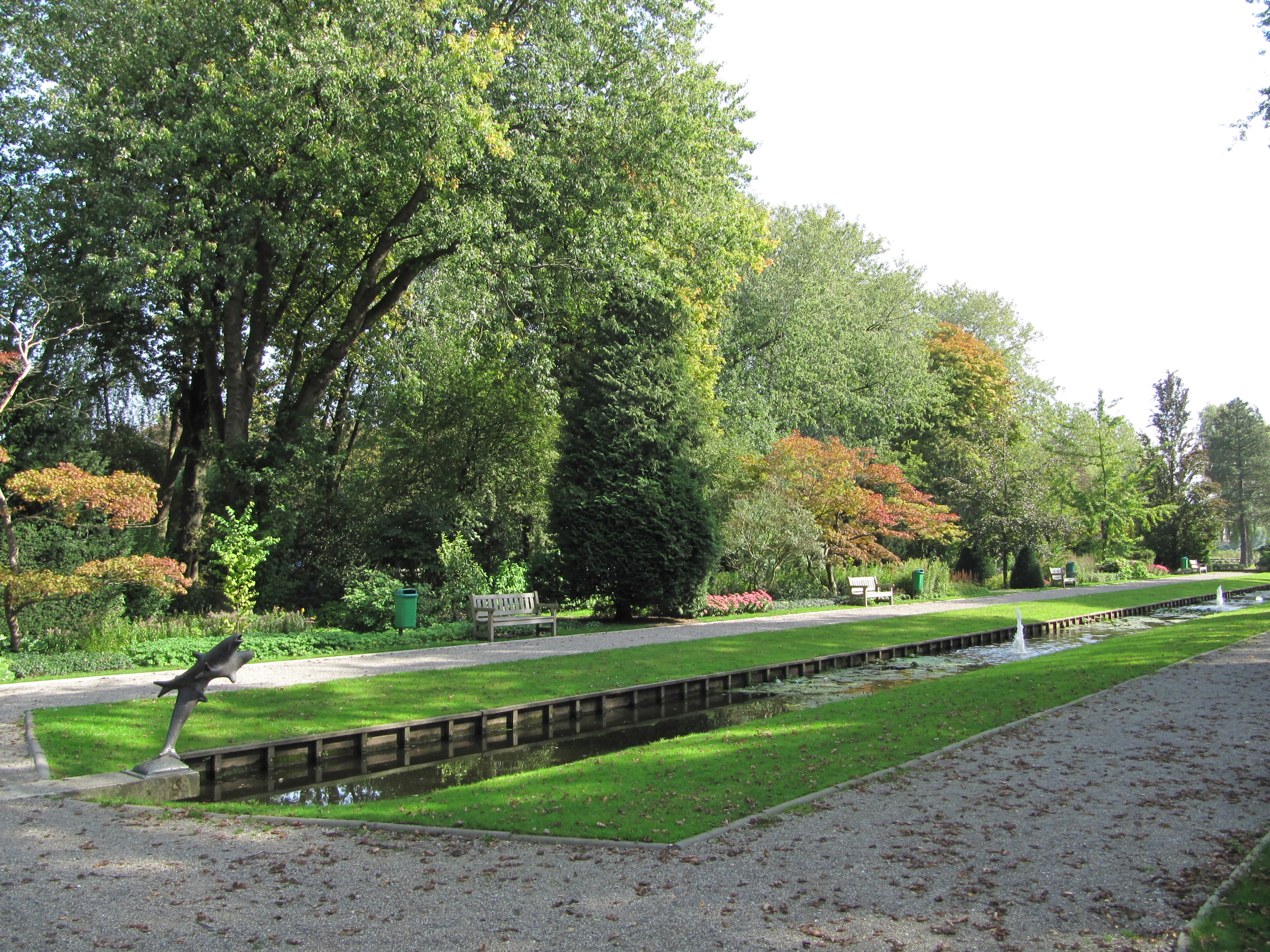
Walking park
