= Kleiwegkwartier =

Neighbourhood in Rotterdam

- Neighborhood of Rotterdam
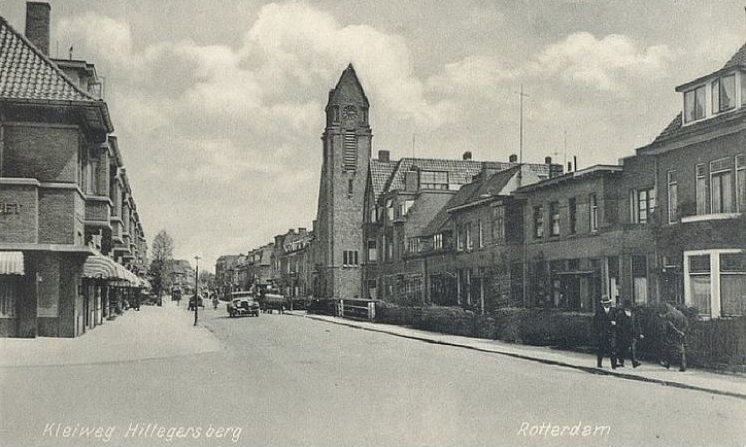
- Rotterdam's Kleiweg in 1931

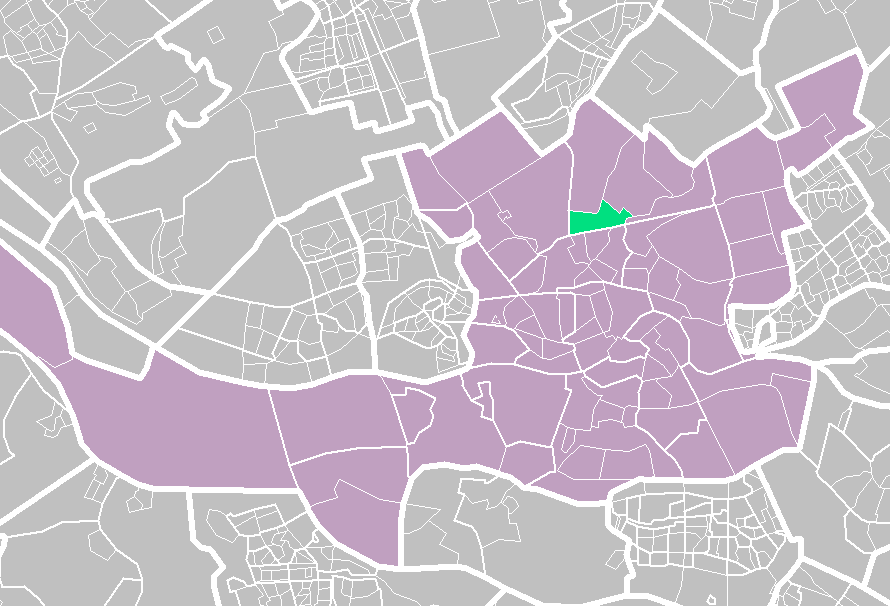
- Location of the Kleiwegkwartier in Rotterdam
- Coordinates: 51°56′44″N 4°28′58″E
- Country: Netherlands
- Province: South Holland
- COROP: Rotterdam
- Borough: Hillegersberg-Schiebroek

Area
  - Total: 127 ha (310 acres)
- Time zone: UTC+1 (CET)
- Postcode: 3045, 3051
- Area code: 010
- Website: http://www.bokrotterdam.nl/

Kleiwegkwartier is a neighbourhood quarter in Rotterdam, Netherlands. It is in the southern part of Hillegersberg with origins dating from the early 1600s.

== Background ==
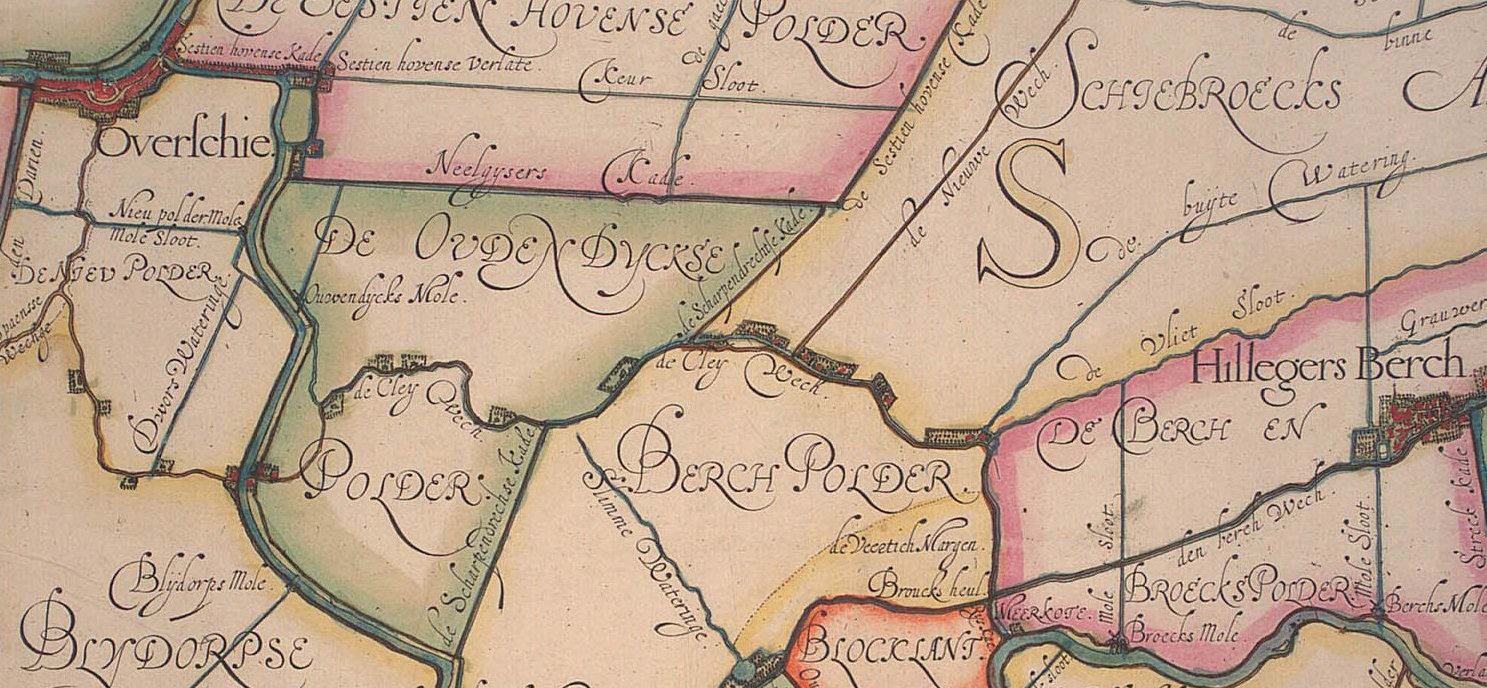
The Cley Wech (Kleiweg) as seen on a map from 1611 running from Hillegersberg to Overschie .

The Kleiwegkwartier is located just north of the A20 autoroute and is part of Rotterdam's Hillegersberg-Schiebroek district. The district originally belonged to the municipalities of Hillegersberg and Schiebroek until they were annexed by Rotterdam in 1941. The area now makes part of Rotterdam's Hillegersberg-Zuid district.

The area owes its name to the Kleiweg, the main road that runs centrally through its neighbourhood. The Kleiweg originally served as the main connection between Rotterdam and Overschie where it crossed old creek bridges over the rivers Schie and Rotte. The early existence of the road is documented on an area map dated 1611.

Over time the road became increasingly lined by farms, houses and businesses—especially with major residential development occurring in the Kleiwegkwartier during the 1930s. The area's railway station (1908) and the lake Bergse Achterplas had been established by that time.

== Character ==
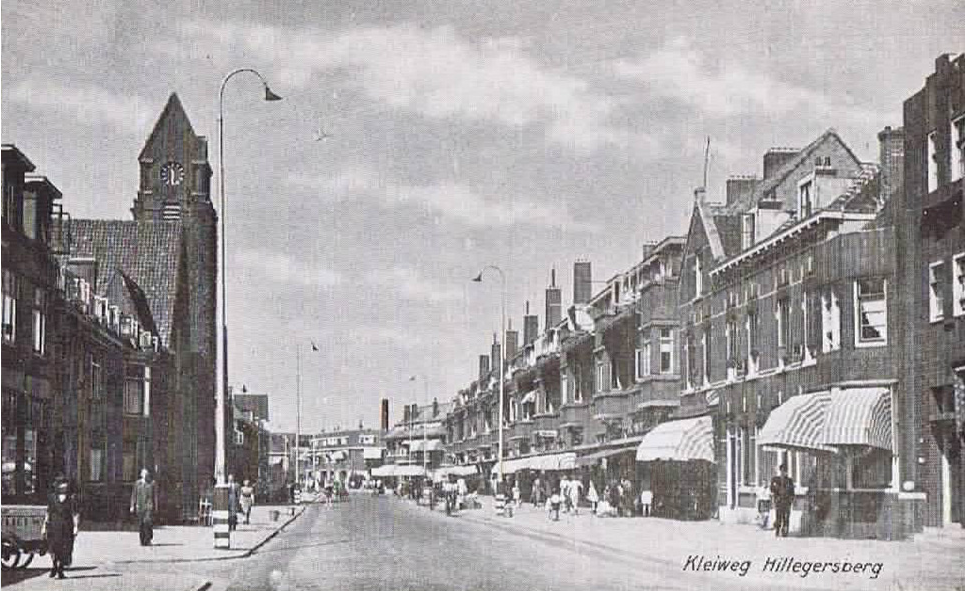
The Kleiweg as seen 1923

The Kleiwegkwartier is a mixed-use neighbourhood which lies close to the centre of Rotterdam. It "mostly escaped wartime bombing, leaving its residential streets intact." Many of its streets are now lined with trees.

The houses north of the Kleiweg, also close to the Bergse Plassen, tend to be larger and more luxurious than the houses on its southern side. Light industry, warehouses and tram depots are located in the southern part of the neighbourhood. Its most western section, near the Overschiese Kleiweg, still retains characteristics of the area's rural origins.

The hospital Franciscus Gasthuis is located on the south-western edge of Kleiwegkwartier.

The neighbourhood benefits from good communication links with Rotterdam International airport, two railways stations, a tram and bus line and the A20 autoroute in close proximity.

The shops on the Kleiweg make part of one of the Hillegersberg area's three shopping centres.

== Gallery ==
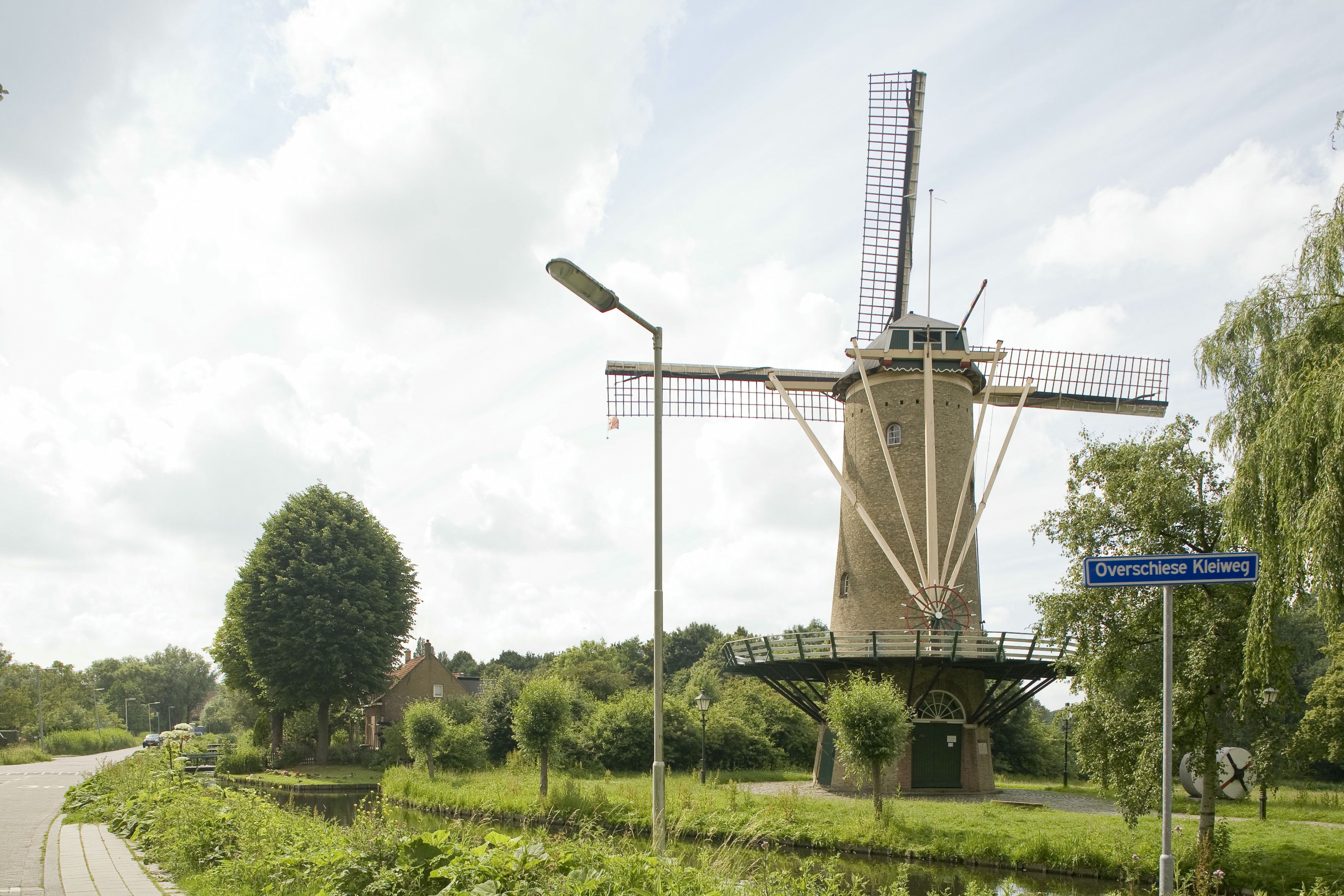
Image of the Overschiese Kleiweg (2007)

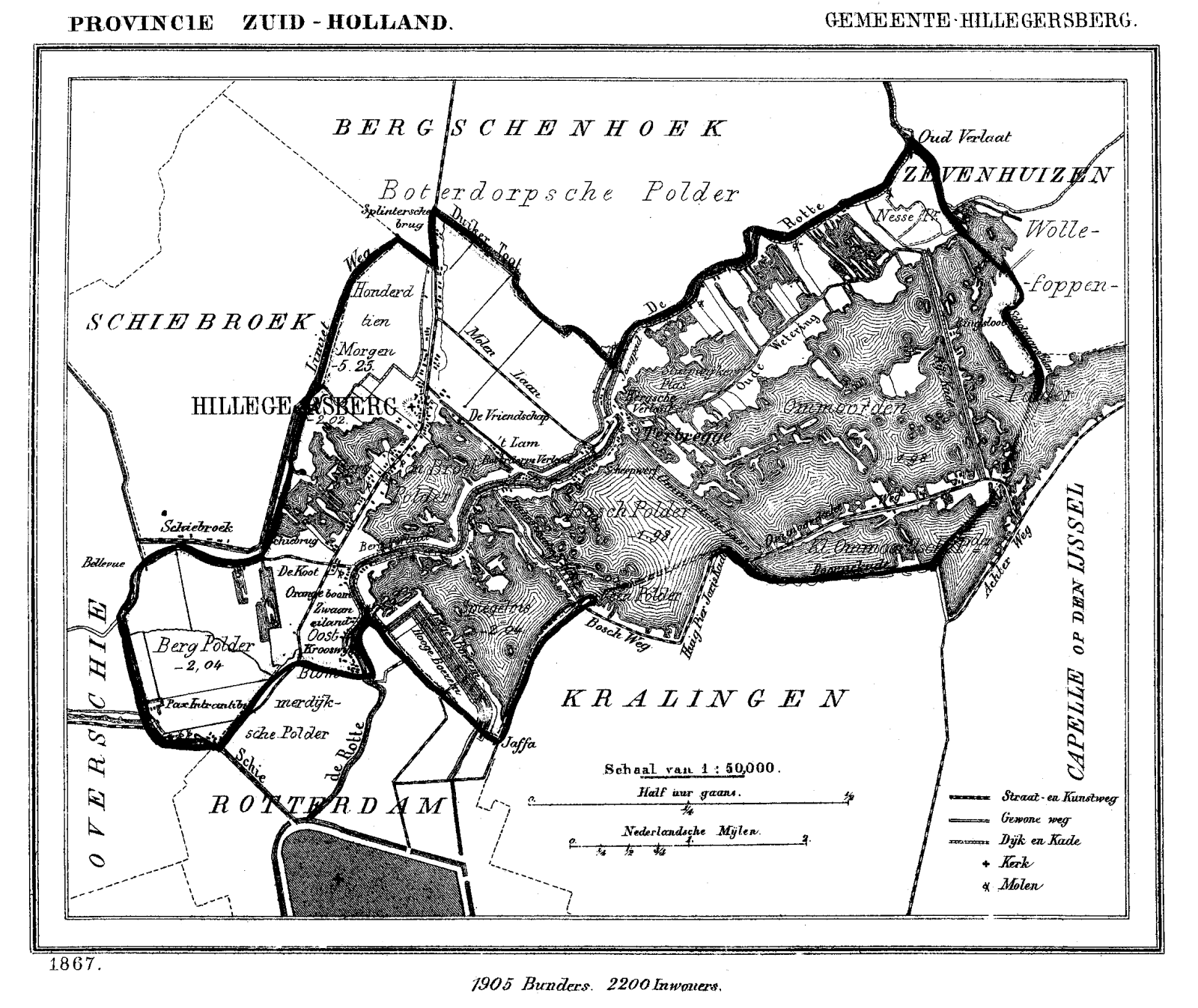
Map of Hillegersberg in 1867, prior to the development of the Kleiwegkwartier

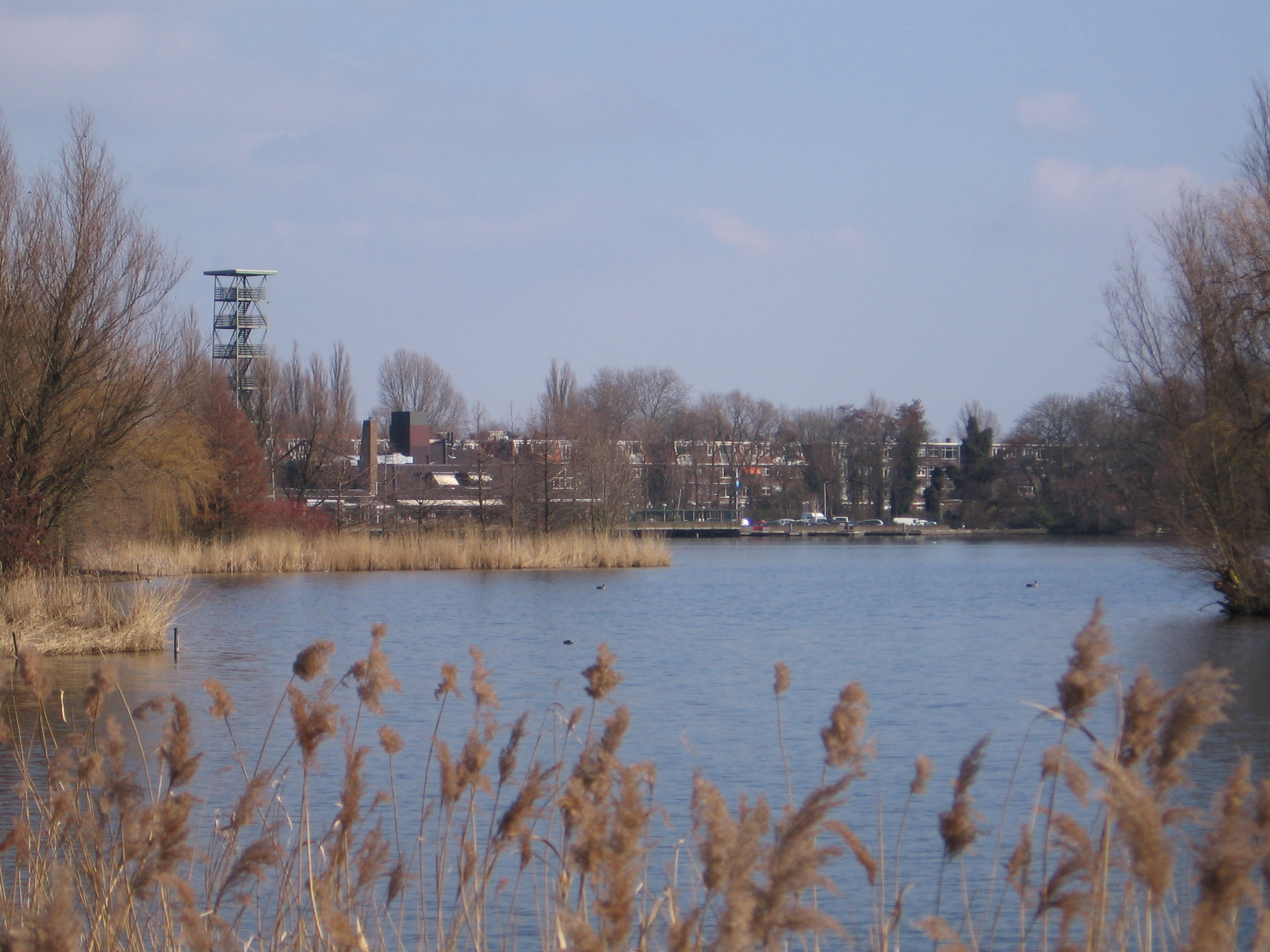
View on the Bergse Achterplas from the Kleiwegkwartier (2006)

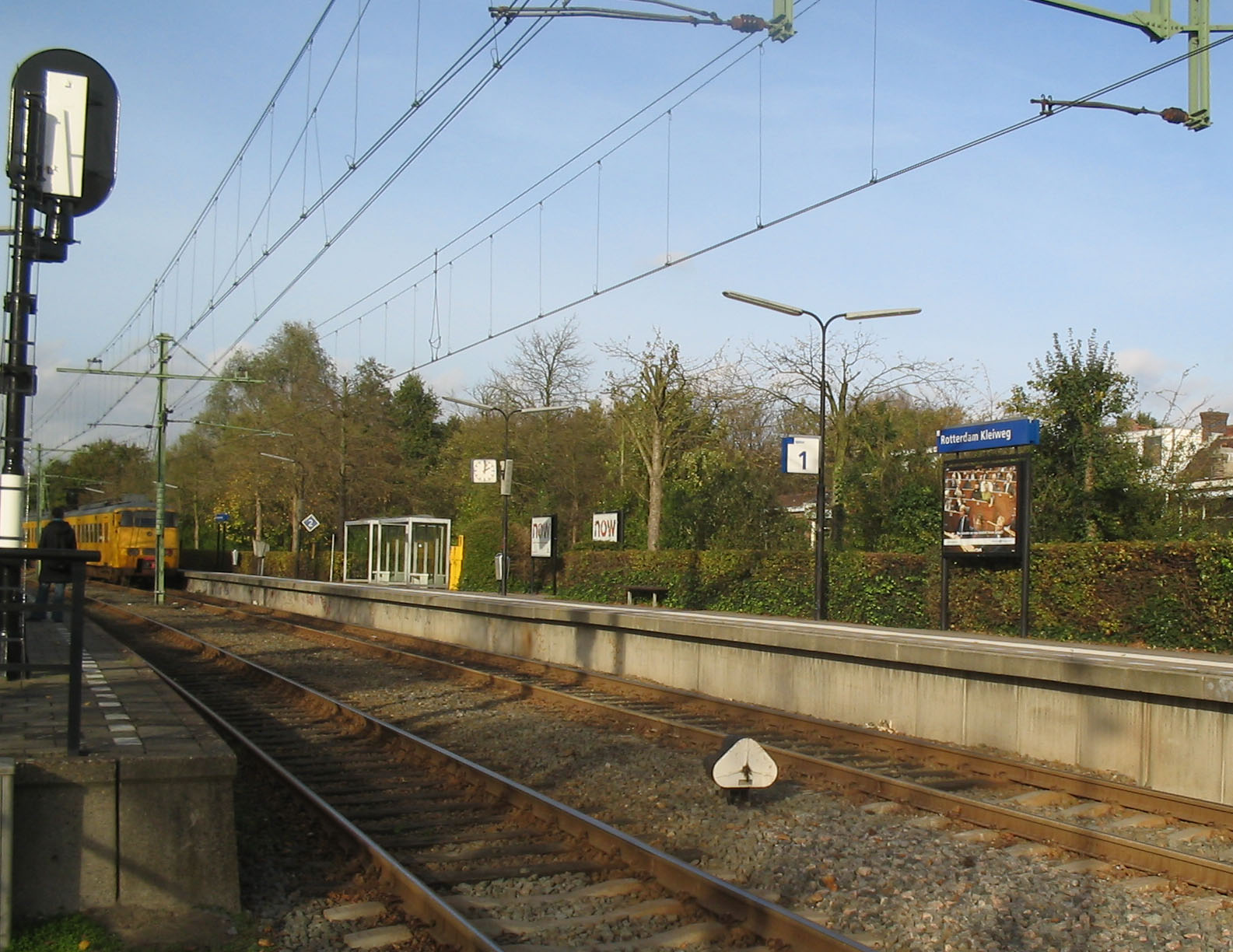
The Kleiweg Station in 2005 (now closed)
