= 110-Morgen =

- Neighborhood
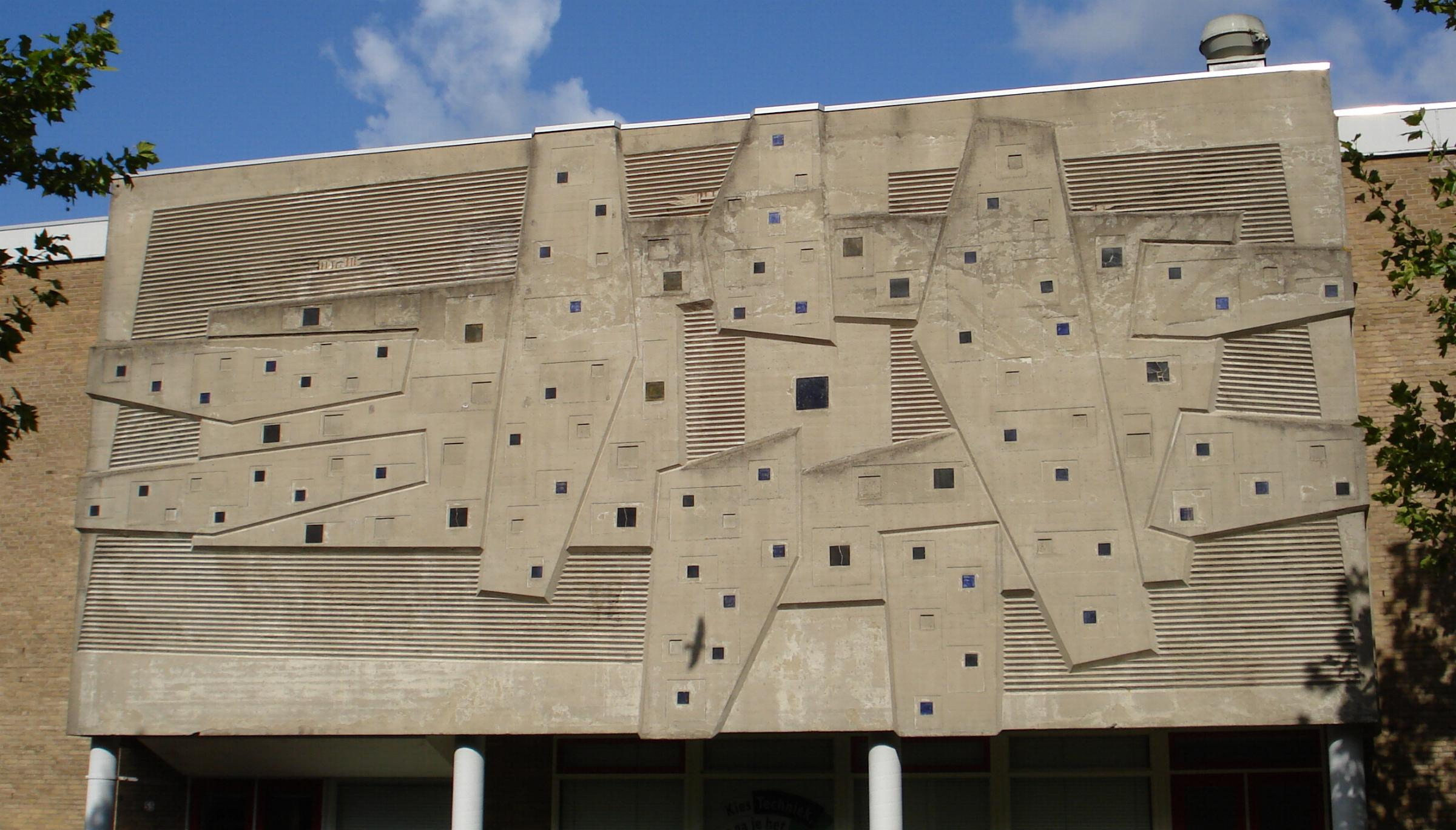
- Rotterdam kunstwerk argonautenweg Roode.
- Interactive map of 110-Morgen
- Coordinates: 51.963938°N 4.489461°E
- Country: Netherlands
- Province: South Holland
- COROP: Rotterdam
- Borough: Hillegersberg-Schiebroek

Area
  - Total: 1.30 sq mi (3.37 km^{2})
- Time zone: UTC+1 (CET)

110-Morgen is a neighborhood in Rotterdam, Netherlands Located in Hillegersberg-Schiebroek. The name refers to a polder of the same name from 1772, with a surface area of 110 morgen.

The first plans for residential development of the area were presented in 1933. The neighborhood was established after World War II as part of the efforts to rebuild Rotterdam. It was renovated around the year 2000. 110-Morgen has a residents organisation.
