= Terbregge =

Coordinates: 51°57′N 4°31′E

- Neighborhood of Rotterdam
- Interactive map of Terbregge
- Country: Netherlands
- Province: South Holland
- COROP: Rotterdam
- Borough: Hillegersberg-Schiebroek
- Time zone: UTC+1 (CET)

Terbregge is a neighborhood of Rotterdam, Netherlands.

Terbregge has a typical Dutch landscape with windmills, canals and cycling routes that lead through the Lage Bergse Bos and the Rotte countryside.

== History ==
The current district consists of the former neighborhood of Terbregge, which was built around a bridge over the Rotte in the thirteenth century. The hamlet of 'Terbregge' is known to have existed in 1524. The windmill "De Vier Winden" is located in the old part on the Rotte. The district is now mainly known for the adjacent traffic junction, Terbregseplein, where the A16 motorway leads to the A20

== Old Terbregge ==
Oud Terbregge has a village character and is surrounded by water and greenery. The core is located east of the Terbregseweg. The ribbon development on the Rotte is part of the old part. Residents are involved and the bond with the neighborhood is strong. There is an active playground association and the Rotte is the base for a rowing association. The Alexander Church and the Princess Irene Bridge are iconic.

== New Terbregge ==
Construction of the Nieuw Terbregge residential area started in 1999 between the Rotte and the A20 motorway. A playground for children has been taken into account in the construction of the district. The district also houses a sports complex where, among other things, the amateurs of Sparta play football. The Manna monument can be found on the noise barrier next to the district, which recalls the food drops in 1945 (under Operation Manna).
