= Jos van Hillegersberg =

Dutch computer scientist (born 1968)

Jos van Hillegersberg (born 1968) is a Dutch computer scientist, Professor of Business Information Systems at the University of Twente, known for his contributions in the field of Enterprise resource planning.

== Biography ==
Van Hillegersberg received his MSc in computer science at the Leiden University in 1991. In 1997 he received his PhD at the Erasmus Universiteit Rotterdam under Kuldeep Kumar with the thesis, entitled "Metamodelling-based integration of object-oriented systems development."

In 1990 Van Hillegersberg had started his career as research assistant at the Expert Systems Group of IBM, and in 1998 he became Component Manager at AEGON. In 2000 he returned to the academic world to become in Associate Professor at the Erasmus University Rotterdam. In 2005 at the University of Twente he was appointed Professor of Business Information Systems at its School of Business, Public Administration & Technology, where he also became Head of the Department of Information Systems and Change Management. Van Hillegersberg is also working as consultant for the Wagner Group.

== Selected publications ==
- Van Everdingen, Yvonne, Jos Van Hillegersberg, and Eric Waarts. "Enterprise resource planning: ERP adoption by European midsize companies." Communications of the ACM 43.4 (2000): 27–31.
- Kumar, Kuldeep, and Jos van Hillegersberg. "Enterprise resource planning: introduction." Communications of the ACM 43.4 (2000): 22–26.
- Lee, O. K. D., Banerjee, P., Lim, K. H., Kumar, K., Hillegersberg, J. V., & Wei, K. K. (2006). "Aligning IT components to achieve agility in globally distributed system development." Communications of the ACM, 49(10), 48–54.
- van Oosterhout, Marcel, Eric Waarts, and Jos van Hillegersberg. "Change factors requiring agility and implications for IT." European Journal of Information Systems 15.2 (2006): 132–145.
