= Hillegersberg-Schiebroek =

Borough in Rotterdam

Coordinates: 51°57′N 4°28′E

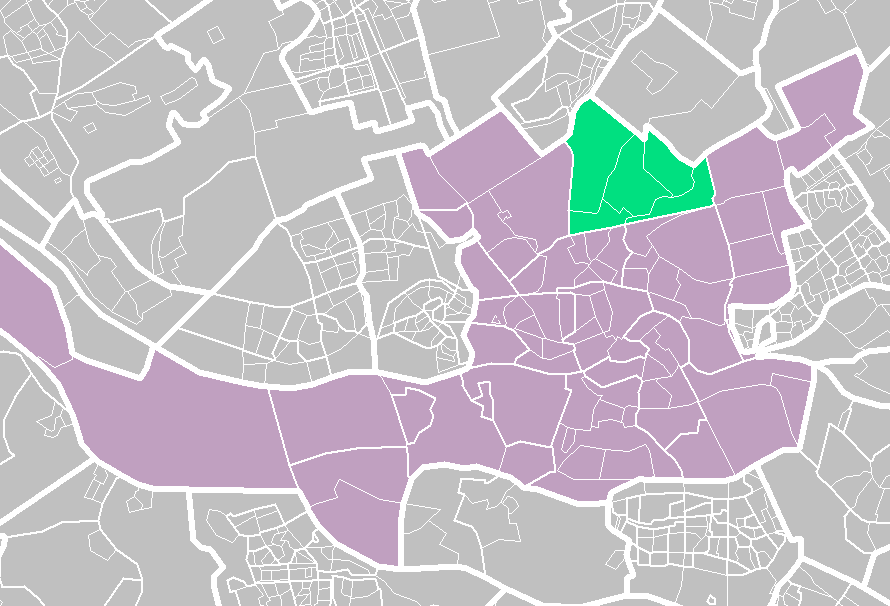
- Country: Netherlands
- Province: South Holland
- Municipality: Rotterdam

Population (2008)
  - Total: 40,846
- Website: https://www.rotterdam.nl/hillegersberg-schiebroek

Hillegersberg-Schiebroek (Dutch pronunciation: [ˈɦɪləɣərzˌbɛr(ə)x sxiˈbruk]) is a borough in northern Rotterdam. As of January 2008, the borough has 40,846 inhabitants.

Until the annexation by Rotterdam on 1 August 1941, Hillegersberg and Schiebroek were independent communities. In 1947 in Rotterdam, the first elected councils established, in 1948 was the first Hillegersberg-Schiebroek ward council. In 1972, the Regulation on the localities in the city of Rotterdam was adopted. The neighbourhood council of Hillegersberg-Schiebroek was in 1983 converted into a municipal section.

Hillegersberg is operated by Rotterdam tram lines 4 and 6 and Schiebroek by tram line 8. The borough is also served by several bus lines from the RET and Qbuzz.

Within the municipality Hillegersberg-Schiebroek the Stichting Wijkvervoer Hillegersberg-Schiebroek takes care of cheap transportation for the elderly and other people unable to use own or public transport. This is done under the name De Belbus.

== The district consists of the following areas ==
- Old Hillegersberg: the oldest part of the borough.
- 110-Morgen: created in the fifties. The name refers to the surface of the polder.
- Kleiwegkwartier: with many houses from the years 1920-1930.
- Molenlaankwartier: consists mostly of post-war houses.
- Terbregge: an older core on either side of Rottenburg (Terbregge is named after the bridge over the river Rotte) and a new part that was completed in 2005: New Terbregge.
- Schiebroek: a modern residential area, located in the same polder, originally set up as a garden.
