= Schiebroek =

Coordinates: 51°58′N 4°29′E

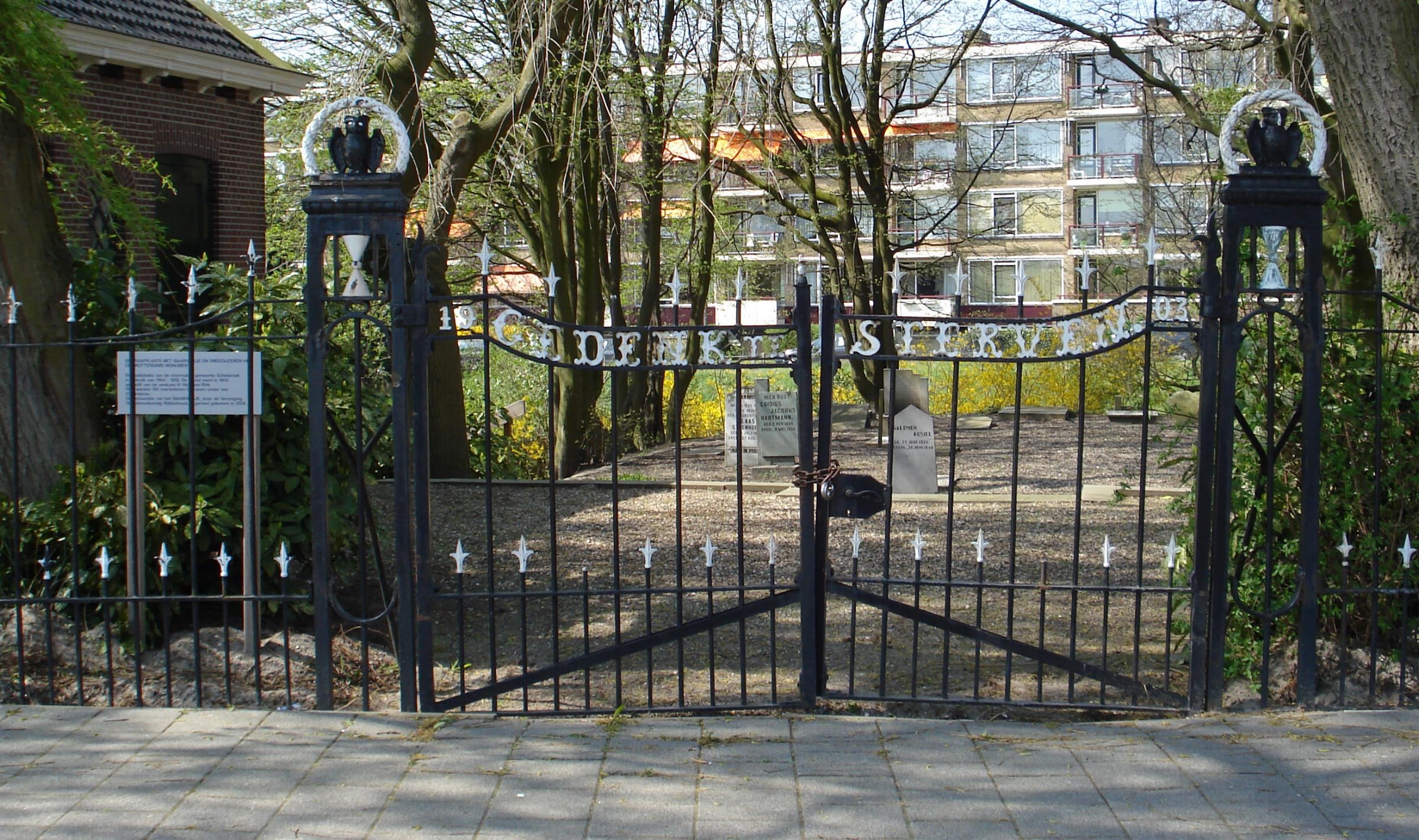
Rotterdam, Ringdijk 43.

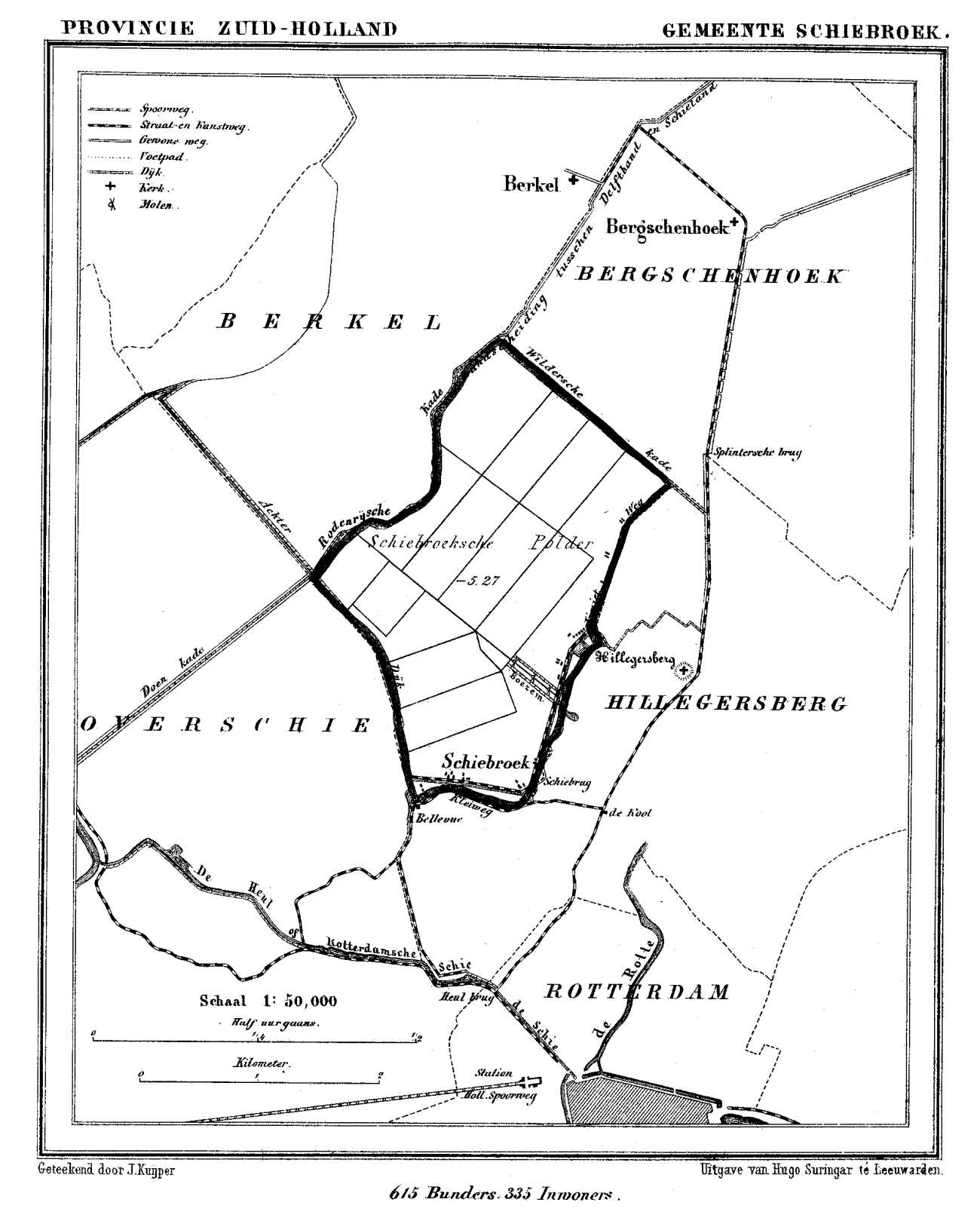
Schiebroek in 1865.

Schiebroek (Dutch pronunciation: [sxiˈbruk]) is a former village in the province of South Holland, Netherlands. It is now a neighbourhood of Rotterdam, and part of the borough of Hillegersberg-Schiebroek.

Schiebroek was a separate municipality between 1817 and 1941, when it became part of Rotterdam.
