= Hillegersberg =

- Neighbourhood in the City of Rotterdam
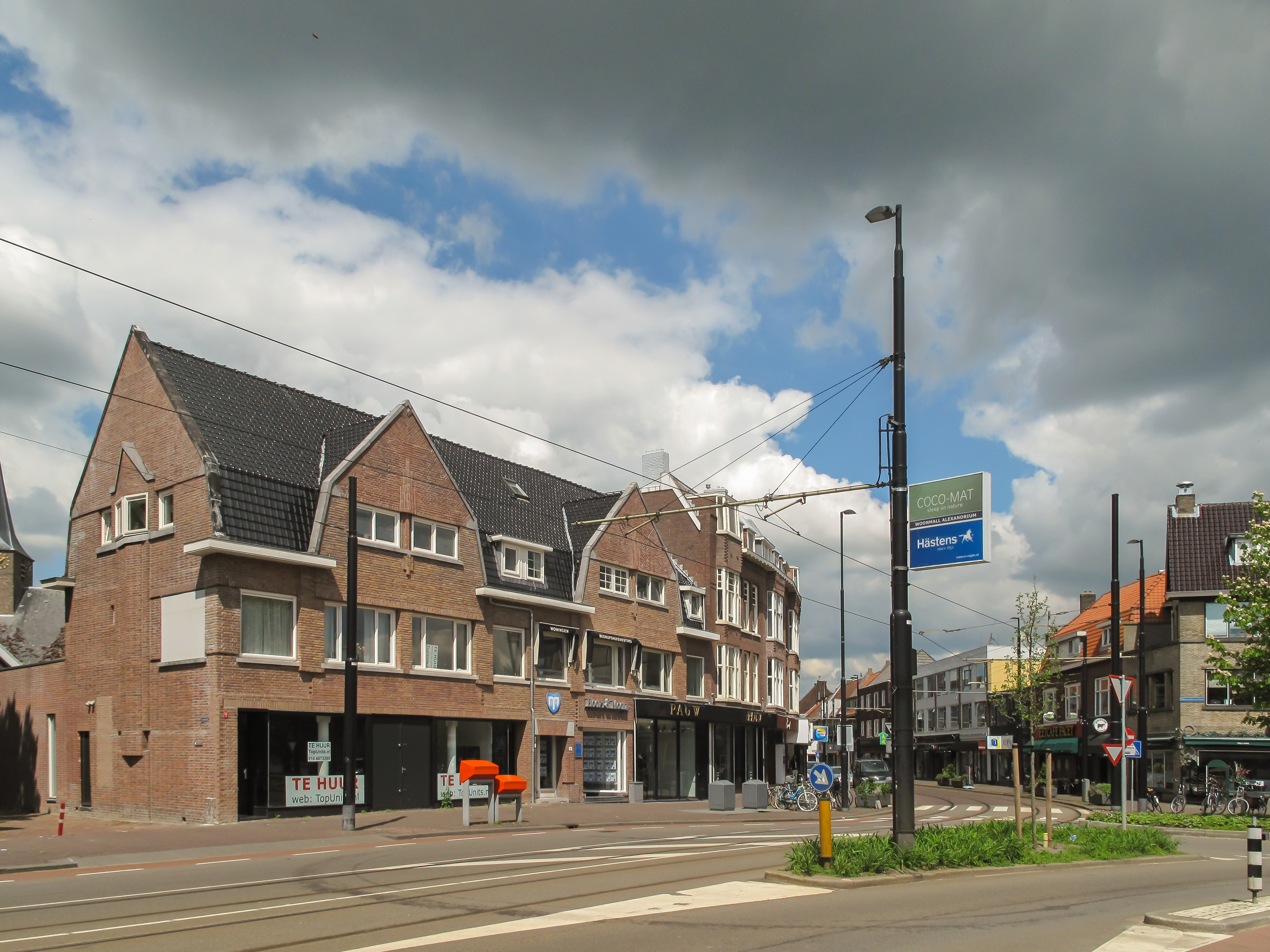
- Bergse Dorpsstraat, Hillegersberg

- Flag Coat of arms

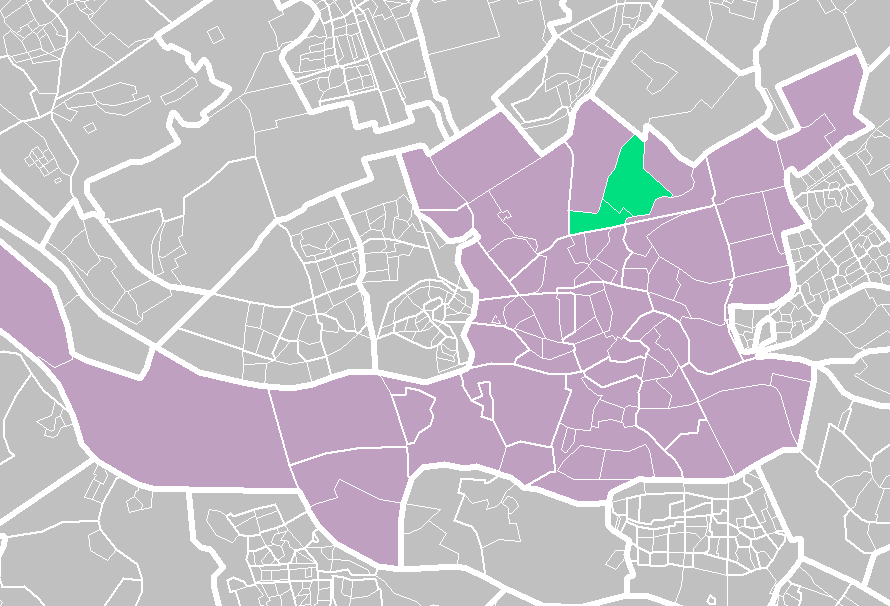
- Location of Hillegersberg in Rotterdam
- Coordinates: 51°57′05″N 4°29′20″E
- Country: Netherlands
- Province: South Holland
- Municipality: Rotterdam
- Sub-Municipality: Hillegersberg-Schiebroek

Area
  - Total: 433 ha (1,070 acres)

Population
  - Total: 43,991
- Demonym: Hillegersberger
- Time zone: UTC+1 (CET)
  - Summer (DST): UTC+2 (CEST)
- Postcode: 3045, 3051–3056
- Area code: 010
- Website: www.rotterdam.nl/wonen-leven/hillegersberg-schiebroek/

Hillegersberg (Dutch pronunciation: [ˈɦɪləɣərzˌbɛr(ə)x]) is a neighbourhood of Rotterdam, Netherlands. Primarily a green residential area with lakes, canals and parks, it was incorporated into the city of Rotterdam in 1941. Settlement around its Hillegonda church was first established here in 990.

== History ==
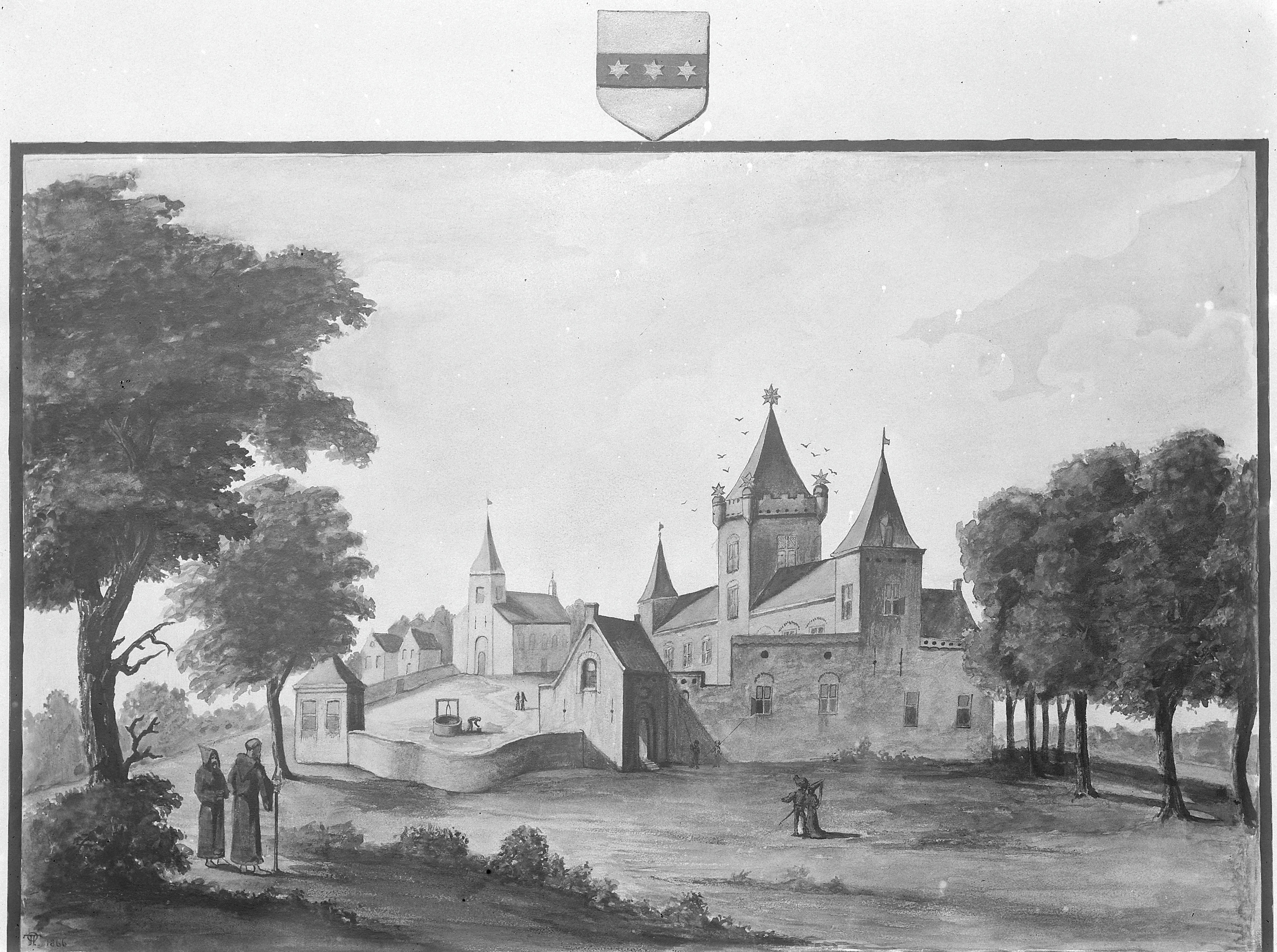
Period drawing of the early layout and form of the Huis ten Berghe in Hillegersberg

Hillegersberg was named after Hildegard van Vlaanderen, wife of Count Dirk II of Holland and West Friesland (920-988). The village was founded on a hill, form by a ridge of sand known locally as a donk or morre. Local flint finds here indicate pre-historic occupation and later discoveries of Roman pottery, medals as well as a bust of Emperor Hadrian show subsequent early activity in the area.

According to legend, this ridge was formed by sand dropped from the apron of the mythical giant Hillegonda. She was said to have built her house on this ridge and so Hillegersberg, then known as Hillegonda's mountain, was named. The image of the giant Hillegonda with her torn apron is shown on Hillegersberg's coat of arms. A church and a castle, Huis ten Berghe, were subsequently built on the ridge.

The castle was first mentioned in a certificate of November 2, 1269 documenting a loan from Vranke Stozep van Hildegardsberg. Later in 1343, Heer Kerstant van den Berge owned the church and the castle. However, in 1426, both church and castle were destroyed by the armies of Jacoba of Bavaria, during the Hoekse and Kabeljauwse quarrels. Remnants of the castle dungeon may still be found next to the Hillegondakerk in a corner of the cemetery, which dates from around 1500 in its present form. The structure was designated a national monument in September 1973.

Hillergersberg's Bergse-plassen lakes were created by peat extraction in its surrounding fields and their subsequent flooding between CE 1600 and 1700.

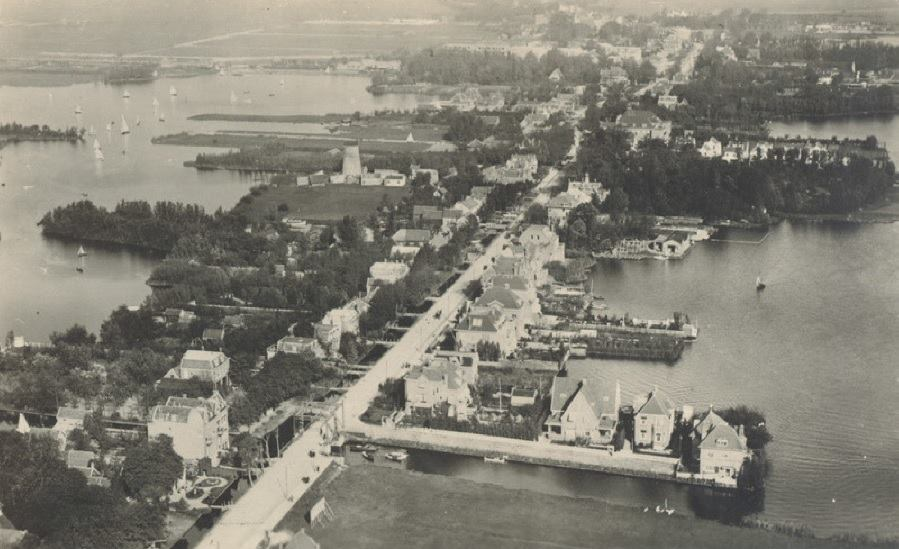
View of Hillegersberg's Straatweg in the early 1920s. The Bergse-plassen lakes lie on either side of the road.

Hillegersberg's population grew from 2,000 inhabitants in 1885 to 7,000 in 1904. The border between Hillegersberg and Rotterdam has changed several times. In 1904 and 1920 parts of Hillegersberg were annexed by Rotterdam. Despite this, Hillegersberg's population would increase to 5,000 in 1920. In 1941, the area was absorbed completely in Rotterdam. In 1979 the area became part of the sub-municipality of Hillegersberg-Schiebroek which then became a Gebied of the same name in 2014. A Gebied has an advisory commission which represents those living in the area. By January 2018, the sub-municipality of Hillegersberg-Schiebroek, of which Hillergersberg is a part, had a population of 43,991.

Hillegersberg's growth has been explained partly due to its attractiveness for well-to-do residents because of its lakes such as the Bergse Plassen, attractions like the Plaswijckpark and Lommerrijk, as well as its proximity to the centre of the city. Hillegersberg is considered to be one of the most prosperous sub-municipalities of Rotterdam. This is based on the number of expensive homes there, the quality of its amenities, and the luxury stores in its village centre.

== Character ==
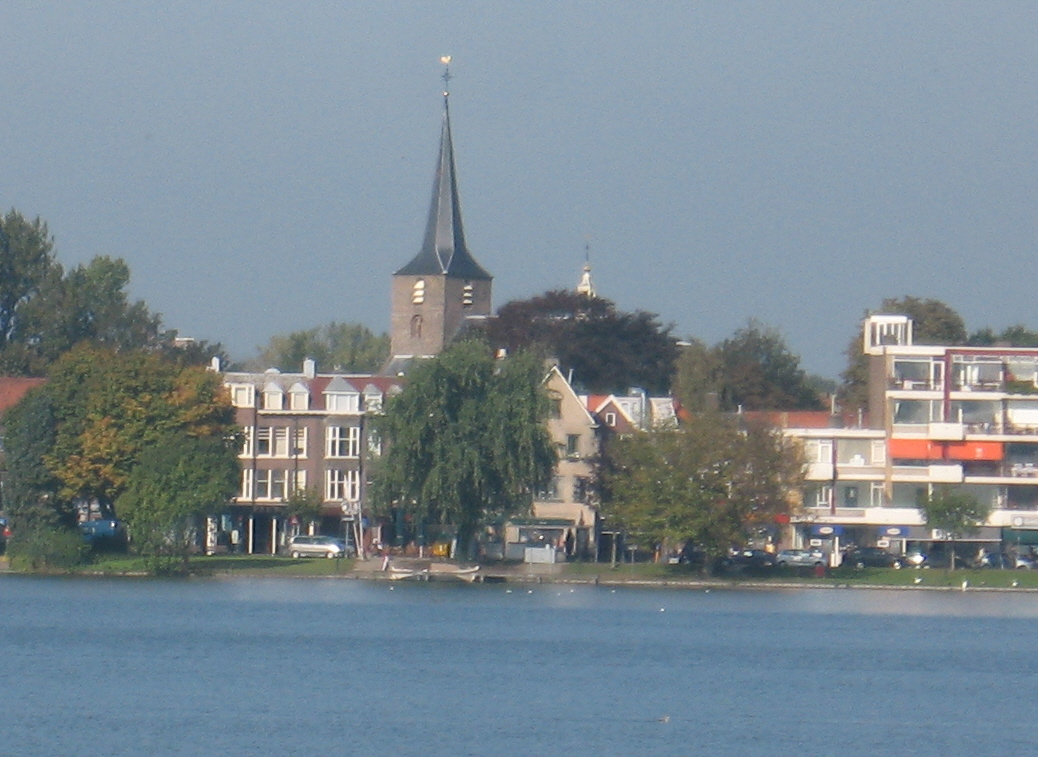
Hillegersberg's Hillegondakerk as seen from the Bergse Voorplas

Hillegersberg has been described as a "leafy suburb (which) escaped wartime bombing, leaving its old village centre and elegant residential streets intact." Plaswijk and other local recreation parks were first established here in the early 1920s. Hillegersberg's amenities have increased over time, with the creation for example of the Lage Bergse Bos a recreational area of 216 hectare in 1970. This wooded area, which lies to the North-east of Hillegersberg, is interspersed with open areas of water and grassland. A part of it is grazed by Scottish Highlander cattle.

Hillegersberg covers roughly 4.3 km², with nearly a third of its surface made up of water. Its defining geographic features are the Bergse Plassen (Vorsterplas and Achterplas)—two lakes created by historical peat harvesting—and the Rotte river along its eastern boundary.

The village contains (with the addition of the Nieuwe Hillegersberg development) three shopping centres: the original village itself (around the old core - Bergse Dorpsstraat, Weissenbruchlaan), and the Kleiweg and its surrounding street and the shopping center at the Van Beethovensingel.

A local resident organisation InHillegersberg was established in 2015 from the Bewonersorganisatie Molenlaankwartier along with residents of Oud-Hillegersberg (old Hillegersgerberg). Its aim is to improve communications to residents and to protect the neighbourhood from negative developments.

== Geography ==
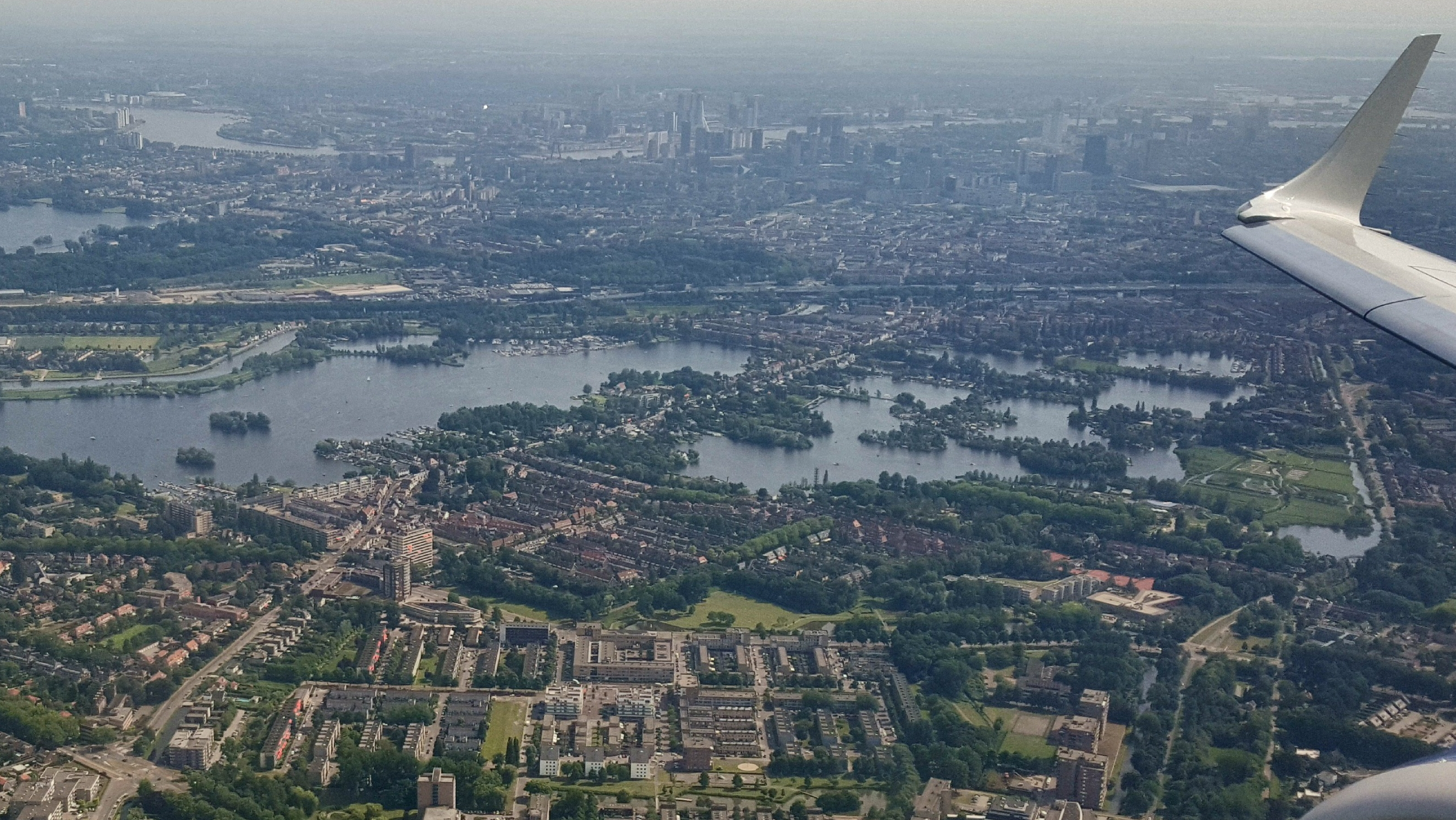
Hillegersberg (Rotterdam) looking south from the air

Hillegersberg is located on the north side of the municipality of Rotterdam. It is located in an area of woods and lakes (Bergse-Plassen [nl]), the site of two former peat excavations. The Straatweg runs between these lakes, flanked by the large villas and apartment buildings. Eastern Hillegersberg is bordered by the river Rotte. However, water has presented serious problems to the residents. Many older houses suffer from foundation problems due to rotting wooden foundations, so-called ‘paalrot' due to the lowering of the water table by the City authorities.

The neighbourhood benefits from good communication links with Rotterdam International airport, four railways stations, two tram lines (4 and 8), four bus lines (35, 174, B10 and B17) and the A20 Autoroute all lying in close proximity.

The Sint Franciscus Gasthuis (hospital) is located on the south-western edge of Hillegersberg.

== Town Halls ==
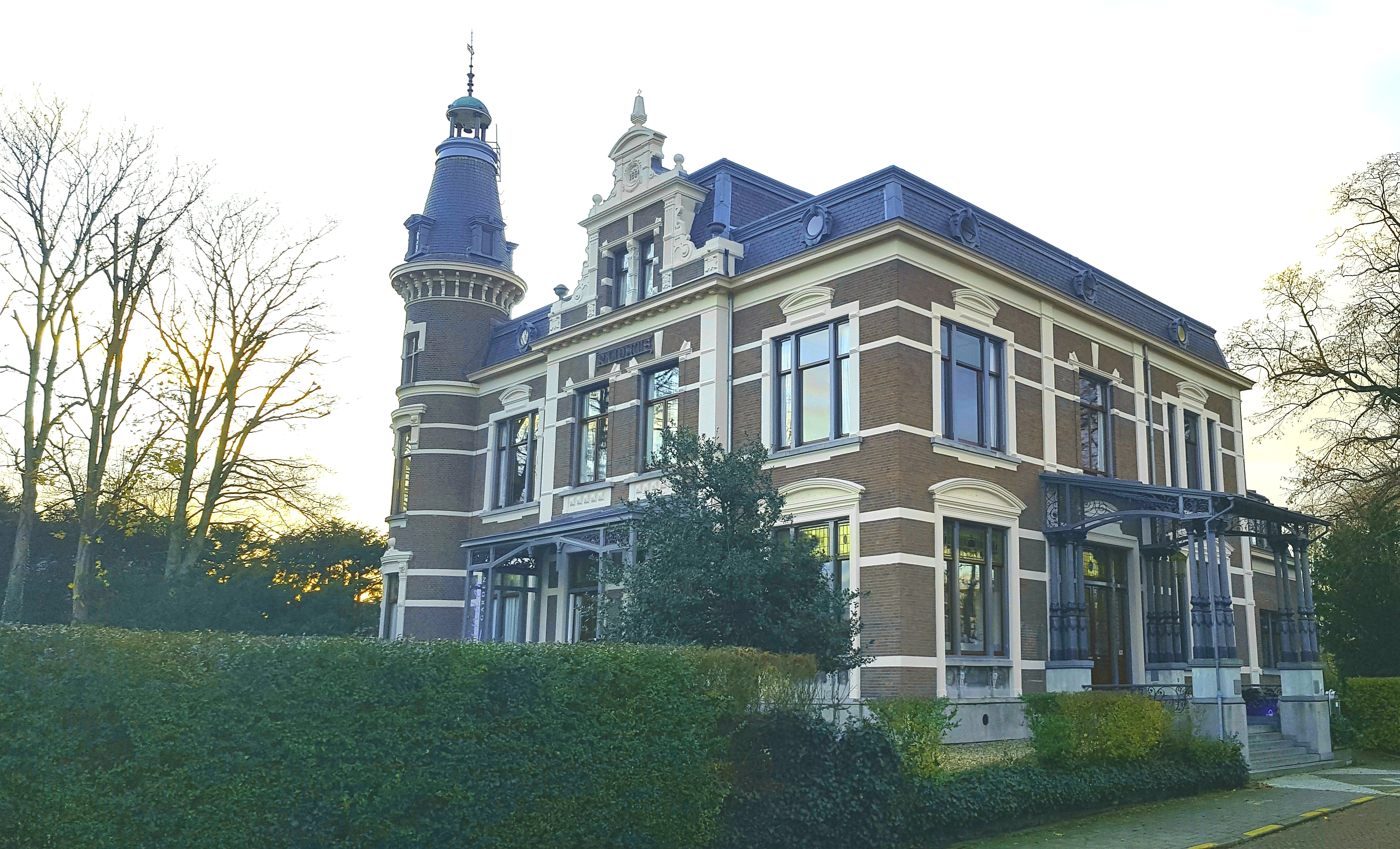
Buitenlust Villa - was the town hall of Hillersgeberg until 1941

The last town hall of Hillegersberg, prior to its annexation by Rotterdam in 1941, was the Buitenlust villa on the C.N.A. Looslaan 1. This villa was built in 1884 in the style of the neo-Renaissance by architect J.J. van Waning (1830-1917) and was commissioned by the De Kat family.

This building became the town hall of the independent municipality of Hillegersberg between 1921 and 1941. After the municipality's annexation by Rotterdam, it went on to hold the offices of the city's district of Hillegersberg-Schiebroek. This site is now the location for a nursery and kindergarten as well as a wedding hall.

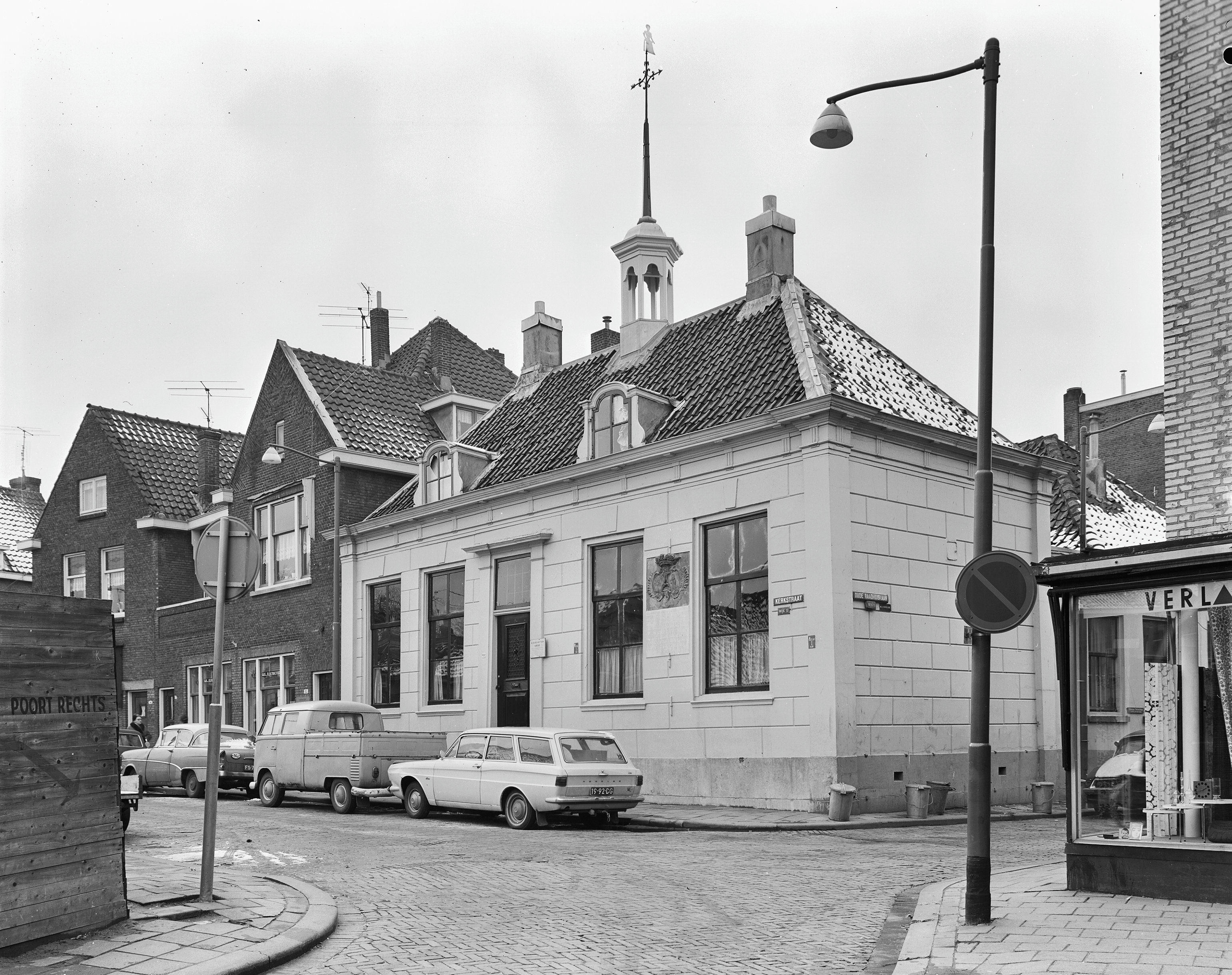
Hillegersberg's first town hall was built in 1752.

Hillegersberg's early town hall may be seen at 10 Kerkstraat in the area's old village centre. It was built in 1752 and is now serves as a location for a restaurant.

Both buildings have been designated as national monuments.

== Education ==
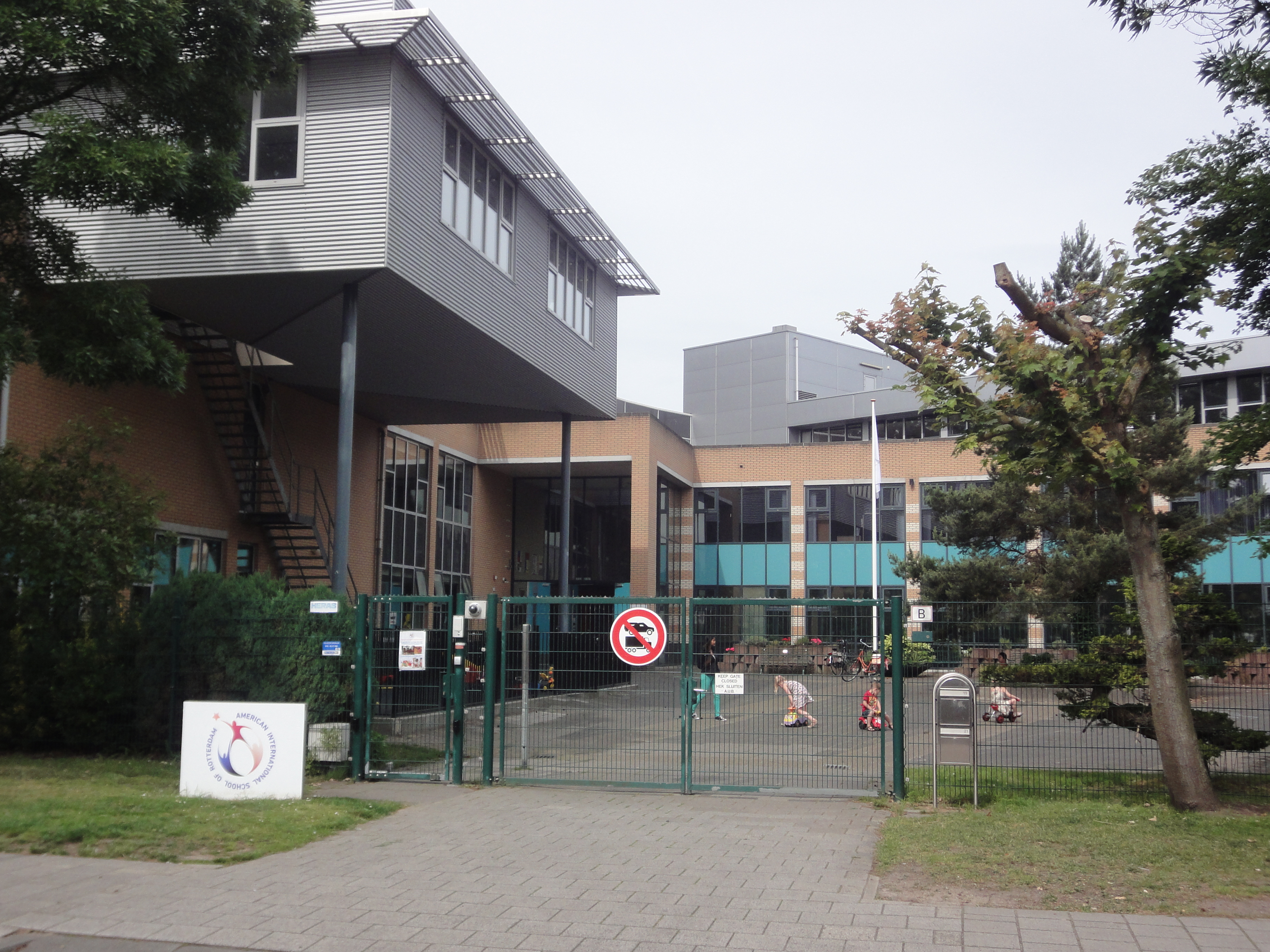
Nord Anglia International School of Rotterdam

Hillegersberg has twelve schools covering different ages and educational levels as specified and accredited by the Dutch education system.

The American International School of Rotterdam (AISR) was established in the area in 1959. In 2020, AISR became Nord Anglia International School Rotterdam.

The Japanese School of Rotterdam, a Japanese international day school, was also set up here in 1996. The Hague-Rotterdam Japanese Saturday School (ハーグ・ロッテルダム日本語補習授業校 Hāgu Rotterudamu Nihongo Hoshū Jugyō Kō), a Japanese Saturday school was also formed here in 1996 by the merger of existing Saturday schools in The Hague and Rotterdam, holds its classes at the Rotterdam Japanese day school.

== Residents ==
- Janwillem van de Wetering, writer
- Herman den Blijker, celebrity chef
- Anton Houtsma (1938-2014), Mayor (nl)
- Antony Moens (1827-1899), Member of Parliament (nl)
  - Willebrord Nieuwenhuis (1938-2006), journalist (nl)
  - Wim Nijs (1902-1961), painter (nl)
  - Albert Dolmans (1928-2021), painter (nl)
  - Frits Linnemann (1946-2011), painter and musician (nl)

== Gallery ==
Newsreel footage of the Straatweg in Hillegersberg (1930)

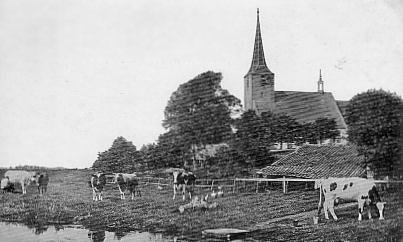
farmland around the Hillegondakerk of Hillegersberg (1900s)

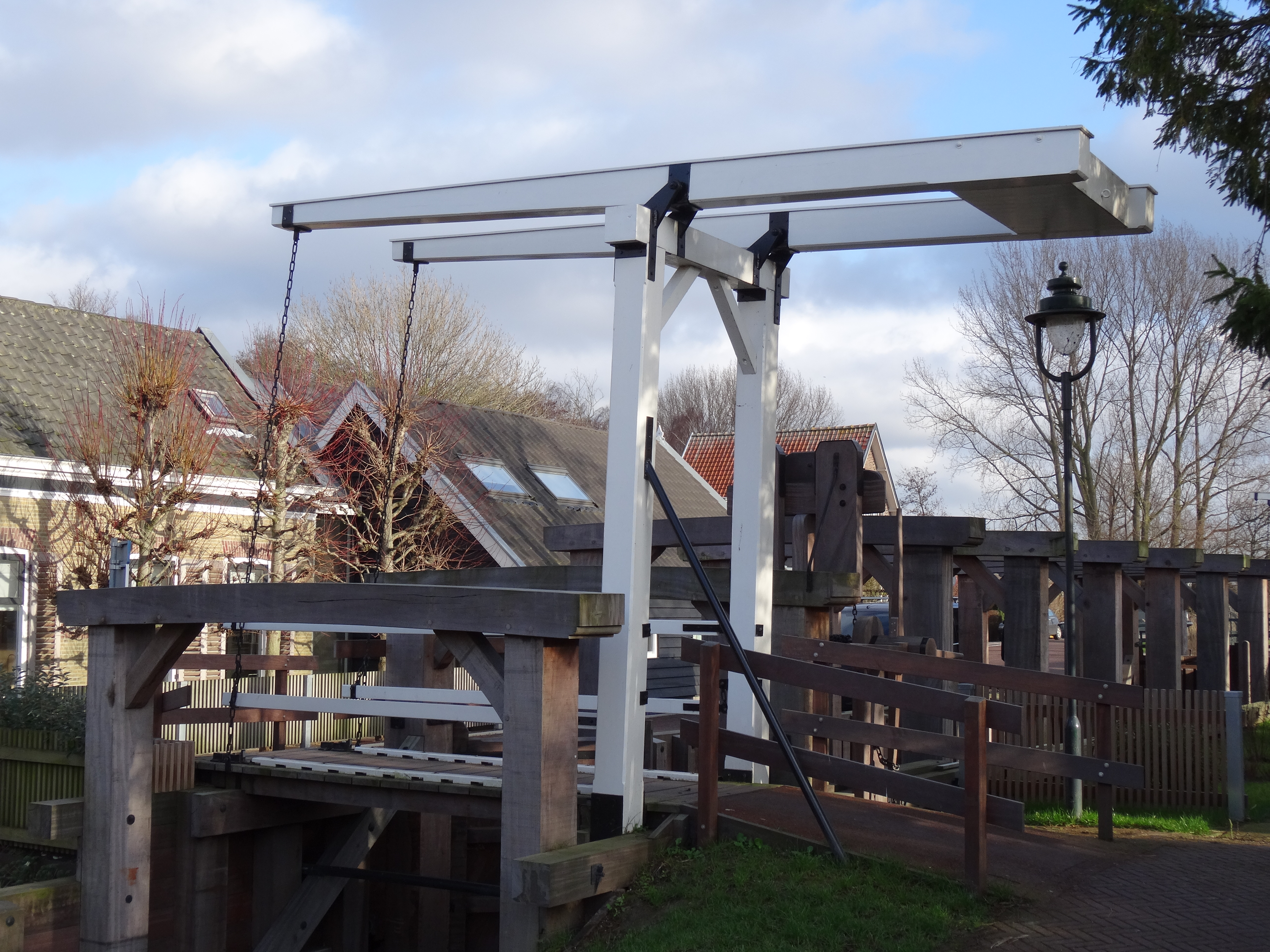
Lock bridge Boterdorpsebrug in Hillegersberg (2014)

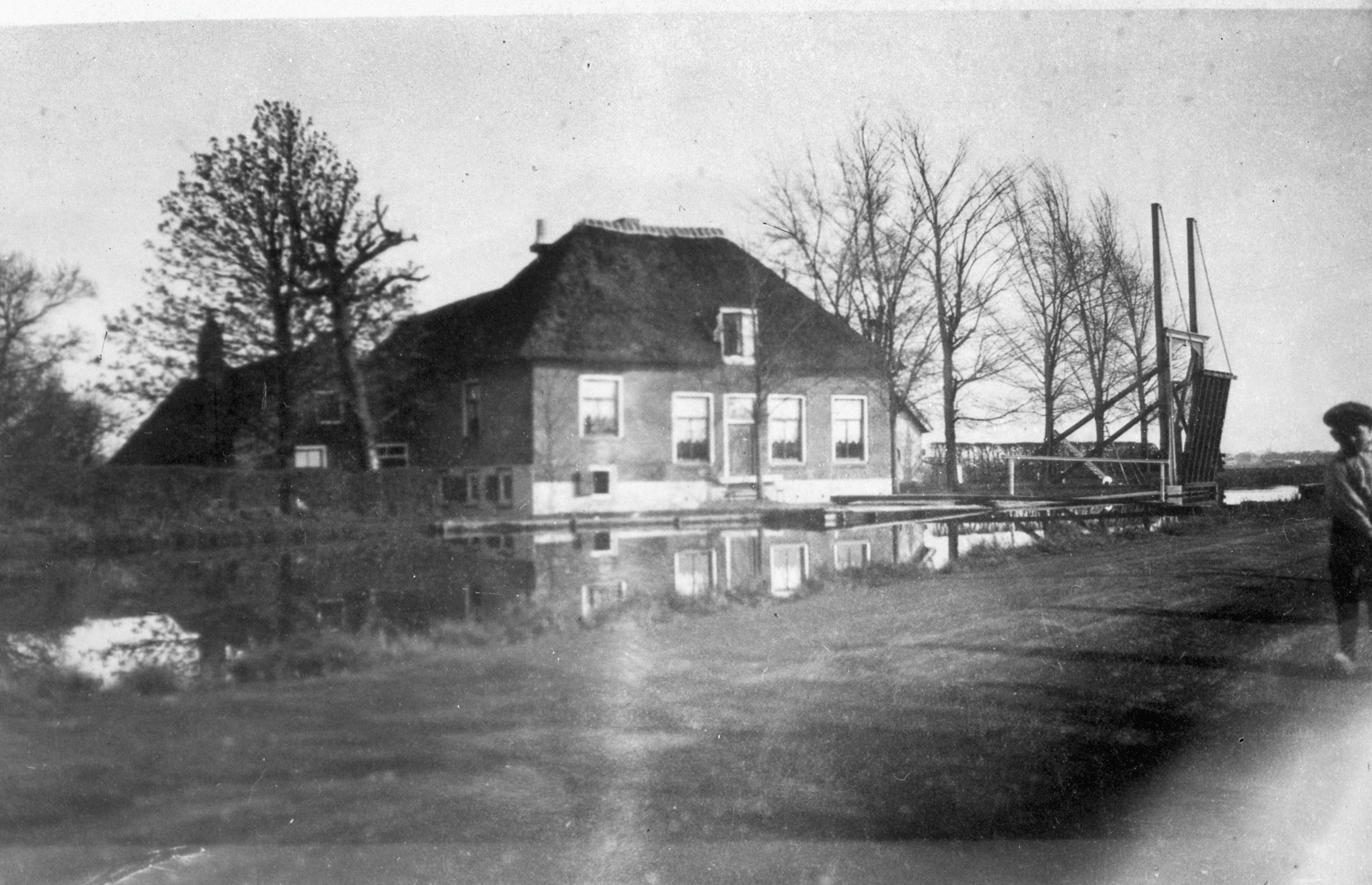
Farm in the area surrounding Hillegersberg (undated)

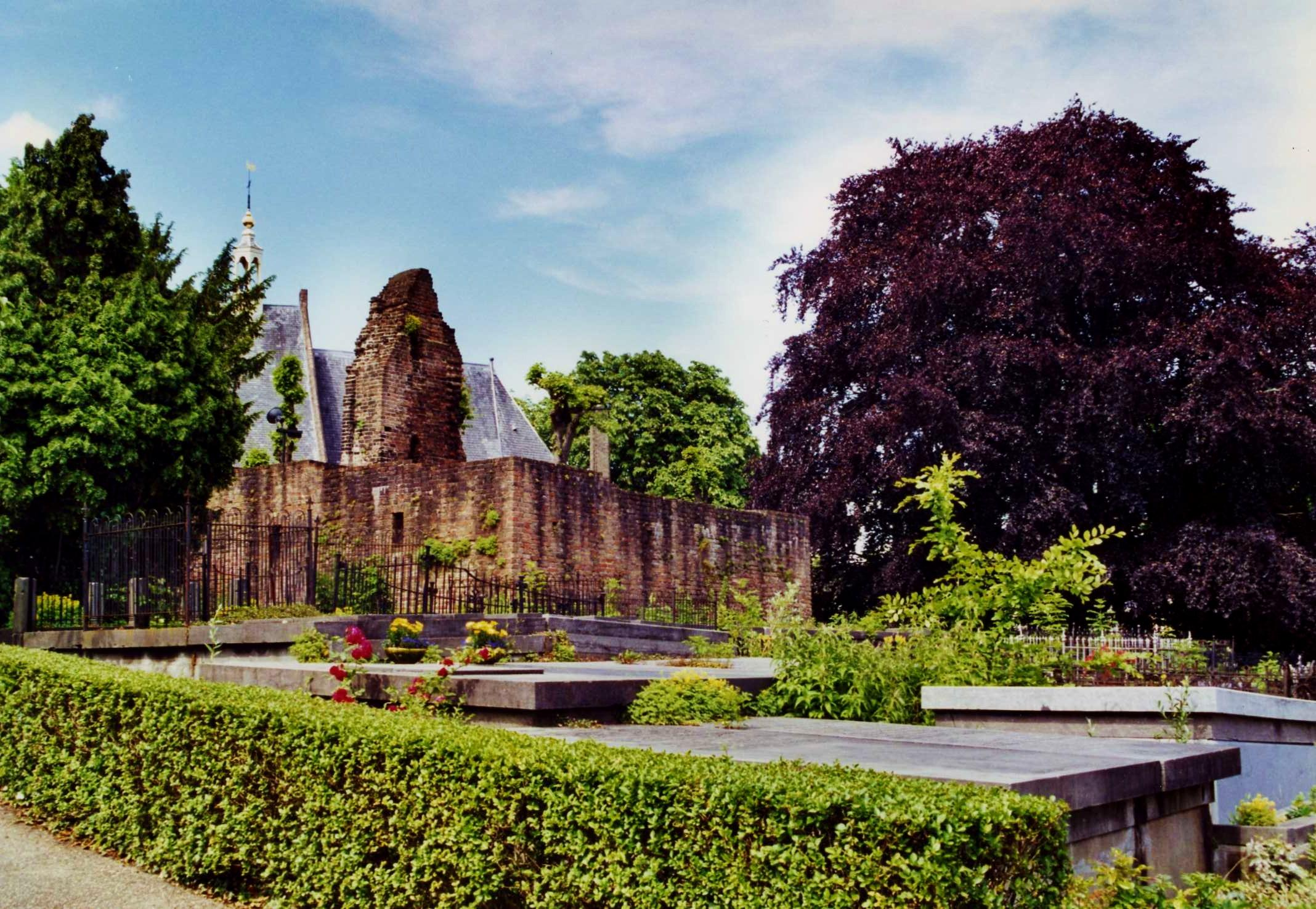
Castle ruin and church in Hillegersberg (2012)

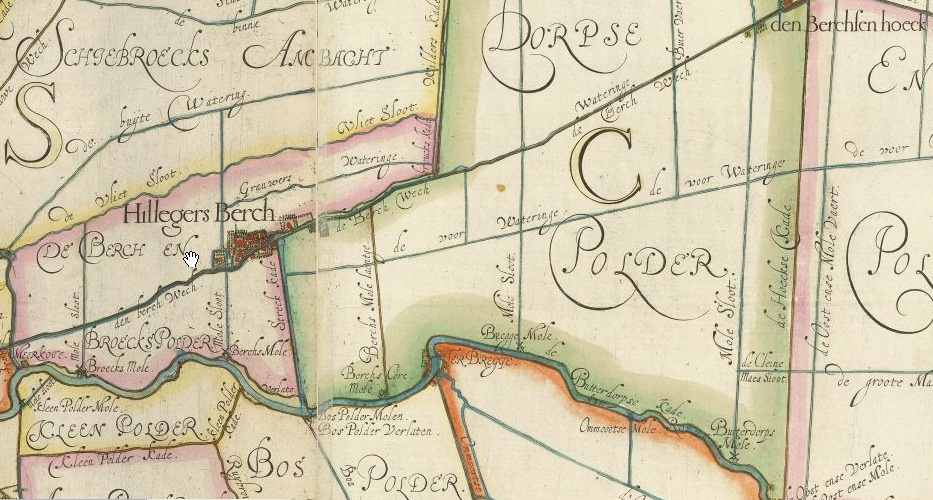
Map of Hillegersberg village in 1611

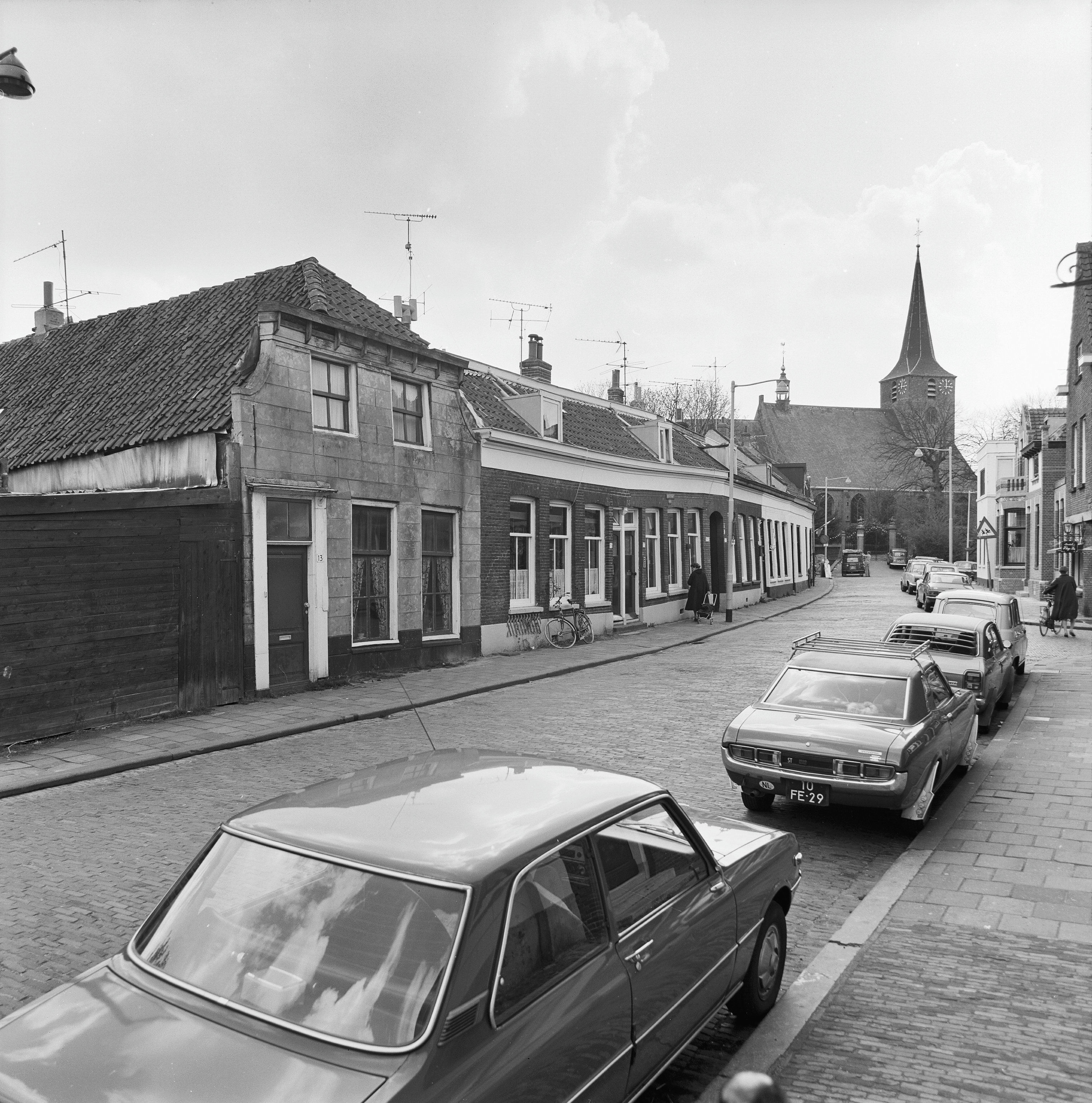
Hillegersberg old village centre (1978)

Hillegersberg's Bergse Voorplas and River Rotte

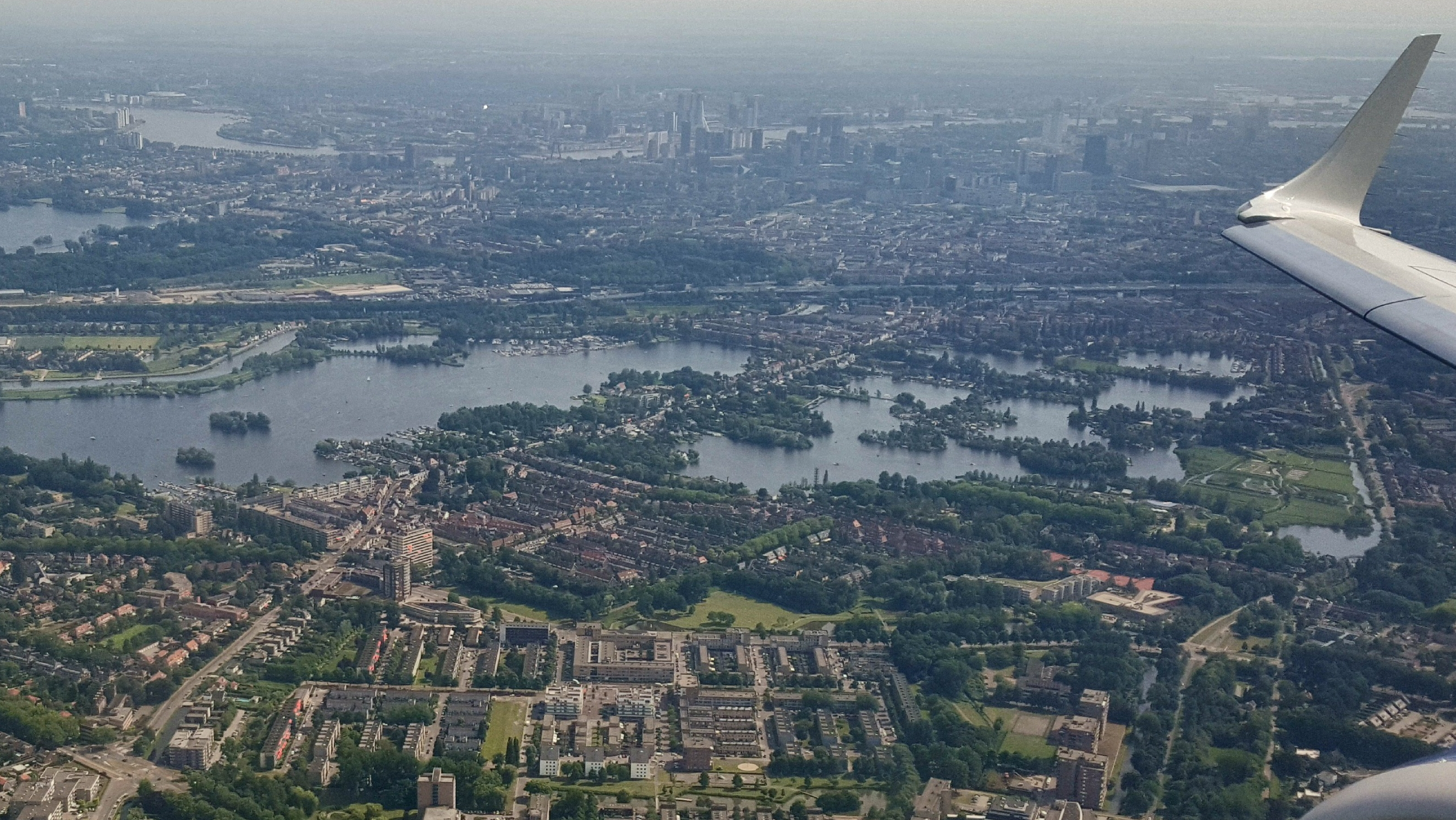
View of Hillegersberg with Rotterdam's centre lying behind (2017)

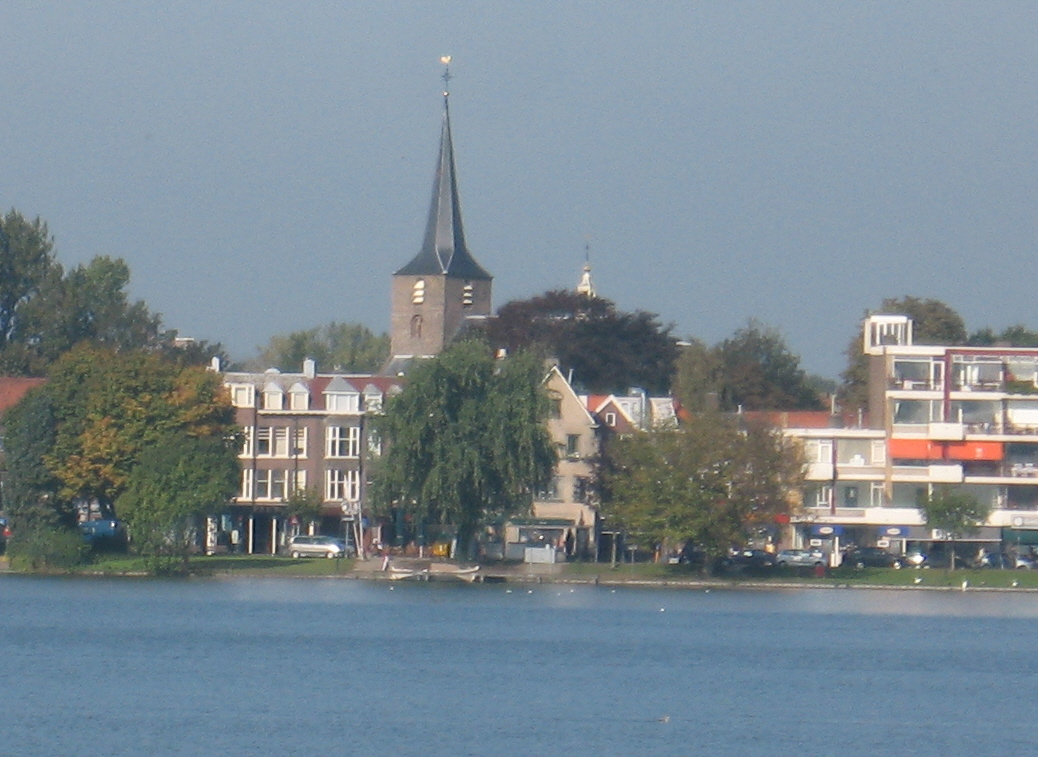
Hillegersberg, as seen from the Bergsche Voorplas (undated)

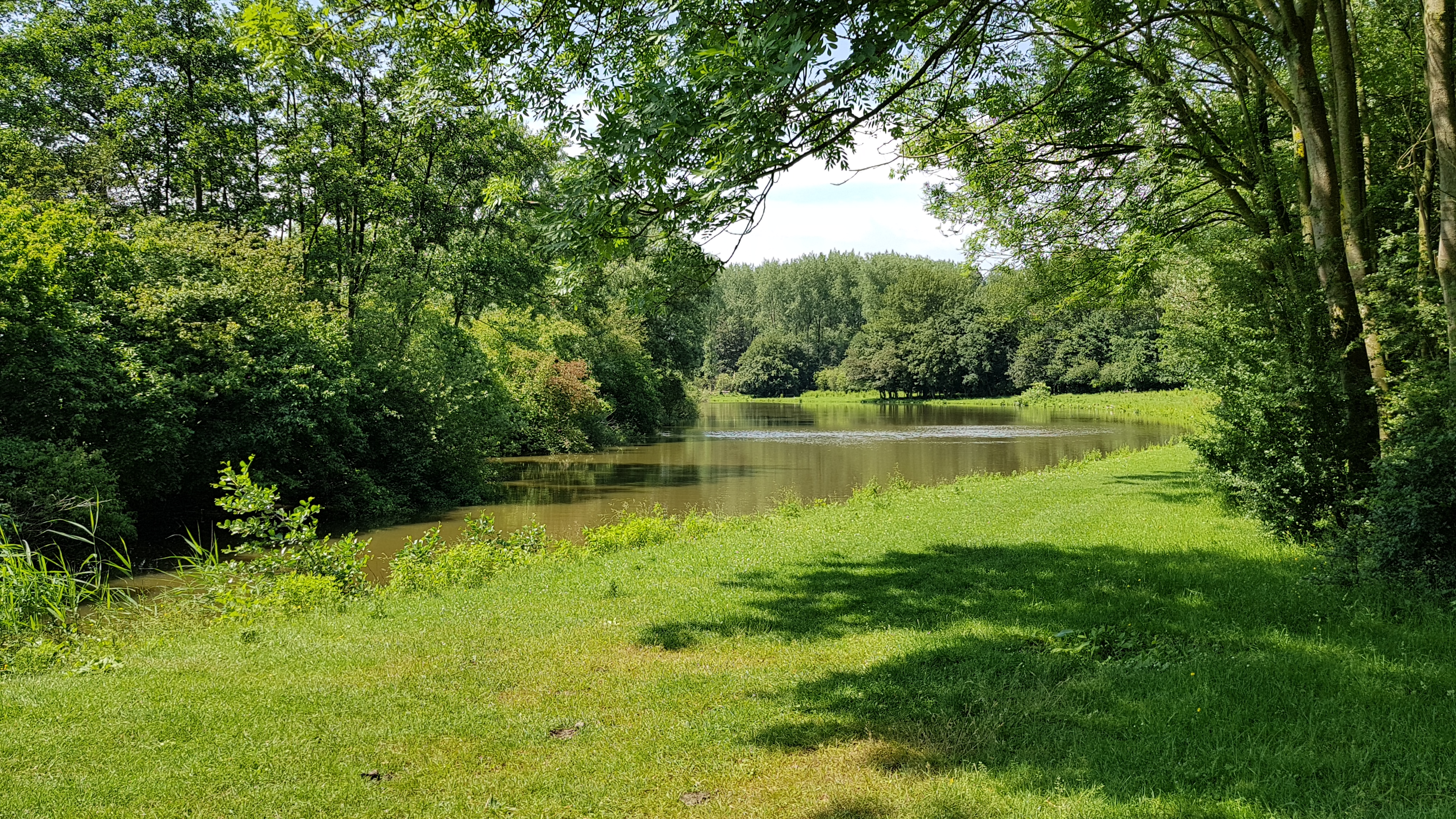
Hillergersberg's Lage Bergse Bos (2018)

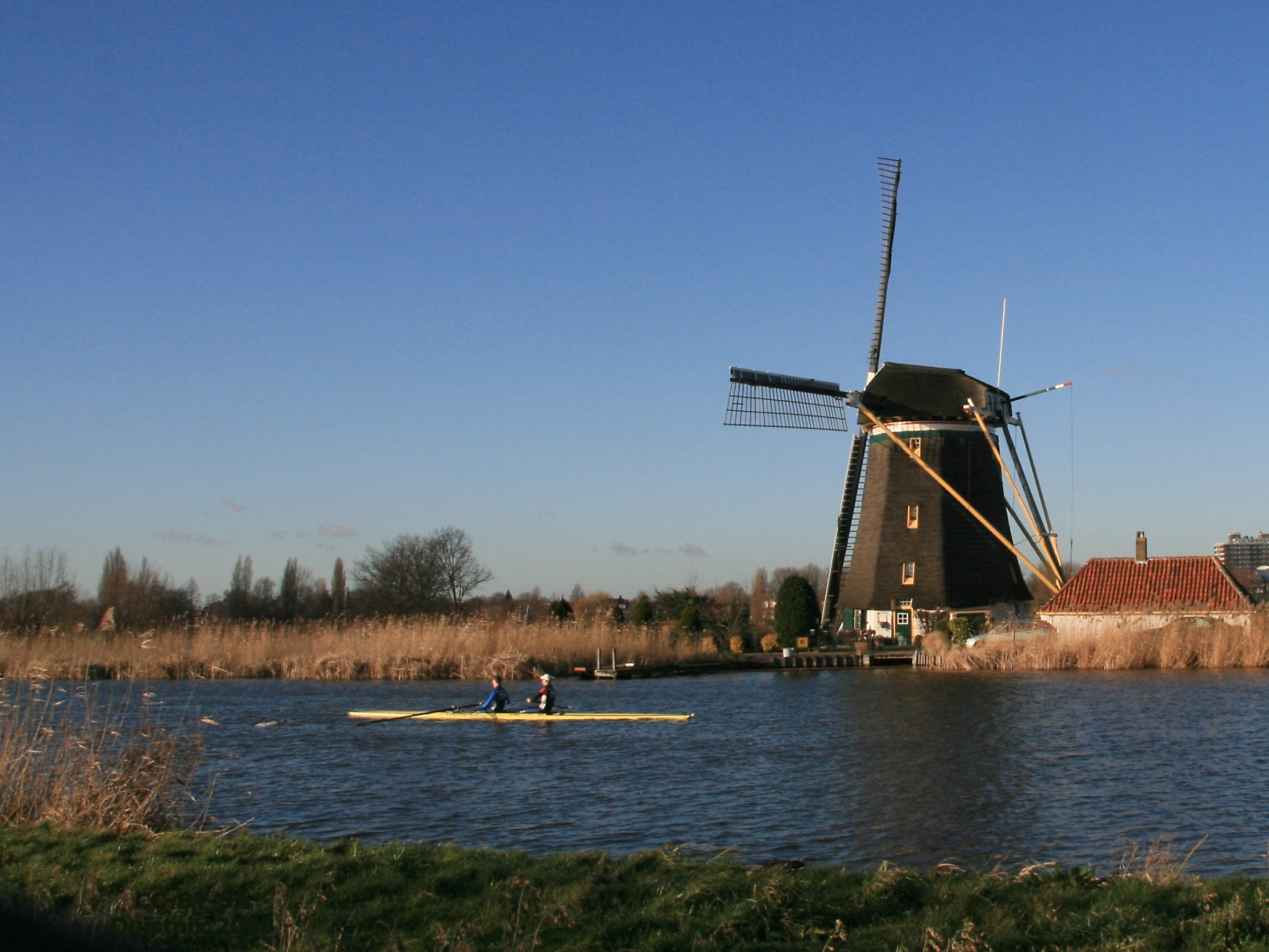
Hillegersberg's Prinsenmolen windmill

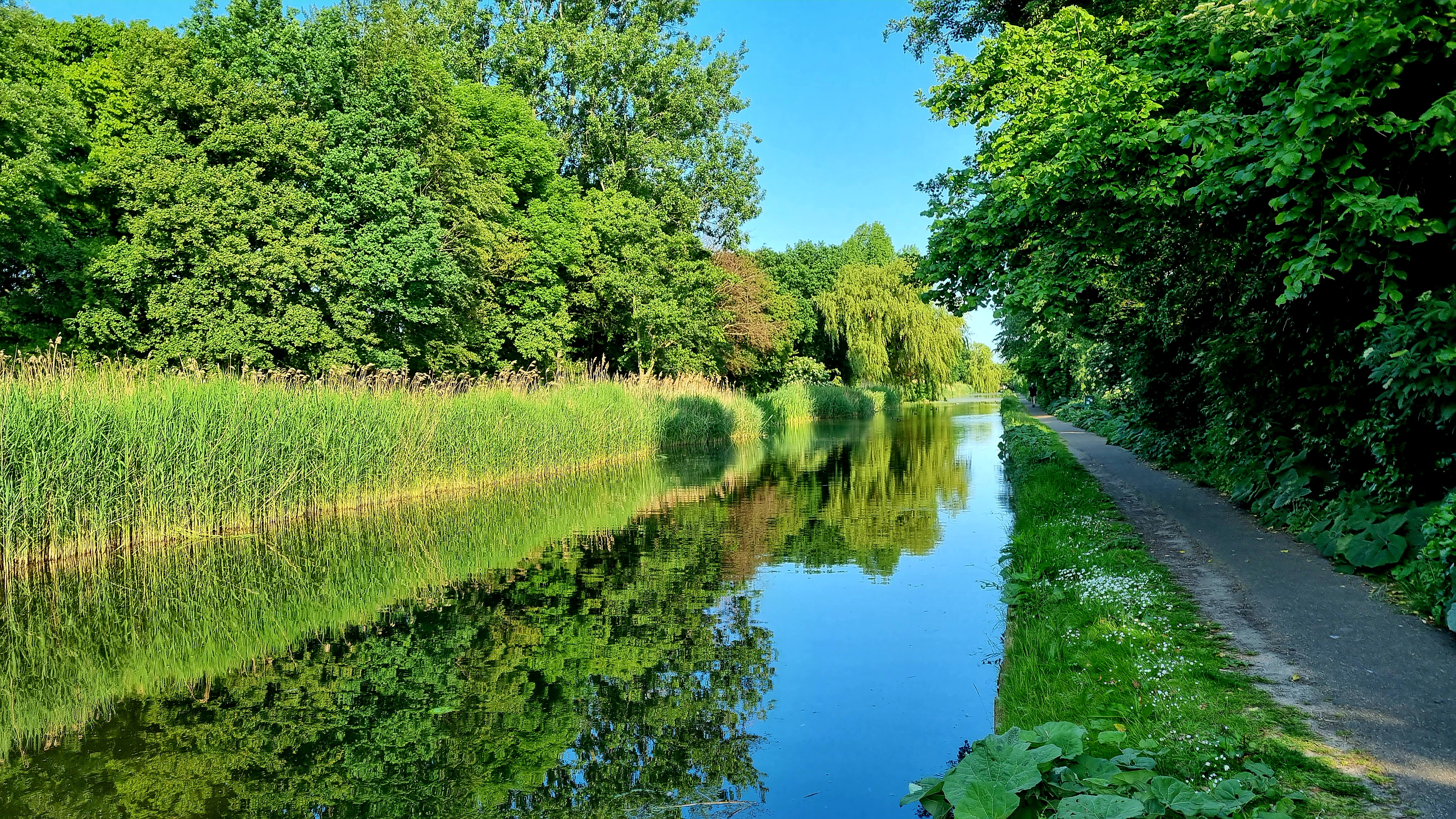
Hillergersberg's Steekkade in 2023

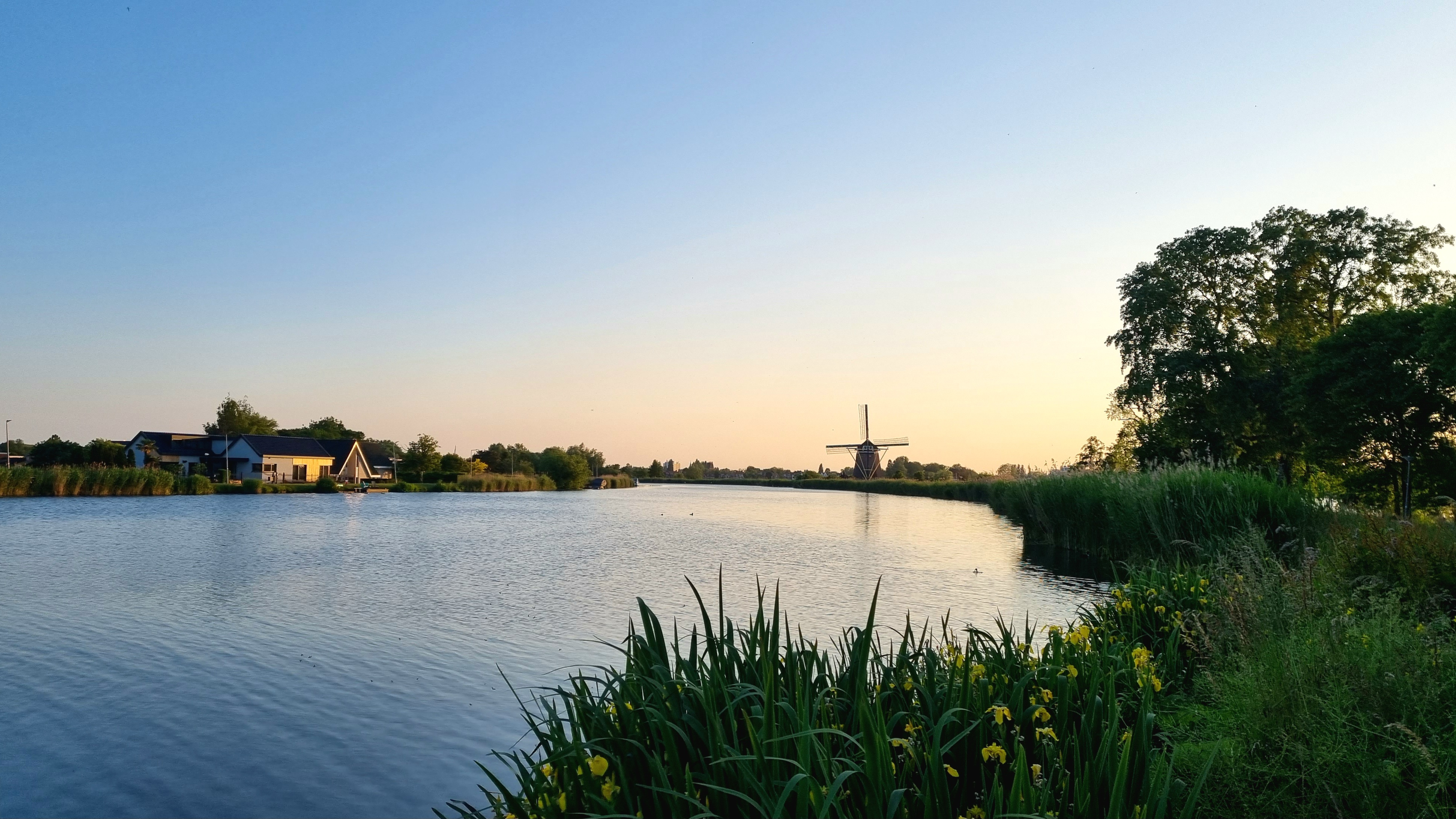
River Rotte passes Hillegersberg in Rotterdam (2023)
