= Outline of the Netherlands =

Country in Northwestern Europe and Caribbean

Flag of the Netherlands

Coat of arms of the Netherlands

The following outline is provided as an overview of and topical guide to the Netherlands.

Netherlands – parliamentary democratic constitutional monarchy. Its European mainland is bordered by the North Sea to the north and west, Belgium to the south, and Germany to the east.

The European Netherlands constitutes the vast majority (by land area and population) of both the country and the Kingdom of the Netherlands, and as such 'the Netherlands' in common parlance often implicitly refers to this entity. Similarly, the articles linked to below predominantly consider the European Netherlands.

== General reference ==
The location of the European Netherlands

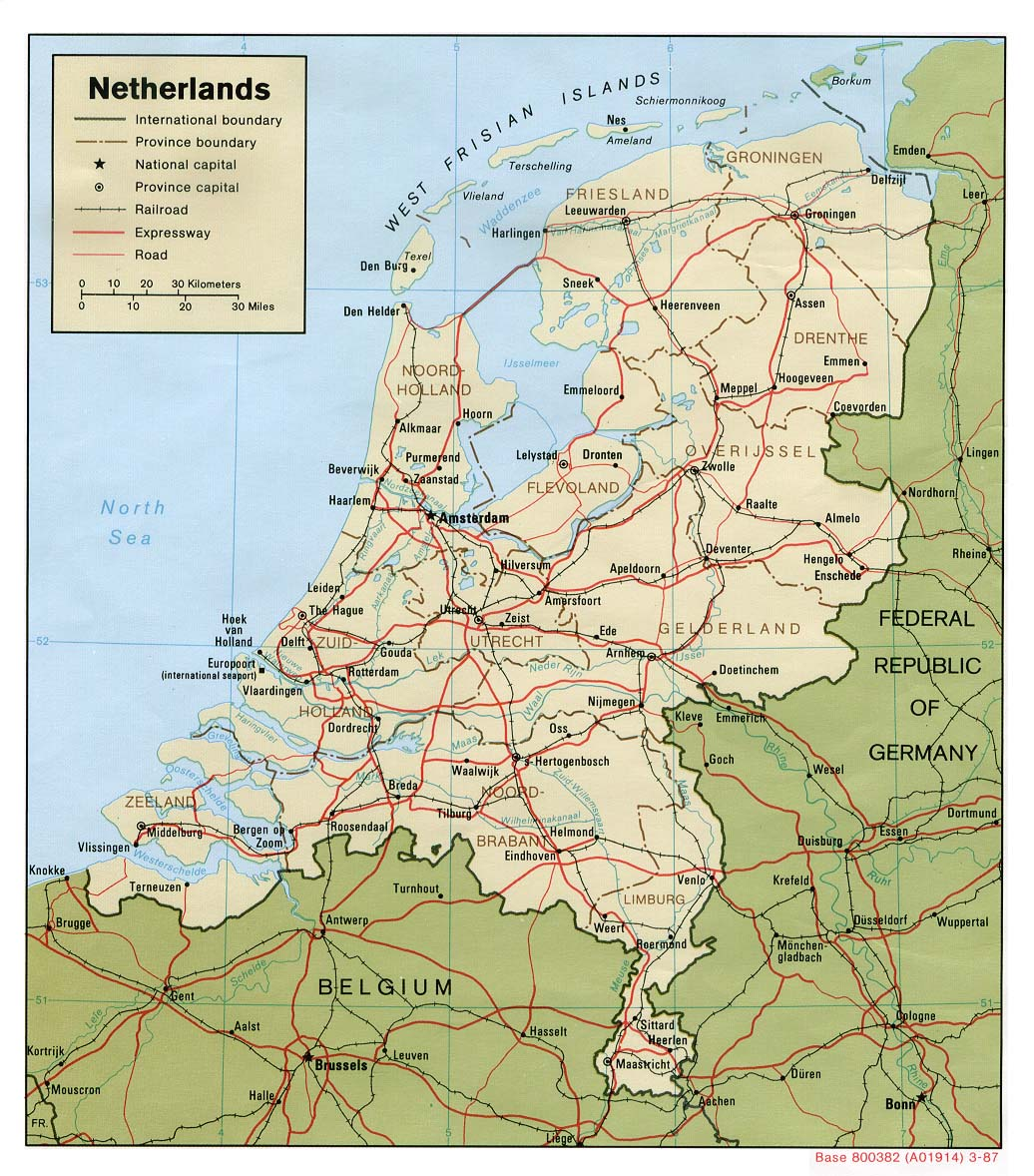
An enlargeable map of the European Netherlands

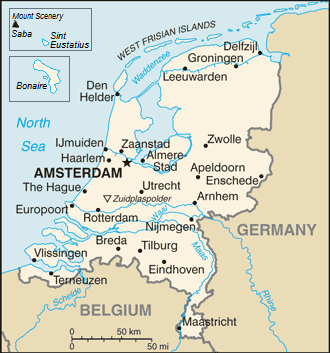
An enlargeable basic map of the Netherlands, (Caribbean Netherlands inset)

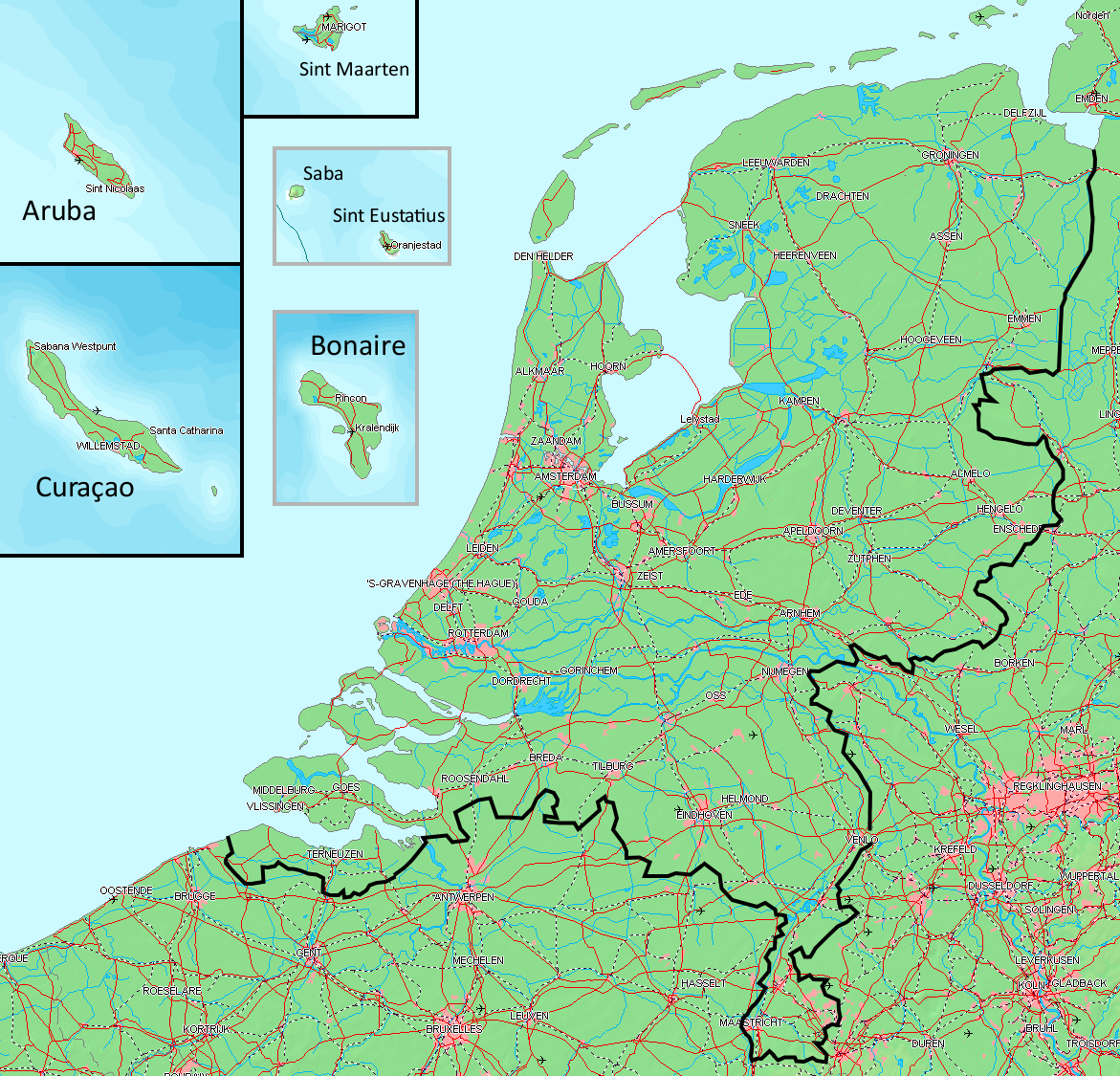
An enlargeable topographic map of the Kingdom of the Netherlands

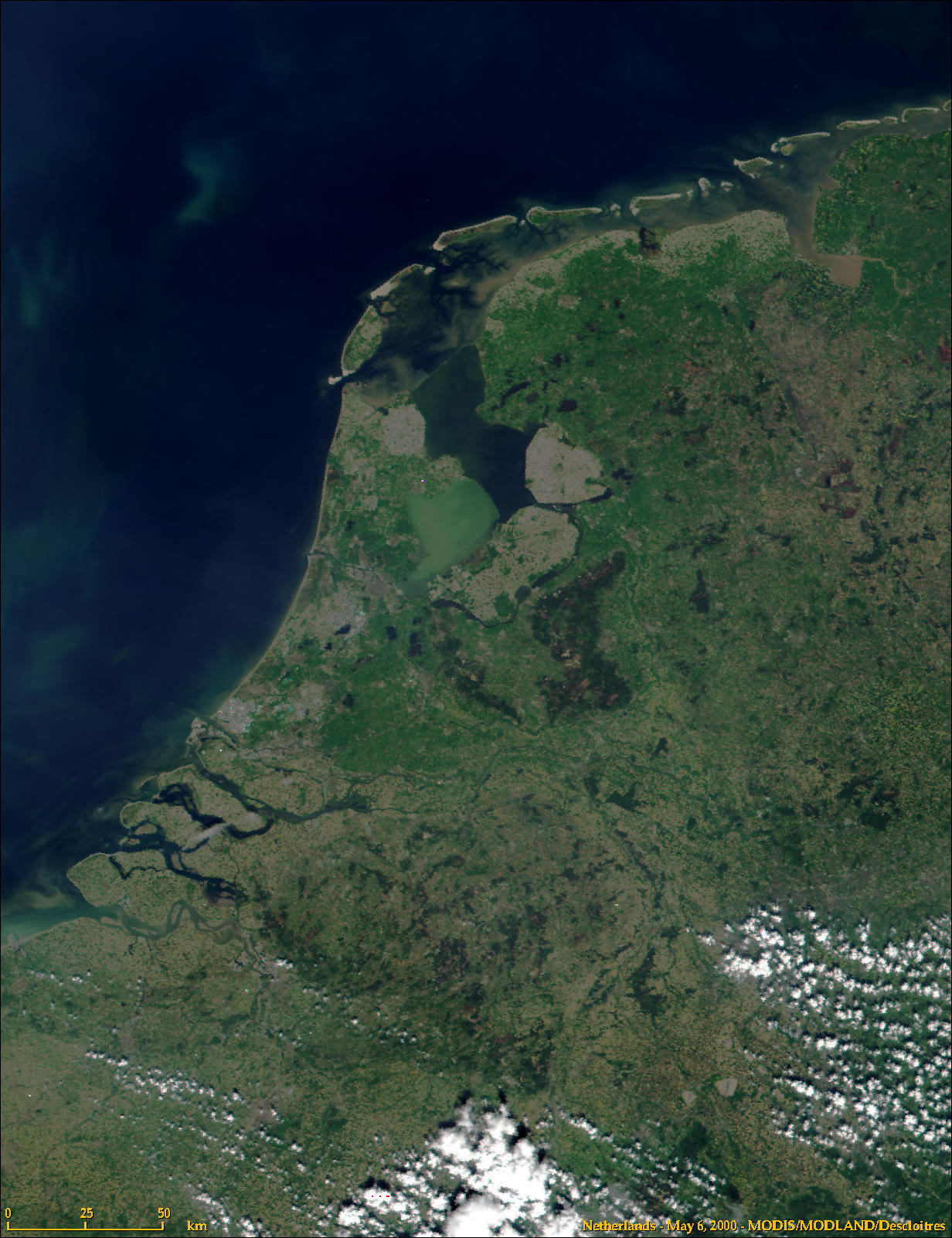
An enlargeable satellite image of the European Netherlands

Diagram of the organisation of entities in the Kingdom of the Netherlands

- Pronunciation: /ˈnɛðərləndz/ NEDH-ər-ləndz
- Common English country names: Netherlands, (imprecisely Holland)
- Official English country name: Netherlands
  - A constituent country of the Kingdom of the Netherlands, which comprises the Netherlands, Aruba, Curaçao and Sint Maarten.
- Common endonym(s): Nederland
  - Pronunciation: [ˈneːdərlɑnt]
- Official endonym(s): Nederland
- Adjectivals: Dutch, Netherlands
- Demonym(s): Dutch
- Etymology: Name of the Netherlands
- International rankings of the Netherlands
- ISO country codes: NL, NLD, 528
- ISO region codes: See ISO 3166-2:NL
- Internet country code top-level domain: .nl

== Geography of the Netherlands ==
Geography of the Netherlands

- The Netherlands is:
  - a country, part of the Kingdom of the Netherlands
  - a member state of the European Union
  - a member state of NATO
- Location (European Netherlands):
  - Northern Hemisphere and Eastern Hemisphere
  - Eurasia
    - Europe
      - Western Europe
  - Time zone: Central European Time (UTC+01), Central European Summer Time (UTC+02)
  - Extreme points of the Netherlands:
    - North: 53°33′18″N 6°28′41″E
    - East: 53°10′49″N 7°13′40″E
    - South: 50°45′01.5″N 5°54′54.0″E
    - West: 51°18′57″N 3°21′30″E
    - High: Vaalserberg 322 m (1,056 ft)
    - Low: Zuidplaspolder −6.7 m (−22 ft)
  - Land boundaries: 1,027 km

Germany 577 km
Belgium 450 km

- Coastline: North Sea 451 km

- Population of the Netherlands: 17,000,002
- Area of the Netherlands: 41,526 km^{2} / 16,033 sq mi
  - Water: 18.41%
- Atlas of the Netherlands

=== Environment of the Netherlands ===
Environment of the Netherlands

- Climate of the Netherlands
- Renewable energy in the Netherlands
- Geology of the Netherlands
- Protected areas of the Netherlands
  - Biosphere reserves in the Netherlands
  - National parks of the Netherlands
- Wildlife of the Netherlands
  - Fauna of the Netherlands
    - Birds of the Netherlands
    - Mammals of the Netherlands

==== Natural geographic features of the Netherlands ====
- Islands of the Netherlands
- Lakes of the Netherlands
- Rivers of the Netherlands
- World Heritage Sites in the Netherlands

=== Regions of the Netherlands ===
Regions of the Netherlands

==== Administrative divisions of the Netherlands ====
Administrative divisions of the Netherlands

- Provinces of the Netherlands
  - Municipalities of the Netherlands
- Capital of the Netherlands: Amsterdam, though the seat of government is in The Hague
- Cities of the Netherlands

=== Demography of the Netherlands ===
Demographics of the Netherlands

- Dutch people
- Ethnic minorities in the Netherlands

== Government and politics of the Netherlands ==
- Form of government: constitutional monarchy, democracy
- Capital of the Netherlands: Amsterdam. Note that the seat of government is in The Hague
- Elections in the Netherlands
  - European Parliament election, 2024
  - Dutch general election, 2023
  - Dutch Senate election, 2023
  - Dutch provincial elections, 2023
  - Dutch water board elections, 2023
  - Dutch municipal elections, 2022
- Political parties in the Netherlands
- Taxation in the Netherlands

=== Branches of government of the Netherlands ===
Government of the Netherlands

==== Executive branch of the government of the Netherlands ====
- Head of state: King of the Netherlands, Willem-Alexander of the Netherlands
- Head of government: Prime Minister of the Netherlands, Rob Jetten
- Cabinet of the Netherlands: List of cabinets of the Netherlands

==== Legislative branch of the government of the Netherlands ====
- Parliament of the Netherlands: States General (bicameral)
  - Upper house: Senate of the Netherlands
  - Lower house: House of Representatives of the Netherlands

==== Judicial branch of the government of the Netherlands ====
Judiciary of the Netherlands

- Supreme Court of the Netherlands

=== Foreign relations of the Netherlands ===
Foreign relations of the Netherlands

- Ministry of Foreign Affairs of the Netherlands
- Diplomatic missions in the Netherlands
- Diplomatic missions of the Netherlands

==== International organization membership of the Netherlands ====
International organization membership of the Netherlands

- Confederation of European Paper Industries (CEPI)
- World Veterans Federation

=== Economic Affairs and Finance of the Netherlands ===
- Ministry of Economic Affairs of the Netherlands
- Ministry of Finance of the Netherlands

=== Law and order in the Netherlands ===
Law of the Netherlands

- Ministry of Security and Justice of the Netherlands
- Capital punishment in the Netherlands
- Constitution of the Netherlands
- Human rights in the Netherlands
  - LGBT rights in the Netherlands
    - Same-sex marriage in the Netherlands
  - Religion in the Netherlands
  - Euthanasia in the Netherlands
  - Abortion in the Netherlands
  - Child labour in the Netherlands
- Law enforcement in the Netherlands
  - Prostitution in the Netherlands
  - Drug policy of the Netherlands
    - Gedogen (toleration of certain illegal practices for the greater good)

=== Military of the Netherlands ===
Military of the Netherlands

- Command
  - Commander-in-chief: the Government
  - Ministry of Defence of the Netherlands
  - Chief of the Netherlands Defence Staff
- Forces
  - Royal Netherlands Army
    - Korps Commandotroepen (special forces commando)
  - Royal Netherlands Navy
    - Netherlands Marine Corps (special forces marines)
  - Royal Netherlands Air Force
  - Royal Marechaussee (military police)
- Military history of the Netherlands
- Military ranks of the Dutch armed forces

=== Local government in the Netherlands ===
Politics in the Netherlands

- Provincial politics in the Netherlands
- Water board
- Municipal politics in the Netherlands

== History of the Netherlands ==
- Military history of the Netherlands

== Culture of the Netherlands ==
Culture of the Netherlands

- Architecture of the Netherlands
  - Dutch Baroque architecture
  - Dutch Colonial architecture
  - Dutch Colonial Revival architecture
- Cannabis in the Netherlands
- Cuisine of the Netherlands
- Ethnic minorities in the Netherlands
- Festivals in the Netherlands
  - Music festivals in the Netherlands (category)
  - Cabaret
- Languages of the Netherlands
- Media in the Netherlands
- National symbols of the Netherlands
  - Coat of arms of the Netherlands
  - Flag of the Netherlands
  - National anthem of the Netherlands
- Dutch people
- Prostitution in the Netherlands
- Public holidays in the Netherlands
- Records of the Netherlands
- Religion in the Netherlands
  - Buddhism in the Netherlands
  - Christianity in the Netherlands
  - Hinduism in the Netherlands
  - Islam in the Netherlands
  - Judaism in the Netherlands
  - Sikhism in the Netherlands
- World Heritage Sites in the Netherlands

=== Arts in the Netherlands ===
- Art in the Netherlands
- Cinema of the Netherlands
- Literature of the Netherlands
- Music of the Netherlands
- Television in the Netherlands
- Theatre in the Netherlands

=== Sports in the Netherlands ===
Sports in the Netherlands

- Football in the Netherlands

== Economy and infrastructure of the Netherlands ==
Economy of the Netherlands

- Economic rank, by nominal GDP (2007): 16th (sixteenth)
- Agriculture in the Netherlands
- Banking in the Netherlands
  - National Bank of the Netherlands
- Communications in the Netherlands
  - Internet in the Netherlands
- Companies of the Netherlands
- Currency of the Netherlands: Euro (see also: Euro topics)
  - ISO 4217: EUR
- Energy in the Netherlands
  - Energy policy of the Netherlands
  - Oil industry in the Netherlands
- Health care in the Netherlands
- Mining in the Netherlands
- Amsterdam Stock Exchange
  - AEX index
- Tourism in the Netherlands
- Transport in the Netherlands
  - Airports in the Netherlands
  - Cycling in the Netherlands
  - Rail transport in the Netherlands
  - Road transport in the Netherlands
  - Roads in the Netherlands
- Water supply and sanitation in the Netherlands

== Education in the Netherlands ==
Education in the Netherlands

== See also ==
Netherlands

- Index of Netherlands-related articles
- List of international rankings
- Member state of the European Union
- Member state of the North Atlantic Treaty Organization
- Member state of the United Nations
- Outline of Europe
- Outline of geography
