= List of music festivals in the Netherlands =

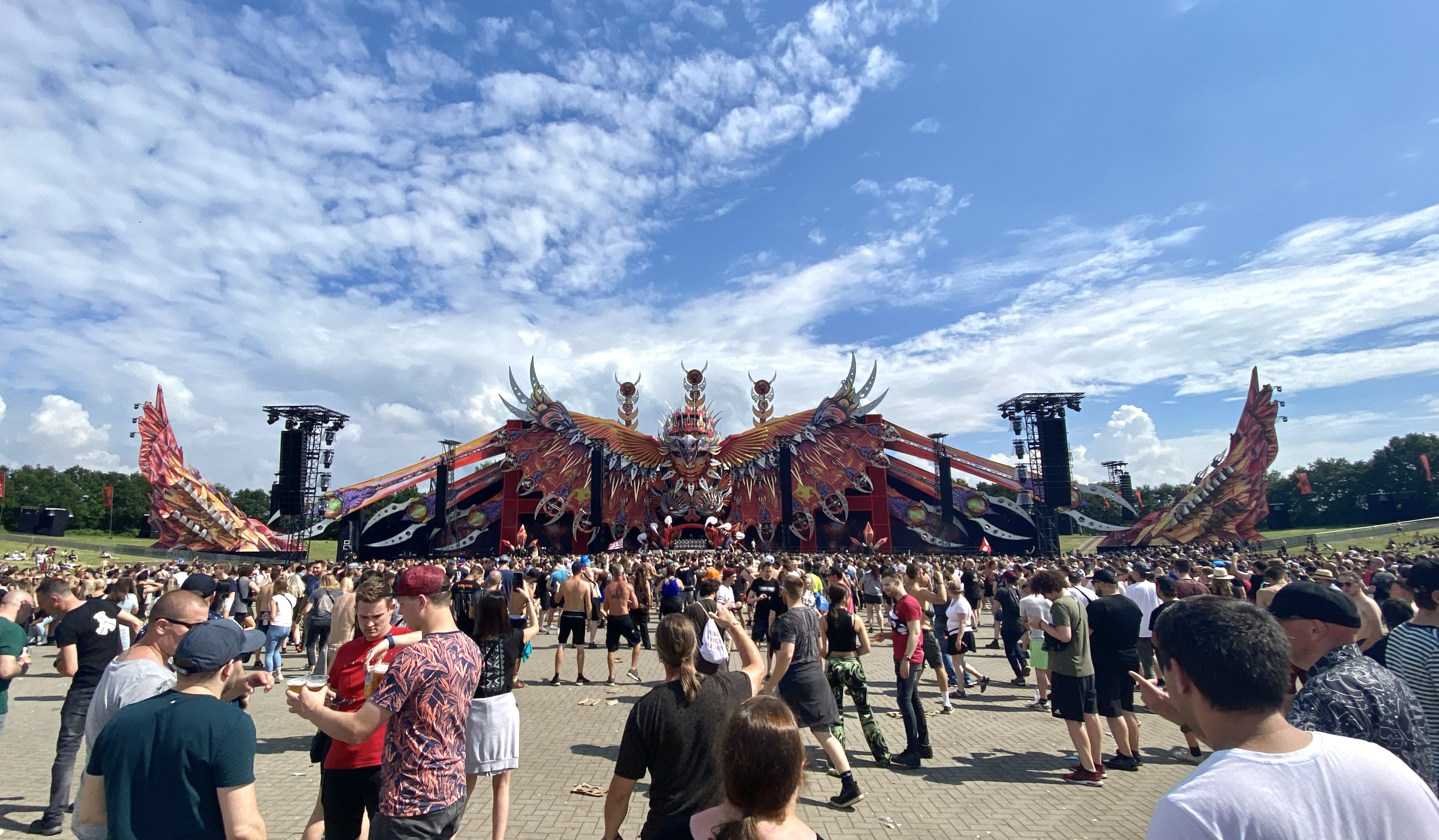
Defqon.1 Festival in 2022. One of the largest (harder styles) festivals in the Netherlands with over 100,000 unique visitors.

This is a list of music festivals in the Netherlands. It includes current and past notable festivals.

== Festival numbers and demographics ==
=== 2022 ===
In 2022, there were 10% more festivals and 4% more visitors than in 2019 before the COVID-19 pandemic started. A total of 19.2 million visitors in 2022. Because of the pandemic, the number of festivals fell from over 1,100 in 2019 to 155 in 2020 and rose to 343 in 2021. The festival sector dropped back to 1985 levels in 2020. With 1.4 million visits, 2020 is the worst festival year since measurements began.

=== 2024 ===
In 2024, in contrast to the expanding concert market, the festival market continued to face significant pressure. The total number of festivals decreased slightly by 2%, falling from 1,252 to 1,225, while overall festival attendance saw a 5% decline. Music festivals in particular experienced a downturn, with a 3.3% reduction in the number of events. The Electronic Dance Music (EDM) segment, despite its traditional popularity, recorded a sharp contraction, experiencing a 9% decline in the number of festivals and a 13.5% drop in attendance figures.

Sector anxieties heightened due to compounding financial strains. Key contributing factors included rising operational costs, declining sponsorship revenues, and a reduction in stabilizing government subsidies. Although the total number of canceled festivals decreased from 160 to 134, escalating costs were cited as a direct cause in approximately one-third of these cancellations. Conversely, despite the market downturn, nearly 50 new festivals or inaugural editions were introduced in 2024.

=== 2025 ===
Historically, major Dutch music festivals such as Lowlands and Down The Rabbit Hole routinely sold out within a short timeframe after ticket sales launched. However, recent trends indicate a slowdown in ticket velocity, with several major events failing to sell out immediately. Industry analysts attribute this shift primarily to rising ticket prices driven by broader economic inflation, which has forced consumers to be more selective in their festival attendance.

Despite the slower ticket sales, the overall volume of the festival market has remained relatively stable in 2025. The Netherlands hosted 1,228 large-scale festivals (defined as events attracting over 3,000 visitors). For 2026, the calendar remained largely consistent with 1,215 planned events. While the total number of festivals shows negligible decline, organizers have noted that market saturation and high pricing have reached a threshold, directly impacting consumer purchasing behavior for the first time.

The financial pressures facing the broader festival industry are also heavily pronounced within the harder dance styles segment (such as hardstyle and hardcore). Several prominent events within this scene have either permanently ceased operations, canceled planned editions, or entered a hiatus, primarily driven by escalating production costs and lower-than-expected ticket sales. Shockerz: The 2025 edition of the indoor raw hardstyle event Shockerz was canceled. In a statement to ticket holders, the organization noted that ticket sales failed to meet the threshold required to maintain production standards, leading to the decision to cancel rather than compromise on event quality.

Gearbox Outdoor and Trinity Outdoor, both outdoor events, were canceled prior to their scheduled dates due to prevailing market pressures.

=== 2026 ===
In 2026, the long-running harder styles event Ground Zero hosted its final edition, with organizers explicitly citing sharply increased operational costs as the primary reason for its discontinuation. The multi-genre electronic music festival Mysteryland, which features prominent harder styles stages, opted to skip a year in 2026 to navigate the challenging economic climate.

In June 2026, a severe heatwave in the Netherlands (the 2026 European heatwaves) led to the Royal Netherlands Meteorological Institute (KNMI) issuing a "code red" weather warning for multiple provinces. The extreme temperatures caused widespread disruption to the summer music festival season, resulting in several major cancellations and significant schedule adjustments. Local municipalities and safety regions enforced these measures due to concerns over public safety and to prevent placing further pressure on ambulance services, which were already severely strained by the heatwave.

Major events affected by the extreme weather included:

- Defqon.1 (Biddinghuizen): The prominent hardstyle festival was completely cancelled just before the weekend started, as organizers determined the safety of thousands of campers and day visitors could not be guaranteed.
- Spoorpark LIVE (Tilburg): The local municipality revoked the event's permit, forcing the cancellation of both the Friday and Saturday programs, which had scheduled performances by artists such as Anouk, Clouseau, and S10.
- I Love Urban (Rotterdam): The festival was cancelled last-minute after the municipality of Rotterdam revoked its event permit, despite the organization having prepared an extensive heat mitigation plan.
- Festival de Fusie (Leiden): The event scheduled at Park Matilo on 27 June was fully cancelled by the organizers due to irresponsible health risks.

Several other festivals avoided complete cancellation by enacting strict heat protocols, delaying their opening hours to late afternoon to avoid peak sun exposure, or moving parts of their daytime programming indoors. These included the TT Festival in Assen, Theaterfestival de Parade in Rotterdam, Luminosity Beach Festival in Zandvoort, Reuring Festival in Purmerend, and Festival 't Wonder in Woerden. Meanwhile, major events like Concert at SEA and Jera on Air were able to proceed as scheduled by implementing massive cooling measures, such as providing additional shade structures, mist cannons, and distributing free drinking water.

== List ==
Festival name	Type	Location	Year of first edition	Notes
Afrika Festival Hertme		Hertme	1989	
Appelpop		Tiel	1992	
Awakenings (festival)		Spaarnwoude, Hilvarenbeek	2001	Two festivals annually: during easter and summer
Best Kept Secret (festival)		Hilvarenbeek	2013	
Bospop		Weert	1981	
Castlefest		Lisse	2005	
Concert at SEA		Brouwersdam	2006	
Dance Valley		Spaarnwoude	1995	
Defqon.1		Biddinghuizen	2003	
Dekmantel	Techno	Amsterdam	2013	
Down the Rabbit Hole (festival)		Ewijk	2014	
Dutch Harp Festival		Utrecht	2010	
European World of Bluegrass		Voorthuizen	1998	
Into The Great Wide Open		Vlieland	2009	
Into the Grave (festival)		Oldehoofsterkerkhof	2011	
Liquicity Festival		Noord-Scharwoude	2015	
Lowlands (festival)		Biddinghuizen	1993	
Mysteryland		Vijfhuizen	1993	
North Sea Jazz Festival		Rotterdam	1976	
Pinkpop Festival		Landgraaf	1970	
Qlimax		Arnhem	2000	
Rotterdam Rave Festival		Rotterdam	2016	
Valkhof Festival (formerly known as "de-Affaire")		Nijmegen	1994	
Zwarte Cross		Oost Gelre	1997	
