= Awakenings (festival) =

Collection of techno parties and festivals in the Netherlands

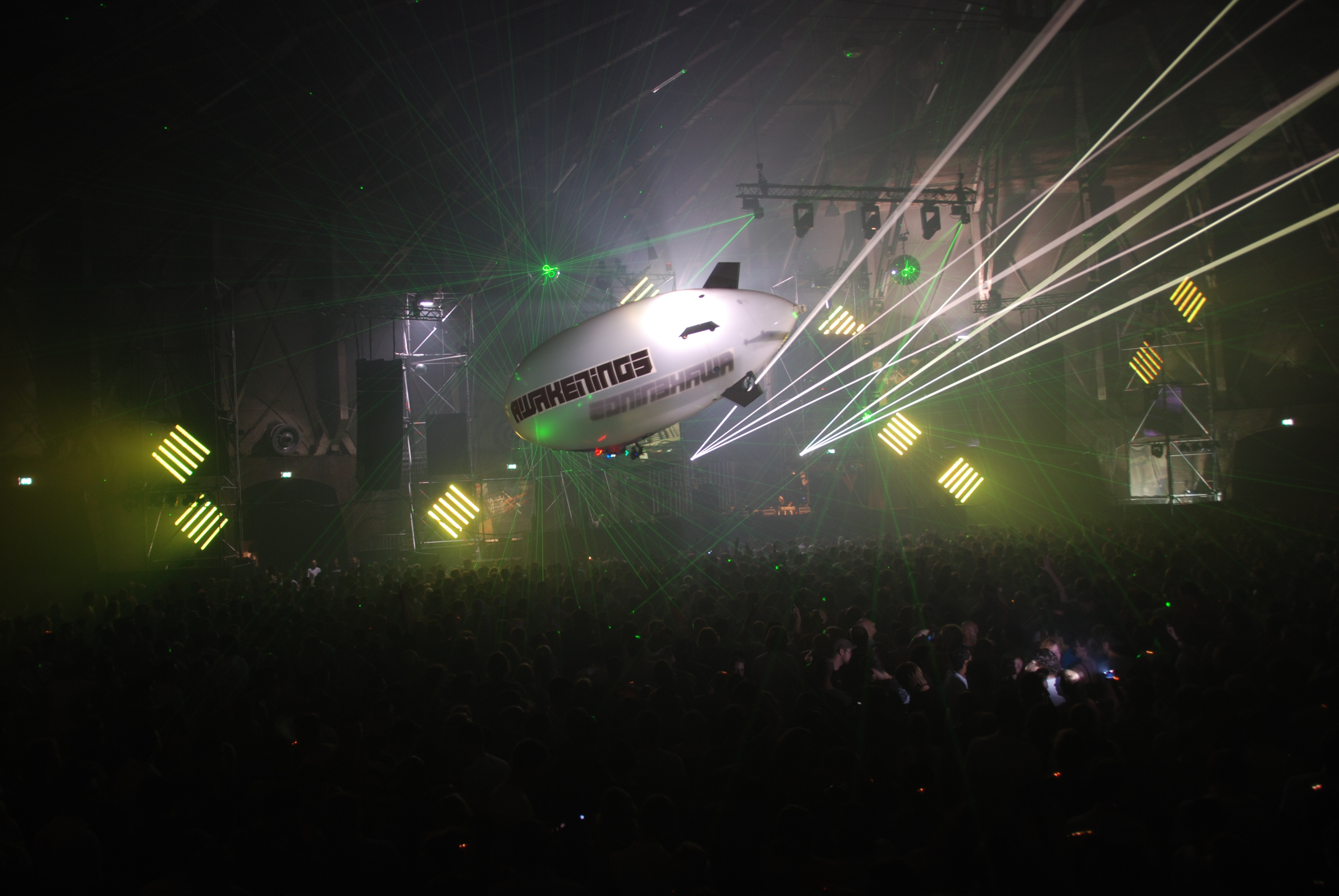
Gashouder Westergasfabriek

Awakenings is the collective name of techno parties and festivals that have been organized in the Netherlands since 1997 by events agency Monumental Productions BV. The current Awakenings Summer Festival is one of the biggest techno events in the world. The parties sometimes have a theme that has to do with techno music, such as minimal, Detroit, schranz, Drumcode or Kne'deep.

The venue used for indoor events is usually the Gashouder in Amsterdam, and the Spaarnwoude recreational area between Amsterdam and Haarlem for outdoor festivals.

The name Awakenings has to do with the resurrection of Jesus. The first party was around Easter and organizer Rocco Veenboer realized that he did not know what the Easter party meant. After he discovered that at Easter, among other things, the resurrection of Jesus is celebrated, the name Awakenings arose.

The cradle of Awakenings is located in the Gas holder of the Westergasfabriek, in the Westerpark in Amsterdam with its famous acoustics. There, the very first edition started on March 30, 1997 with the DJs Angelo, Billy Nasty, Derrick May, Dimitri, Godard, Nick Rapaccioli and Zen.

In 2000, the festival moved to the Now & Wow in Rotterdam because the Westergasfabriek was renovated. After that, the parties were held alternately in the Now & Wow and the NDSM in Amsterdam.

On February 18, 2005, the Westergasfabriek returned to use as a permanent location.

In October 2006, the Amsterdam police carried out checks at an Awakeningsfeest in the Gashouder in which 131 arrests were made. A second check at an Awakeningsfeest in November resulted in 82 arrests. The Awakeningsfeest at the NDSM wharf on December 31 was not granted a permit by the municipality due to a negative advice from the police and fire brigade. According to Awakenings organizer Rocco Veenboer, there was arbitrariness because similar parties at the same location were licensed. In a city council meeting on December 15, Mayor Job Cohen stated that on December 31, 2006, the police could not guarantee safety because too many hard drugs had been found in the last editions of Awakenings.

In 2008, the Klokgebouw in Eindhoven was the setting for the first time.

Since 2012, Awakenings has organized parties during Amsterdam Dance Event in Gashouder.

Foreign expansion followed in 2014 with editions in London, New York City, Manchester and Antwerp. In addition, events at other festivals were held in Australia, India, Brazil and in the United States.

In 2015, the organization behind Awakenings was taken over by SFX, now called LiveStyle.

In 2017, Awakenings' 20th anniversary was celebrated with the publication of the book Awakenings: 20 Years of Techno.

In 2020, due to the COVID-19 outbreak, Awakenings was organized as a free online event, with the DJ performances filmed at Gashouder and streamed live via social network channels.

== See also ==
- Rotterdam Rave
