= Environment of the Netherlands =

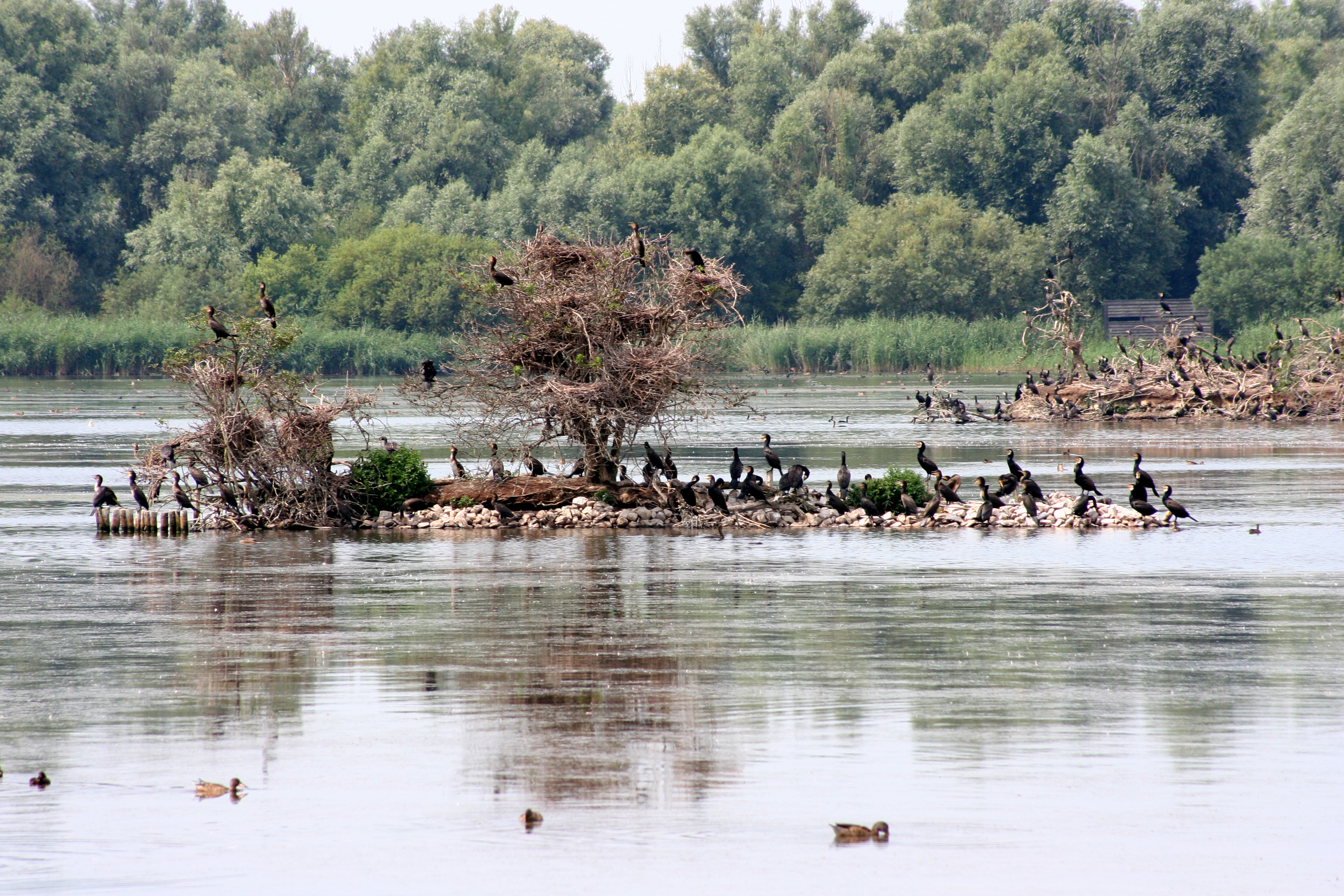
An island in the Lepelaarplassen

Environment of the Netherlands

The Netherlands had a 2018 Forest Landscape Integrity Index mean score of 0.6/10, ranking it 169th globally out of 172 countries.

== Biota ==
- List of birds of the Netherlands
- List of extinct animals of the Netherlands
- List of non-marine molluscs of the Netherlands

== See also ==
- European Commissioner for the Environment
- Environmental issue
- Bevrijdingsbos
- Dutch pollutant standards
- Geology of the Netherlands
- Litter in the Netherlands
- Ministry of Housing, Spatial Planning and the Environment
- Staatsbosbeheer
