= International rankings of the Netherlands =

These are the international rankings of the Netherlands.

== Economy ==
- International Monetary Fund: Income per capita in purchasing power parity ranked 9 out of 181 (2011)
- United Nations Development Programme: Human Development Index ranked 3 out of 169 (2011)
- World Economic Forum: Global Competitiveness Report ranked 5 out of 144 (2012–2013).
- World Economic Forum: Human Capital Report 2015 ranked 8 out of 124 (2015).
- European Innovation Scoreboard ranked 5th out of 36 (2017)
- World Intellectual Property Organization: Global Innovation Index 2026 ranked 7 out of 139 countries

== Military ==
- Institute for Economics and Peace: Global Peace Index ranked 14 out of 152 (2025)

== Politics ==
- RSF World Press Freedom Index ranked 6 out of 180 (2021)
- Fraser Institute: World Freedom Index ranked 2 out of 123 (2013)
- Transparency International: Corruption Perceptions Index ranked 9 out of 176 (2012)
- Reporters Without Borders: Press Freedom Index ranked 3 out of 178 (2011-2012)
- The Economist: Democracy Index ranked 10 out of 167 (2011)
- Fund For Peace: Failed States Index ranked 167 out of 177 (2012)
- United Nations: e-Government Readiness Index ranked 2 out of 190 (2012)

== Society ==
Main (reference) article: Society of the Netherlands

- OECD: Society at a Glance 2019. OECD Social Indicators ranked 5 out of 36 (2019)

== See also ==
- Communications in the Netherlands
- Education in the Netherlands
- Geography of the Netherlands
- Geology of the Netherlands
- Demographics of the Netherlands
- Government of the Netherlands
- Foreign relations of the Netherlands
- Law of the Netherlands
- Military of the Netherlands
