= List of mammals of the Netherlands =

This list shows the IUCN Red List status of the 77 mammal species occurring in the Netherlands. Two are endangered, two are vulnerable, and seven are near threatened.

Icons which state each species' global IUCN status:
CR	Critically Endangered	In imminent risk of extinction in the wild
EN	Endangered	Facing an extremely high risk of extinction in the wild
VU	Vulnerable	Facing a high risk of extinction in the wild
NT	Near Threatened	Doesn't meet any criteria that would categorise it as risking extinction but likely to in the future
LC	Least Concern	No current identifiable risks to this species
DD	Data Deficient	Inadequate information to make an assessment of the risks to this species

== Order: Rodentia (rodents) ==
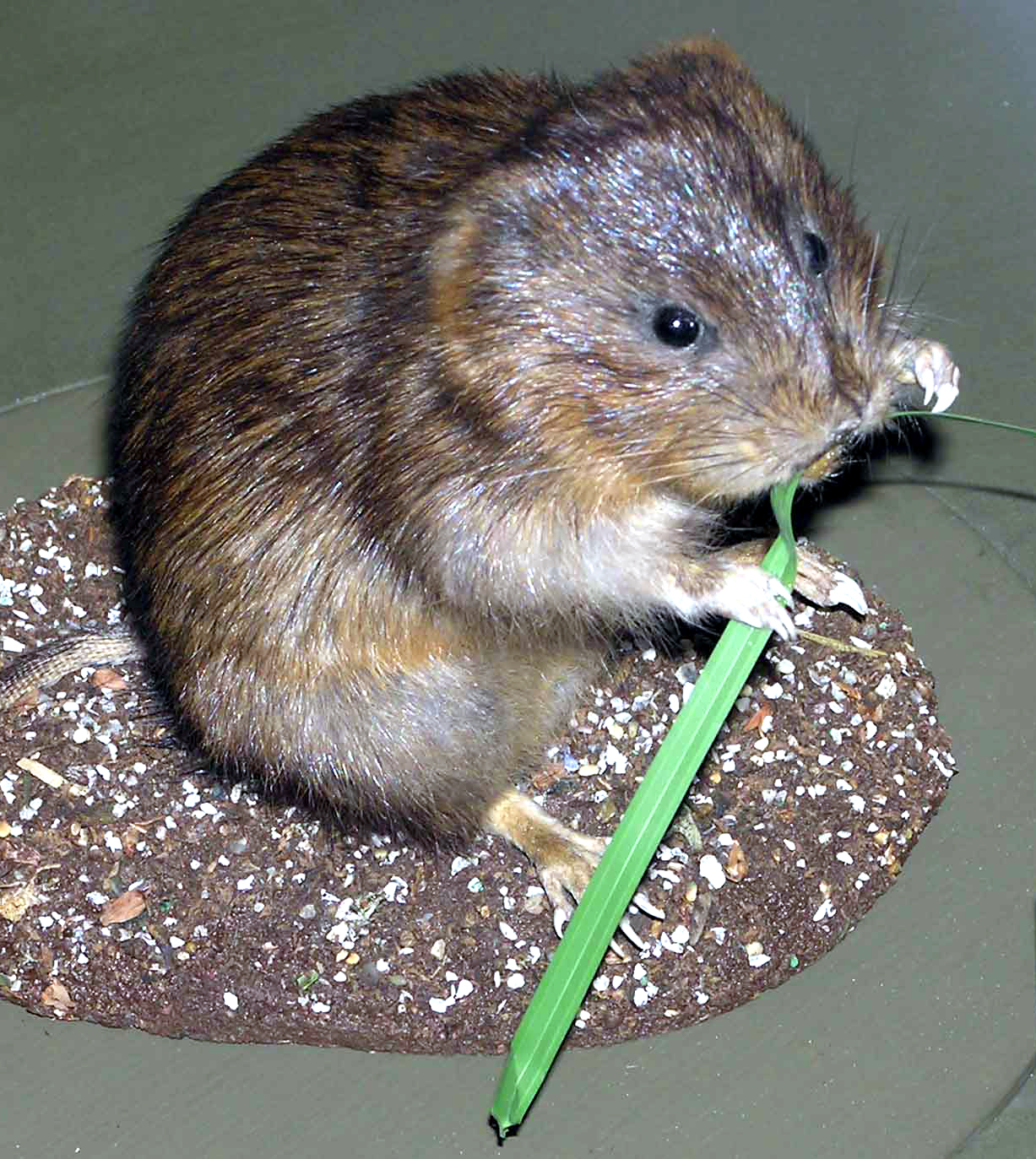
Water vole

Rodents make up the largest order of mammals, with over 40% of mammalian species. They have two incisors in the upper and lower jaw which grow continually and must be kept short by gnawing. Most rodents are small though the capybara can weigh up to 45 kg (99 lb).

- Suborder: Sciurognathi
  - Family: Castoridae (beavers)
    - Genus: Castor
      - Eurasian beaver, C. fiber LC
  - Family: Sciuridae (squirrels)
    - Subfamily: Sciurinae
      - Genus: Sciurus
        - Red squirrel, S. vulgaris LC
  - Family: Gliridae (dormice)
    - Subfamily: Leithiinae
      - Genus: Eliomys
        - Garden dormouse, E. quercinus NT
      - Genus: Muscardinus
        - Hazel dormouse, Muscardinus avellanarius LC
  - Family: Cricetidae
    - Subfamily: Cricetinae
      - Genus: Cricetus
        - European hamster, C. cricetus CR
    - Subfamily: Arvicolinae
      - Genus: Arvicola
        - European water vole, A. amphibius LC
        - Montane water vole, A. scherman LC
      - Genus: Clethrionomys
        - Bank vole, Myodes glareolus LC
      - Genus: Microtus
        - Field vole, Microtus agrestis LC
        - Common vole, Microtus arvalis LC
        - Tundra vole, Microtus oeconomus arenicola LC
        - European pine vole, Microtus subterraneus LC
  - Family: Muridae (mice, rats, voles, gerbils, hamsters)
    - Subfamily: Murinae
      - Genus: Apodemus
        - Yellow-necked mouse, Apodemus flavicollis LC
        - Wood mouse, Apodemus sylvaticus LC
      - Genus: Micromys
        - Eurasian harvest mouse, Micromys minutus LC
      - Genus: Mus
        - House mouse, M. musculus LC
      - Genus: Rattus
        - Brown rat, R. norvegicus LC
        - Black rat, R. rattus LC

== Order: Lagomorpha (lagomorphs) ==
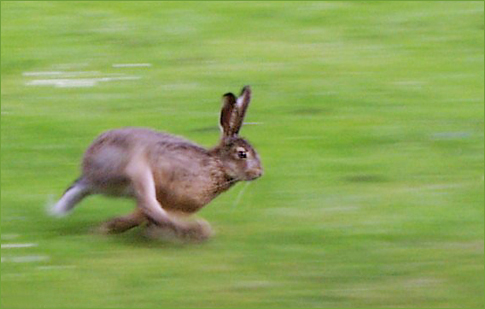
European hare

The lagomorphs comprise two families, Leporidae (hares and rabbits), and Ochotonidae (pikas). Though they can resemble rodents, and were classified as a superfamily in that order until the early twentieth century, they have since been considered a separate order. They differ from rodents in a number of physical characteristics, such as having four incisors in the upper jaw rather than two.

  - Genus: Lepus
    - European hare, L. europaeus LC
- Family: Leporidae (rabbits, hares)
  - Genus: Oryctolagus
    - European rabbit, O. cuniculus EN introduced

== Order: Eulipotyphla (shrews, hedgehogs and moles) ==
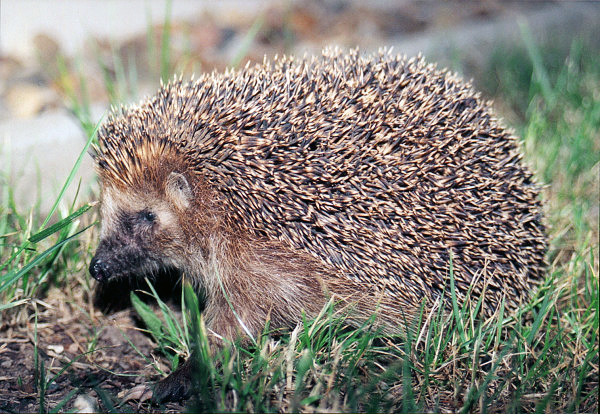
West European hedgehog

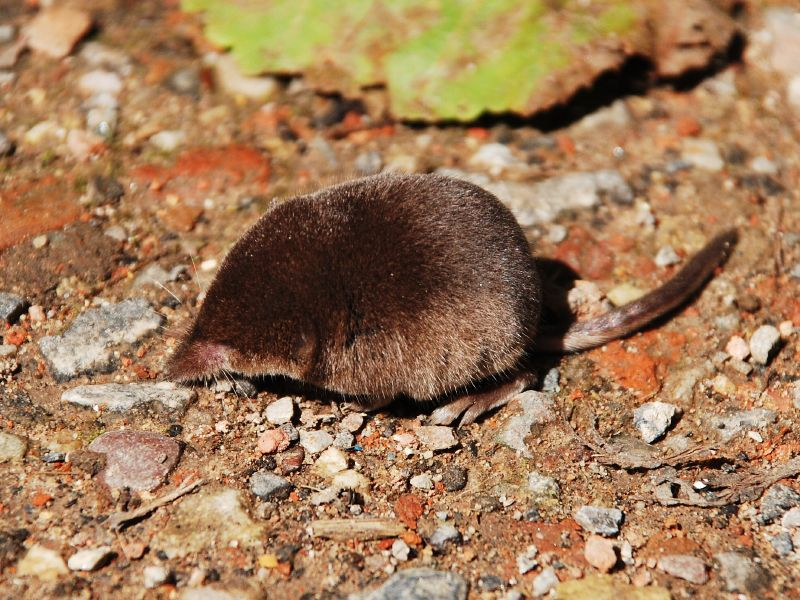
Eurasian pygmy shrew

Eulipotyphlans are insectivorous mammals. Shrews and solenodons resemble mice, hedgehogs carry spines, gymnures look more like large rats, while moles are stout-bodied burrowers.

- Family: Erinaceidae (hedgehogs)
  - Subfamily: Erinaceinae
    - Genus: Erinaceus
      - West European hedgehog, E. europaeus LC
- Family: Soricidae (shrews)
  - Subfamily: Crocidurinae
    - Genus: Crocidura
      - Bicolored shrew, C. leucodon LC
      - Greater white-toothed shrew, C. russula LC
  - Subfamily: Soricinae
    - Tribe: Nectogalini
      - Genus: Neomys
        - Eurasian water shrew, Neomys fodiens LC
    - Tribe: Soricini
      - Genus: Sorex
        - Common shrew, Sorex araneus LC
        - Crowned shrew, Sorex coronatus LC
        - Eurasian pygmy shrew, Sorex minutus LC
- Family: Talpidae (moles)
  - Subfamily: Talpinae
    - Tribe: Talpini
      - Genus: Talpa
        - European mole, Talpa europaea LC

== Order: Chiroptera (bats) ==
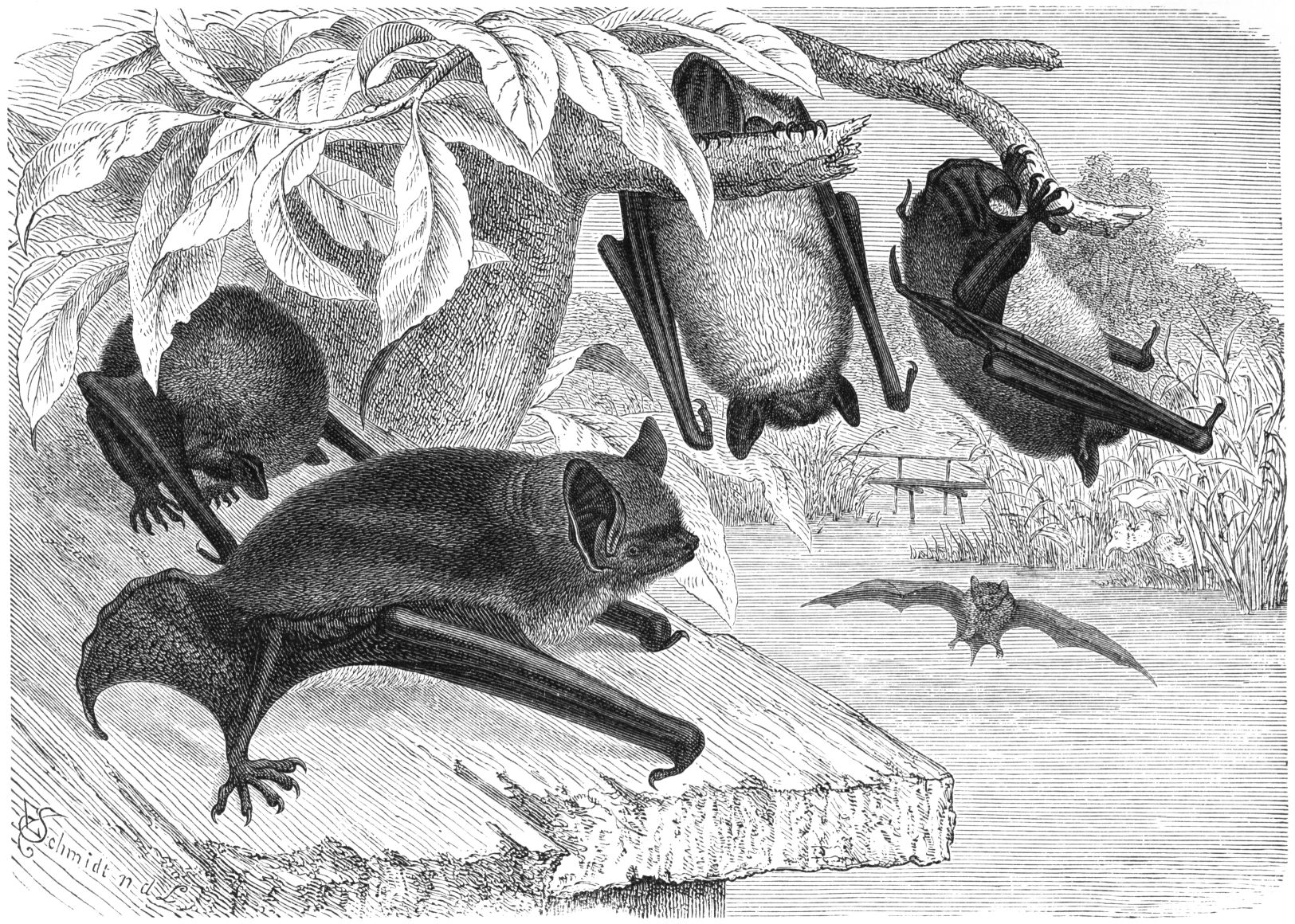
Daubenton's bat

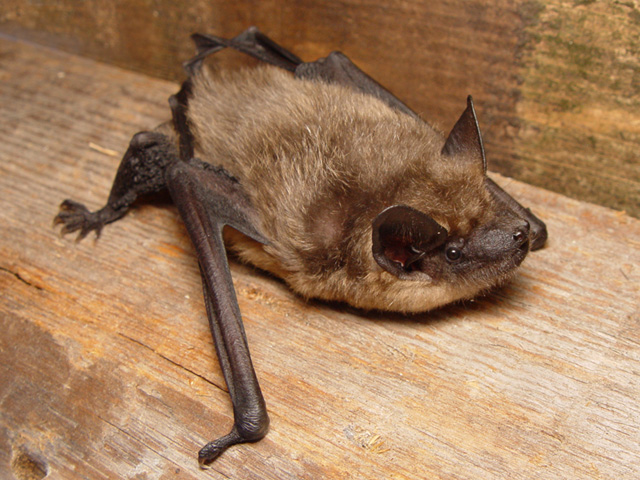
Serotine bat

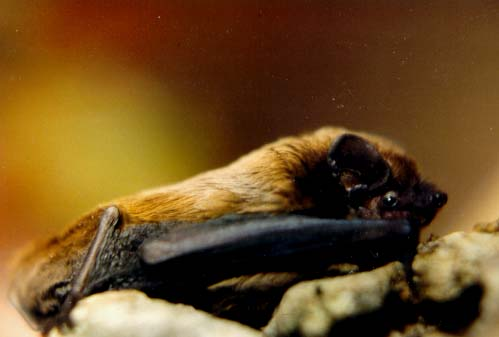
Lesser noctule

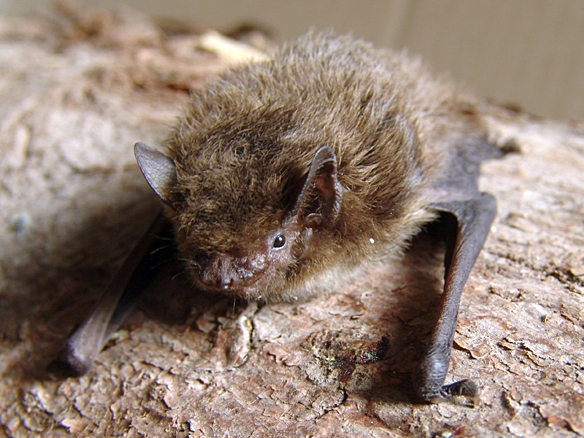
Nathusius' pipistrelle

The bats' most distinguishing feature is that their forelimbs are developed as wings, making them the only mammals capable of flight. Bat species account for about 20% of all mammals.

- Family: Vespertilionidae
  - Subfamily: Myotinae
    - Genus: Myotis
      - Bechstein's bat, M. bechsteini NT
      - Brandt's bat, M. brandti LC
      - Pond bat, M. dasycneme NT
      - Daubenton's bat, M. daubentonii LC
      - Geoffroy's bat, M. emarginatus LC
      - Greater mouse-eared bat, M. myotis LC
      - Whiskered bat, M. mystacinus LC
      - Natterer's bat, M. nattereri LC
  - Subfamily: Vespertilioninae
    - Genus: Barbastella
      - Western barbastelle, B. barbastellus NT
    - Genus: Eptesicus
      - Northern bat, E. nilssonii LC
      - Serotine bat, E. serotinus LC
    - Genus: Nyctalus
      - Common noctule, N. noctula LC
      - Lesser noctule, N. leisleri LC
    - Genus: Pipistrellus
      - Nathusius' pipistrelle, P. nathusii LC
      - Common pipistrelle, P. pipistrellus LC
      - Soprano pipistrelle, P. pygmaeus LC
    - Genus: Plecotus
      - Brown long-eared bat, P. auritus LC
      - Grey long-eared bat, P. austriacus LC
    - Genus: Vespertilio
      - Parti-coloured bat, V. murinus LC

== Order: Cetacea (whales) ==
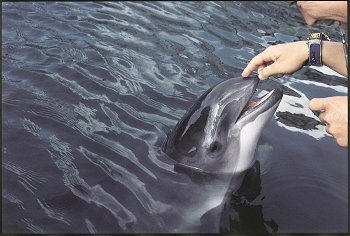
Harbour porpoise

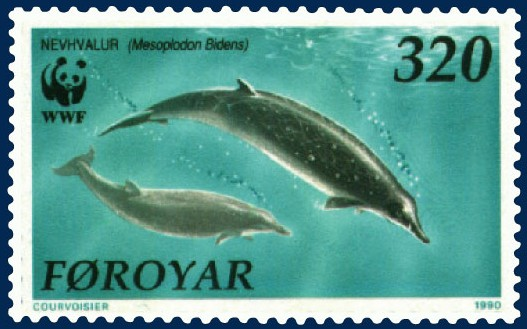
Sowerby's beaked whale

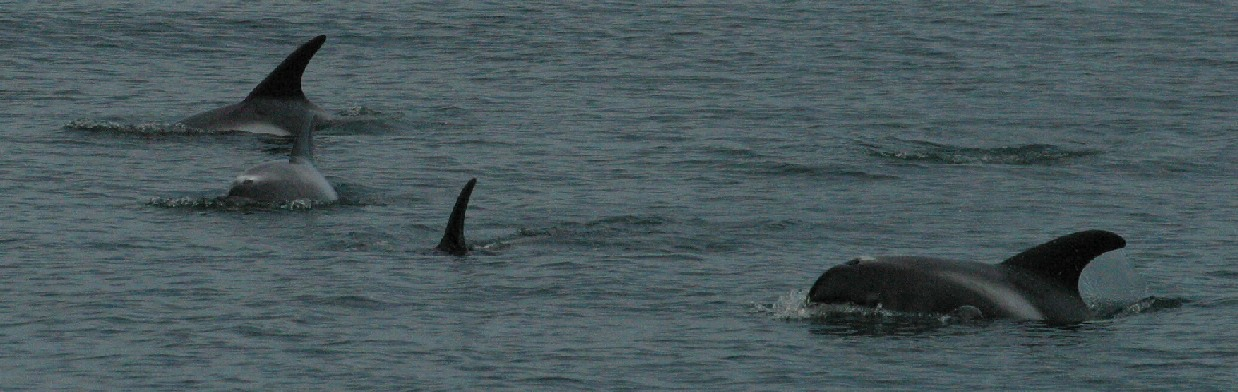
White-beaked dolphin

The order Cetacea includes whales, dolphins and porpoises. They are the mammals most fully adapted to aquatic life with a spindle-shaped nearly hairless body, protected by a thick layer of blubber, and forelimbs and tail modified to provide propulsion underwater.

- Suborder: Mysticeti
  - Family: Balaenidae
    - Genus: Balaena
      - Bowhead whale, Balaena mysticetus LC (vagrant)
    - Genus: Eubalaena
      - North Atlantic right whale, Eubalaena glacialis EN (functionally extinct in north eastern Atlantic, a possible right whale was sighted off Texel and Schouwen-Duiveland in 2005.)
  - Family: Balaenopteridae
    - Subfamily: Balaenopterinae
      - Genus: Balaenoptera
        - Minke whale, Balaenoptera acutorostrata LC
        - Sei whale, Balaenoptera borealis EN
        - Fin whale, Balaenoptera physalus EN
      - Genus: Megaptera
        - Humpback whale, Megaptera novaeangliae LC
- Suborder: Odontoceti
  - Superfamily: Platanistoidea
    - Family: Monodontidae
      - Genus: Monodon
        - Narwhal, Monodon monoceros NT
      - Genus: Delphinapterus
        - Beluga, Delphinapterus leucas LC vagrant
    - Family: Phocoenidae
      - Genus: Phocoena
        - Harbour porpoise, Phocoena phocoena LC
    - Family: Physeteridae
      - Genus: Physeter
        - Sperm whale, Physeter macrocephalus VU
    - Family: Kogiidae
      - Genus: Kogia
        - Pygmy sperm whale, K. breviceps DD
    - Family: Ziphidae
      - Subfamily: Hyperoodontinae
        - Genus: Hyperoodon
          - Northern bottlenose whale, Hyperoodon ampullatus DD
        - Genus: Mesoplodon
          - Sowerby's beaked whale, Mesoplodon bidens DD
          - Blainville's beaked whale, Mesoplodon densirostris DD
          - Gray's beaked whale, Mesoplodon grayi DD
      - Subfamily: Ziphiinae
        - Genus: Ziphius
          - Cuvier's beaked whale, Ziphius cavirostris LC
    - Family: Delphinidae (marine dolphins)
      - Genus: Lagenorhynchus
        - White-beaked dolphin, Lagenorhynchus albirostris LC
      - Genus: Leucopleurus
        - Atlantic white-sided dolphin, Leucopleurus acutus LC
      - Genus: Tursiops
        - Bottlenose dolphin, Tursiops truncatus LC
      - Genus: Stenella
        - Striped dolphin, Stenella coeruleoalba LC
      - Genus: Delphinus
        - Short-beaked common dolphin, Delphinus delphis LC
      - Genus: Grampus
        - Risso's dolphin, Grampus griseus LC
      - Genus: Globicephala
        - Long-finned pilot whale, Globicephala melas DD
      - Genus: Orcinus
        - Orca, O. orca DD

== Order: Carnivora (carnivorans) ==
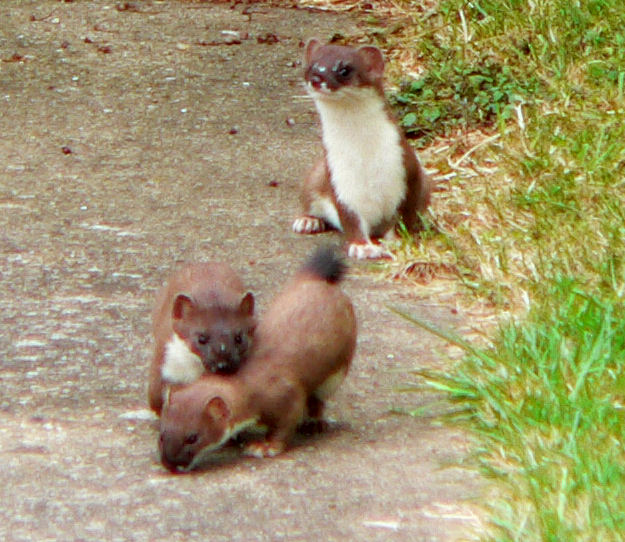
Stoat

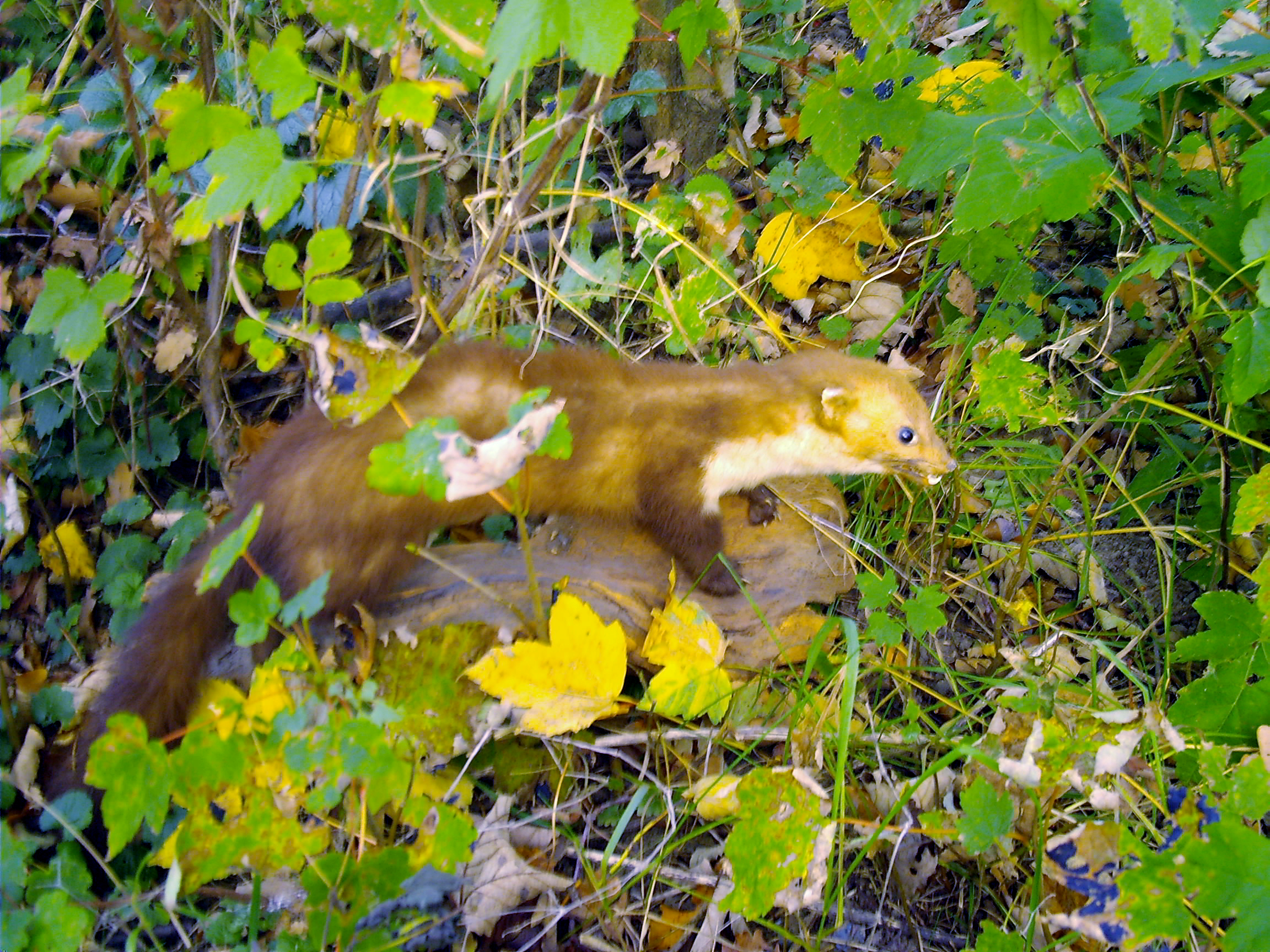
Beech marten

There are over 260 species of carnivorans, the majority of which feed primarily on meat. They have a characteristic skull shape and dentition.

- Suborder: Feliformia
  - Family: Felidae (cats)
    - Subfamily: Felinae
      - Genus: Felis
        - European wildcat, F. silvestris LC
  - Family: Viverridae
    - Subfamily: Viverrinae
      - Genus: Genetta
        - Common genet, G. genetta LC introduced, presence uncertain
- Suborder: Caniformia
  - Family: Canidae (dogs, foxes)
    - Genus: Canis
      - Gray wolf, C. lupus LC
    - Genus: Vulpes
      - Red fox, V. vulpes LC
  - Family: Mustelidae (mustelids)
    - Genus: Lutra
      - European otter, L. lutra NT
    - Genus: Martes
      - Beech marten, M. foina LC
      - European pine marten, M. martes LC
    - Genus: Meles
      - European badger, M. meles LC
    - Genus: Mustela
      - Stoat, M. erminea LC
      - European mink, M. lutreola CR
      - Least weasel, M. nivalis LC
      - European polecat, M. putorius LC
    - Genus: Neogale
      - American mink, N. vison LC presence uncertain, introduced
  - Family: Phocidae (earless seals)
    - Genus: Cystophora
      - Hooded seal, Cystophora cristata VU
    - Genus: Halichoerus
      - Grey seal, Halichoerus grypus LC
    - Genus: Pagophilus
      - Harp seal, Pagophilus groenlandicus LC
    - Genus: Phoca
      - Common seal, Phoca vitulina LC
    - Genus: Pusa
      - Ringed seal, Pusa hispida LC

== Order: Artiodactyla (even-toed ungulates) ==
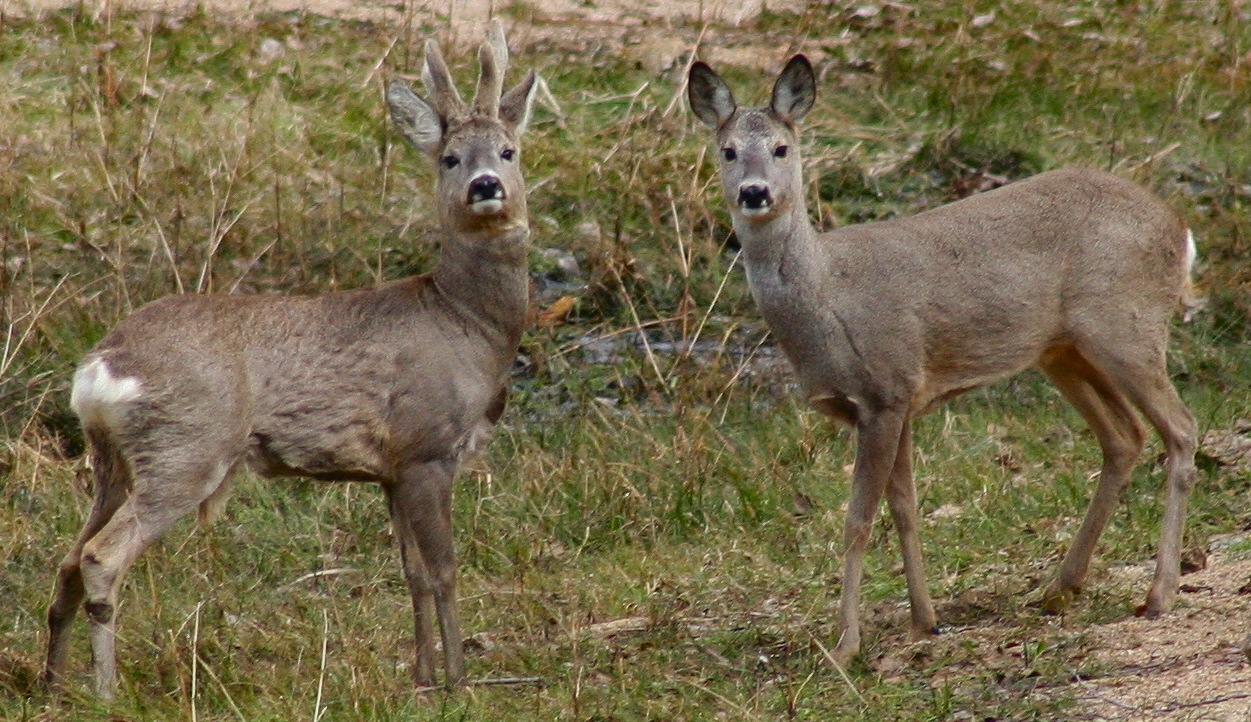
Roe deer

The even-toed ungulates are ungulates whose weight is borne about equally by the third and fourth toes, rather than mostly or entirely by the third as in perissodactyls. There are about 220 artiodactyl species, including many that are of great economic importance to humans.

- Family: Cervidae (deer)
  - Subfamily: Cervinae
    - Genus: Cervus
      - Red deer, C. elaphus LC
    - Genus: Dama
      - European fallow deer, D. dama LC introduced
  - Subfamily: Capreolinae
    - Genus: Capreolus
      - Roe deer, C. capreolus LC
- Family: Suidae (pigs)
  - Subfamily: Suinae
    - Genus: Sus
      - Wild boar, S. scrofa LC

== Locally extinct ==
The following species are locally extinct in the country:

- European bison, Bison bonasus
- European wildcat, Felis silvestris
- Greater horseshoe bat, Rhinolophus ferrumequinum
- Lesser horseshoe bat, Rhinolophus hipposideros
- Brown bear, Ursus arctos
- Moose, Alces alces

== See also ==
- List of chordate orders
- Lists of mammals by region
- List of prehistoric mammals
- Mammal classification
- List of mammals described in the 2000s
