= Gedogen =

Dutch law term

In the context of the law of the Netherlands, the term gedogen (Dutch pronunciation: [ɣəˈdoːɣə(n)]; 'toleration', although not literally) refers to not enforcing certain laws. The Dutch government tolerates some offences. Some things like possessing small amounts of cannabis are formally forbidden by law, but the Dutch government abstains from bringing criminal charges against the offenders. Often these policies are brought about by a tension between treaty obligations and domestic politics. See policies on cannabis and euthanasia for more information.

To give an example in layman's terms: a parent may tell their child they cannot have cookies from the cookie jar. The grandparent, regardless of their beliefs, cannot tell the child it is okay to have a cookie as that would result in a conflict with the parent. If the grandparent sees the child taking a cookie anyway, they may choose not to say anything. They may not want to punish or stop the child, but cannot condone the behavior either. The grandparent may act as if nothing had happened to avoid a conflict with both their beliefs and the parent. They tolerate (Dutch "gedoogt") the behavior.

The statutes describe it as "The basis for the 'gedoog' policy is the consideration of interests in which the interest of law enforcement needs to yield to an identifiable greater cause. It is a positive decision not to pursue and prosecute regardless of available law enforcement capacity."
