= Sikhism in the Netherlands =

Sikhism in Netherlands Sikhisme in Nederland

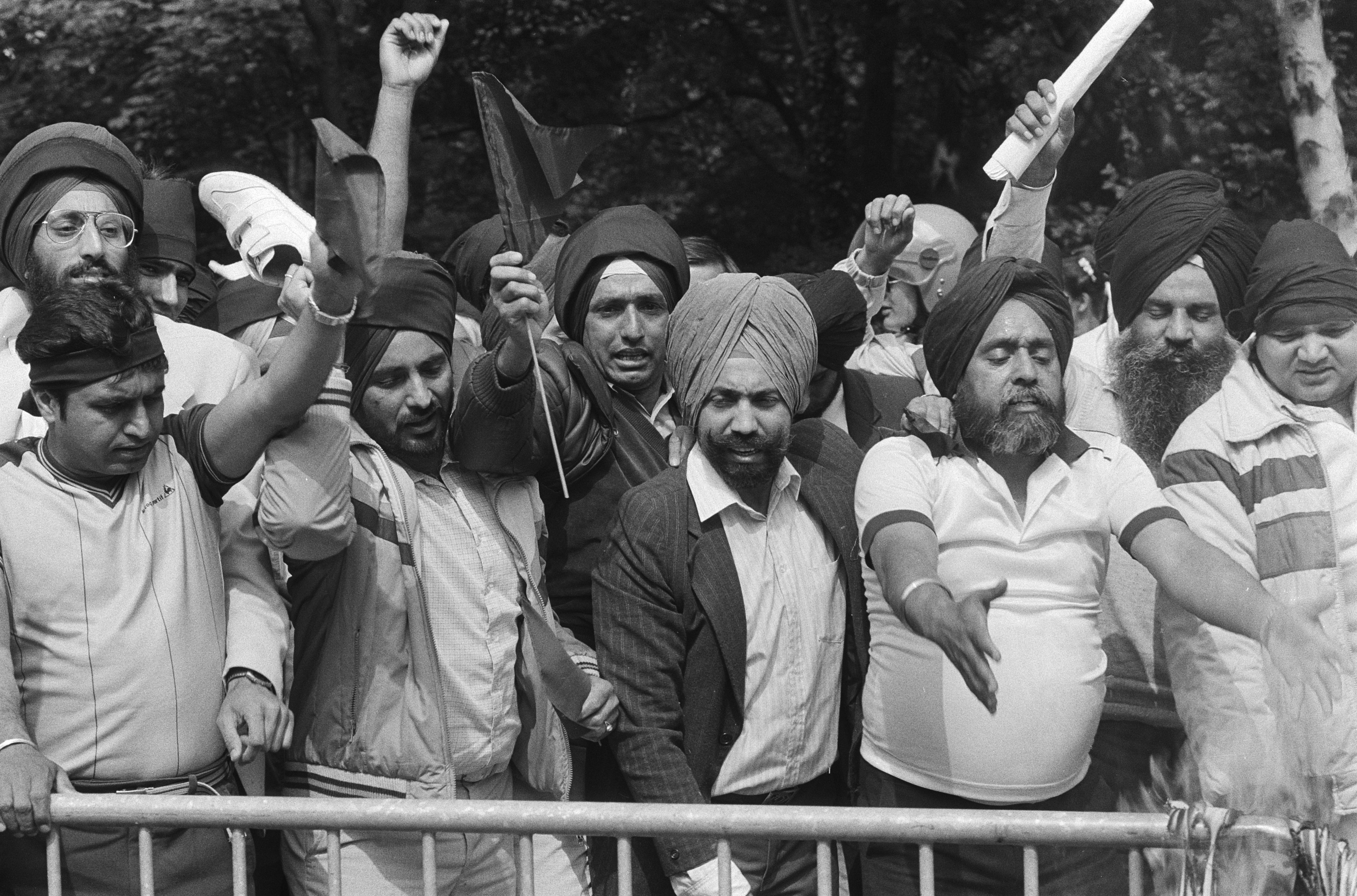
- Dutch Sikhs protesting at the International Court of Justice in The Hague, Netherlands as a response to Operation Blue Star (Circa June 1984)

Total population
- 15,000

Regions with significant populations
- Amsterdam · Rotterdam · The Hague

Religions
- Sikhism

Languages
- Punjabi · Dutch

Dutch Sikhs form a religious minority in the Netherlands. They number around 15,000 and most of them live in or around Amsterdam. There are nine gurudwaras in the Netherlands.

== Gurdwaras ==
- Gurdwara Maan Sarovar Sahib, Amsterdam
- Guru Ram Das Ashram, Amsterdam
- Sri Guru Nanak Gurdwara, Amsterdam
- Gurdwara Guru Nanak Darbar, Beverwijk
- Gurdwara Guru Maneyo Granth a.k.a. Gurdwara Eindhoven, Eindhoven
- Singh Sabha Holland, Rotterdam
- Gurdwara Shri Nanak Dev Ji, Rotterdam
- Shri Guru Ravidass Temple, The Hague
- Sikh vereniging Sri Guru Singh Sabha, The Hague
- Gurdwara Sikh Sangat Sahib, Almere Haven

== List of Sikhs from Netherlands ==
- Vikramjit Singh – Netherlands International Cricketer
