= Rotterdam Rave =

Music festival in the Netherlands

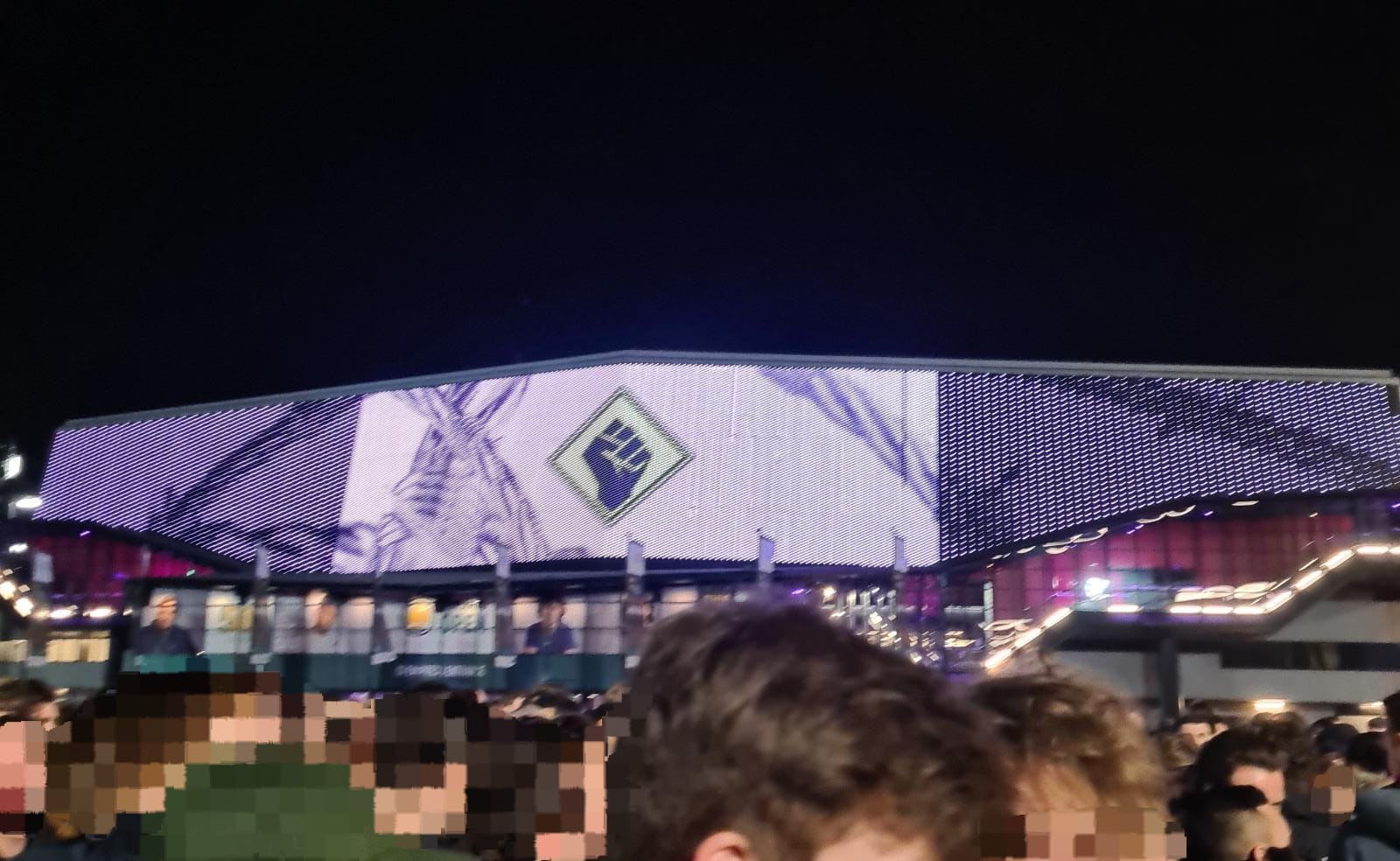
- The iconic Rotterdam Rave logo showing a clenched fist on the Ahoy venue.
- Locations: Maassilo, RDM Grounds, Ahoy Rotterdam
- Years active: 2013–present
- Founders: Karim Soliman
- Attendance: 50,000+ (per year, all events)
- Website: Official website Official festival website

Rotterdam Rave is the collective name of techno parties and festivals that have been organized in Rotterdam, the Netherlands since 2012 by the company with the same name. Rotterdam Rave has grown as one of the biggest hosts in techno events in the Netherlands.

== History ==
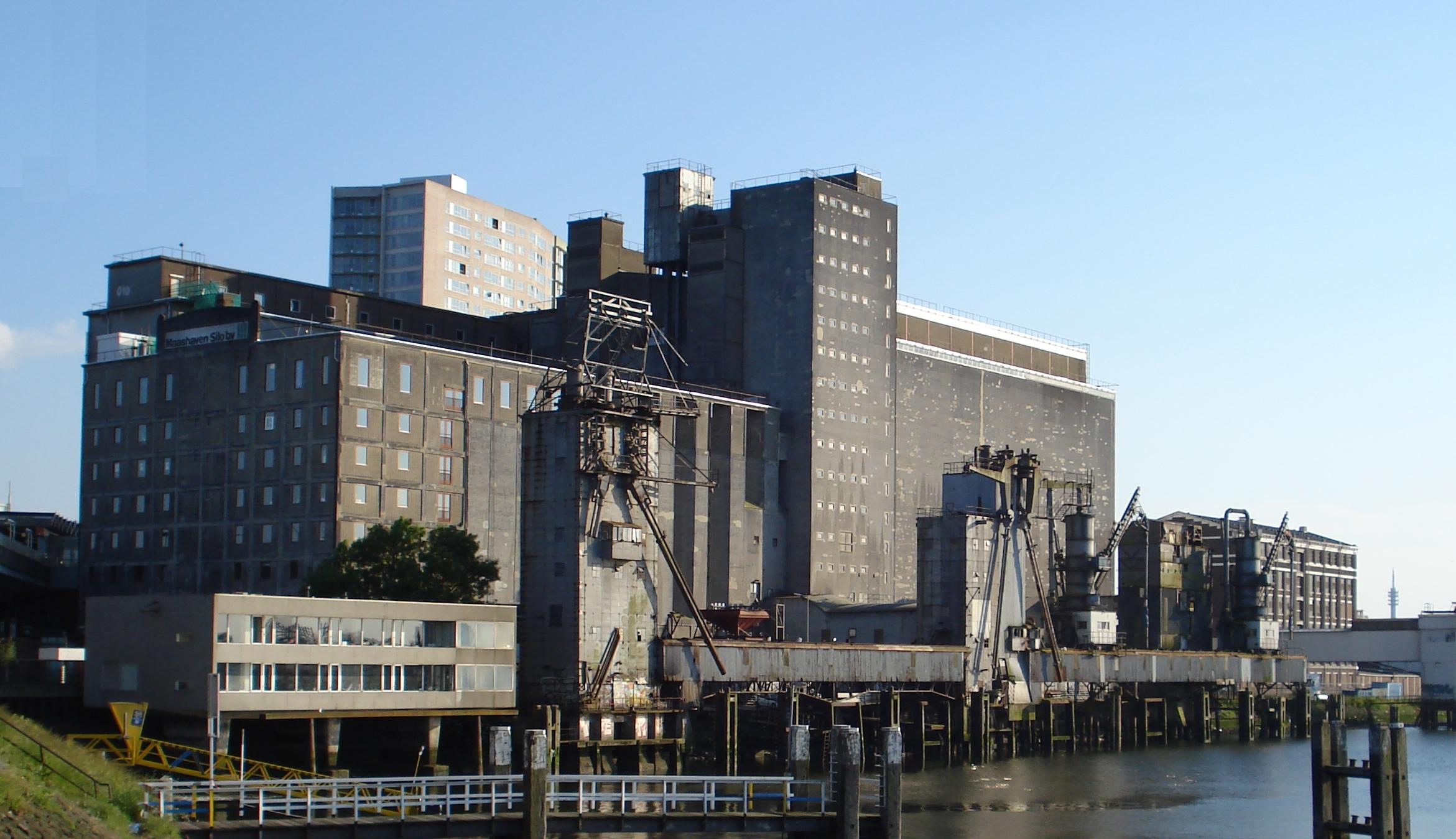
The Maassilo is a former silo and grain elevator, used as an event location since 2004.

The concept was founded by Karim Soliman, who wanted to change the Rotterdam techno culture and with the goal of making Rotterdam internationally famous for its techno scene. It started with illegal raves in the Kralingse bos. After that, he wanted to organize a real rave, but with the same atmosphere. The first edition was hosted in 2012 in Perron, a small but popular club in Rotterdam, with about 1,000 visitors. After this edition, the raves moved to Factory 010 (now known as Now&Wow), but this was also too small for the concept that got increasingly popular. Most parties are now hosted in the Maassilo. In 2016, Rotterdam Rave hosted the Rotterdam Rave Festival for the first time, on the Lloyd Multiplein in Rotterdam. In 2019, the Rotterdam Rave Festival location moved from the Lloyd Multiplein to the RDM grounds in Rotterdam, a long-time wish of the organisation because of the raw feeling with the port, warehouses, and the overall industrial port terrain. In 2023, Rotterdam Rave hosted a rave at the new RTM Stage of Rotterdam Ahoy for the first time.

== Rotterdam Rave Festival ==
Edition	Year	Date	Lineup	Location	Reference
1st	2016	6 August	and [live]; de sluwe vos; DJ Deeon; egbert [live]hunee; jeremy underground; joey daniel; karenn [live]; karim soliman; luigi madonna; modular djs; ohana hana; perc & trussrobert hoodrod; sidney charles; stranger; surgeon [live]; the advent vs industrialyzer; tommy four seven; wouter s.	Lloyd Multiplein, Rotterdam	
2nd	2017	19 August	jeff mills; len faki; nicole moudaber; speedy j [3hr set]; anotr; benny rodrigues; cristian viviano; de sluwe vos; gary beck; joey daniel; karim soliman; luigi madonna; michel de hey; paula temple hybrid live; perc & ansome hybrid live; rowen clark; snts; stranger; wouter s	Lloyd Multiplein, Rotterdam	
3rd	2018	18 August	nina kraviz [3hr set]; speedy j [3hr set]; and live; anotr; ben buitendijk; boris ross; dax j; deniro; headstrong (randomer & clouds); karim soliman; michel de hey; benny rodrigues; mpia3; paula temple; rebekah; remco beekwilder; rowen clark; stranger (old school classic set)	Lloyd Multiplein, Rotterdam	
4th	2019	17 August	ben klock; cynthia spiering; daniele travali; dax j; fjaak (live); ghost in the machine; i hate models; jorn luka; joyhauser; karim soliman; rowen clark; kobosil; michel de hey; paula temple; perc (live); rod; reinier zonneveld (live); remco beekwilder; secret cinema; stranger	RDM-Grounds, Rotterdam	
Cancelled	2020	15 August	999999999; Anfisa Letyago; cynthia spiering; dax j; dyen; imogen; inhalten der nacht; kobosil; onyvaa; paula temple hybrid live; rebekah; rod; stranger	RDM-Grounds, Rotterdam	
6th	2021	14 August	amotik; anfisa letyago; charlotte de witte; cynthia spiering; dax j; dyen; imogen; inhalten der nacht; kobosil; onyvaa; paula temple hybrid live; rebekah; stranger; rod; 999999999	RDM-Grounds, Rotterdam	
7th	2022	13 August	999999999; anfisa letyago; anna; cera khin; charlie sparks; cynthia spiering; diøn; dyen; i hate models; imogen; klangkuenstler b2b nico moreno; kobosil; paula temple b2b snts; stranger; trym b2b shlømo	RDM-Grounds, Rotterdam	
