= Child labour in the Netherlands =

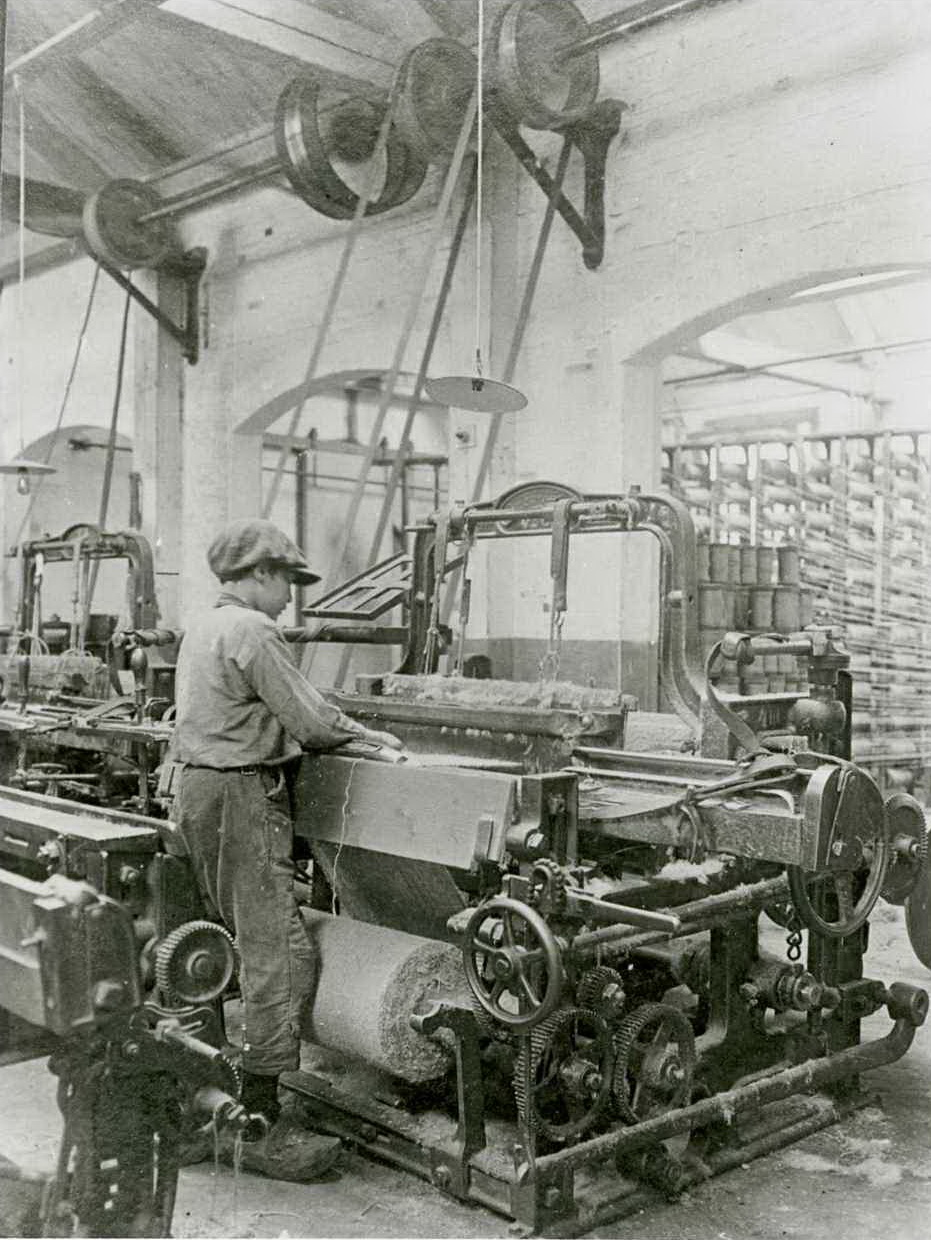

Child labor existed in the Netherlands up to and through the Industrial Revolution (1760-1830). Laws governing child labor in factories were first passed in 1874, although child labor on farms continued to be the norm up until the 20th century.

== History ==
Prior to the Industrial Revolution, the Netherlands was a predominately rural society, and children in rural areas were expected to help with chores and general labor around the farm, oftentimes (especially during harvests) foregoing formal education to work at home. This early form of child labor was a vital source of both labor on farms, but also provided desperately-needed income.

With the beginning of the Industrial Revolution, rural families relocated to urban centers, often lacking access to affordable childcare. The income generated by the children provided essential monetary support for the family. Children provided cheap, agile and fast-learning labor, often able to accomplish manual tasks impossible for adults due to the size of their hands. Factory owners preferred children for their greater docility and willingness to work for lower wages than adults. Due to their increased agility, children were often used for the most dangerous machine maintenance tasks, leading to high death rates among working children.

By 1860, more than 500,000 children (out of a Dutch population of 3,000,000) between the ages of 6 and 11 were employed in Netherlands' factories. During this time, the government actively encouraged the practice of child labor to reduce the price of manufactured goods. Children were employed in various industries, especially textiles, peat excavation, commercial bakeries, and tobacco production. Typical wages in 1860 were 25 cents/day for girls and 35 cents/day for boys.

== The beginnings of change ==
Beginning in the second half of the nineteenth century, sentiment rose against child labor. Realizing that child labor hampered children's education and was detrimental to their health, and that child labor was reducing the opportunities for adult laborers, the Dutch began to react. Newspaper articles and books were published speaking out against the practice, leading to the first child labor law in 1874. Samuel van Houten introduced the Kinderwetje -- van Houten (the Child Labor Act) that forbade children younger than 12 from working in factories. The law stipulated penalties for infractions, but did not authorize any agency to enforce the law. It also included many exceptions, such as farm work and home work. Because of its exceptions and lack of enforcement, the law had little effect on the overall child labor situation. It wasn't until 1882 that the government instituted as system of factory inspections to enforce the child labor laws. From 1882 until 1887, the penalties for illegal child labor were limited to fines levied against the factories, but in 1887, penalties became stricter, which led to an overall decline in child factory labor.

In 1900, the Netherlands passed a law requiring all children to attend school until age 12. Truancy officers were empowered to verify school attendance, and recalcitrant parents were handled with increasingly severe consequences. After age 12, children were free to remain home or enter the work force. There was also at this time the advent of post-compulsory education, providing technical or professional training.

== Present day ==
Currently, children in the Netherlands are required to attend formal education until the age of 18, or until they receive their secondary (high school) diploma. Children are permitted to work from age 13 in limited occupations, with an explicit exclusion on industrial labor. For children under age 15, work is only permitted on non-school days. From age 15, children are permitted to do light, non-industrial labor, although certain occupational restrictions still apply. From 16, children can work in most environments, provided there is no inference with their formal education, and does not deal with any hazardous substances.
