= Geology of the Netherlands =

The geology of the Netherlands describes the geological sequence of the Netherlands. Large parts of the Netherlands today are below sea level and have in the past been covered by the sea or flooded at regular intervals. The modern Netherlands formed as a result of the interplay of the four main rivers (Rhine, Meuse, Schelde and IJssel) and the influence of the North Sea and glaciers during ice-ages. The Netherlands is mostly composed of deltaic, coastal and eolian derived sediments during the Pleistocene glacial and interglacial periods.

Fairly all of the west Netherlands is composed of the Rhine-Meuse river estuary, but human intervention greatly modified the natural processes at work. Most of the western Netherlands is below sea level due to the human watermanagement, lowering the water level by windmills leading to (mostly peaty) soil-subsidence leading to lowering the waterlevel.

In the east of the Netherlands, remains are found of the Saale glaciation, which ended approximately 130,000 years ago. As the continental ice sheet moved in from the north, it pushed moraine forward. The ice sheet halted as it covered the eastern half of the Netherlands. After the ice age ended, the moraine remained in the form a long hill-line. The cities of Arnhem and Nijmegen are built upon these hills.

== Sedimentary succession ==
Map of the Netherlands

=== Paleozoic Era ===
Rocks from the Carboniferous period (360 - 299 mya) outcrop in the southeastern province of Limburg, e.g. in the Heimans quarry. Younger sediments (Permian in age) are not exposed at surface. The subsurface of the Netherlands (including the Dutch sectors of the North Sea) is geologically far more significant, especially with respect to the occurrence of oil and gas resources. The Slochteren reservoir rock in Groningen is an eolian sandstone from the Rotliegend (lower Permian). This reservoir has excellent porosity and permeability characteristics and supplies the vast majority of the Dutch natural gas reserves. The lateral equivalent of this reservoir comes at surface near the German town of Bad Bentheim.

The latest Permian deposits in the area of northwestern Europe was characterised by the laying down of thick successions of rocksalt and anhydrite. This Zechstein stage also comprises dolomites and limestones. The salt is mined in the east of the Netherlands (in villages as Boekelo) and forms an excellent seal over the deeper North Sea reservoirs.

=== Mesozoic Era ===
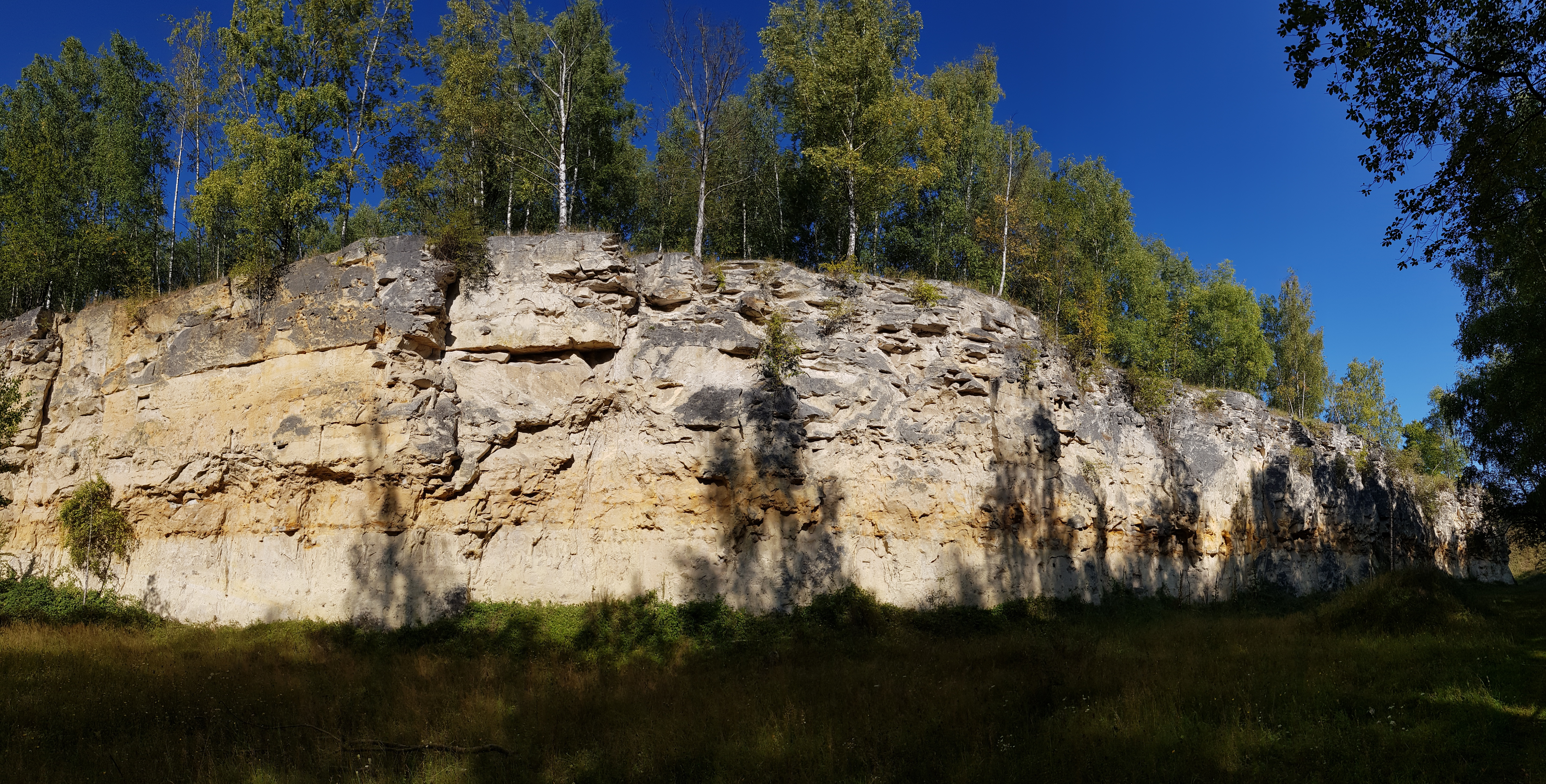
Outcrop of Maastrichtian sedimentary rocks at Groeve 't Rooth, South Limburg

Mesozoic rocks are exposed in the Netherlands in the quarry near Winterswijk (Triassic Muschelkalk limestones). The Jurassic Posidonia Shale is well developed but is buried deep in the West and under the North Sea. It acts as source rock for oil fields in the West Netherlands Basin. During late Jurassic times the Zuidwal volcano was active in a now submerged part of the Netherlands known as the Wadden Sea.

During Cretaceous times, most of the Netherlands was covered by a warm shallow (inland) sea in which thick successions of chalk were deposited. This is in places chert-bearing; chalk is mined near the southern city of Maastricht and the Maastrichtian stage was named after this locality. Here a number of mosasaur-fossils have been excavated as well. The Schoonebeek oil-bearing sandstones are Early Cretaceous in age and underlain by hydrocarbon-rich Lower Cretaceous lacustrine Coevorden Formation which forms the source rock for the east Netherlands oil.

=== Cenozoic Era ===
The Cenozoic is characterised by a further shallowing and erosion of earlier sediments. In places a reasonable thickness of Paleocene and Eocene sediments is reached, but most of the subsurface of the Netherlands lack deposits of this age.

The recent Netherlands is formed by Pleistocene and Holocene age sediments as result of (glacio)-fluvial, eolian and marine sedimentation. Eolian dunes characterise the North Sea coast, a horseshoe-shaped moraine forms the Utrecht Hill Ridge (Dutch: Utrechtse Heuvelrug) and the river influence is still visible all over the Netherlands.

== Tectonics and orogeny ==
Although the Netherlands seems to be a tectonically quiet area, a number of fault activities have been shown in the past. The latest strong earthquake, the 1992 Roermond earthquake (5.4 on Richter scale), had its epicenter close to the Limburg city of Roermond. The south of the Netherlands is topographically higher and is linked to the geology of the Ardennes and the London-Brabant Massif. The Lower Rhine Graben, part of the European Cenozoic Rift System, which has been tectonically active since the Oligocene, affects the southwestern part of the Netherlands.

== See also ==
- Geology of southern North Sea
