= Zuidplaspolder =

Polder in South Holland

Coordinates: 52.02°N 4.614722°E

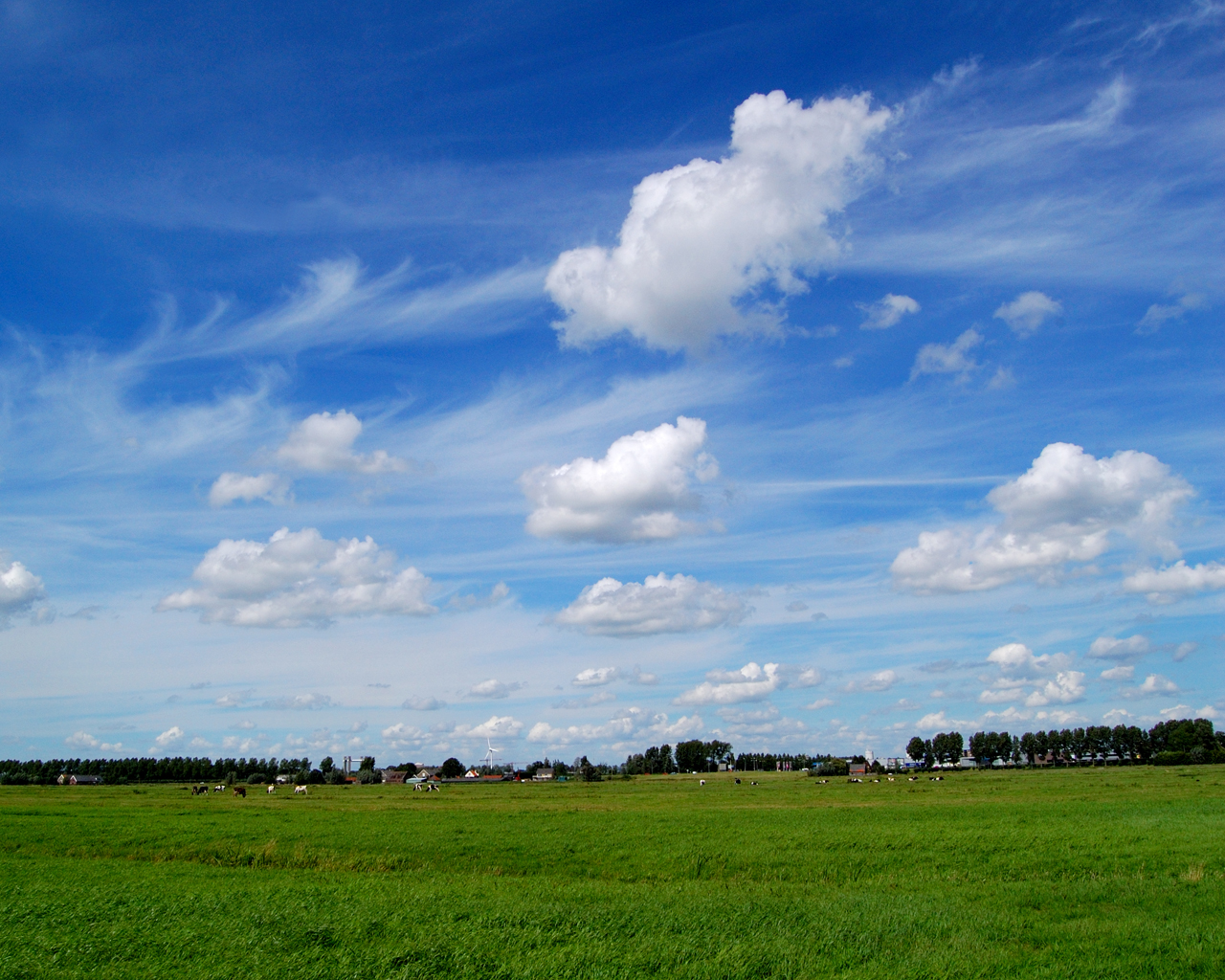
The Zuidplaspolder in Moordrecht

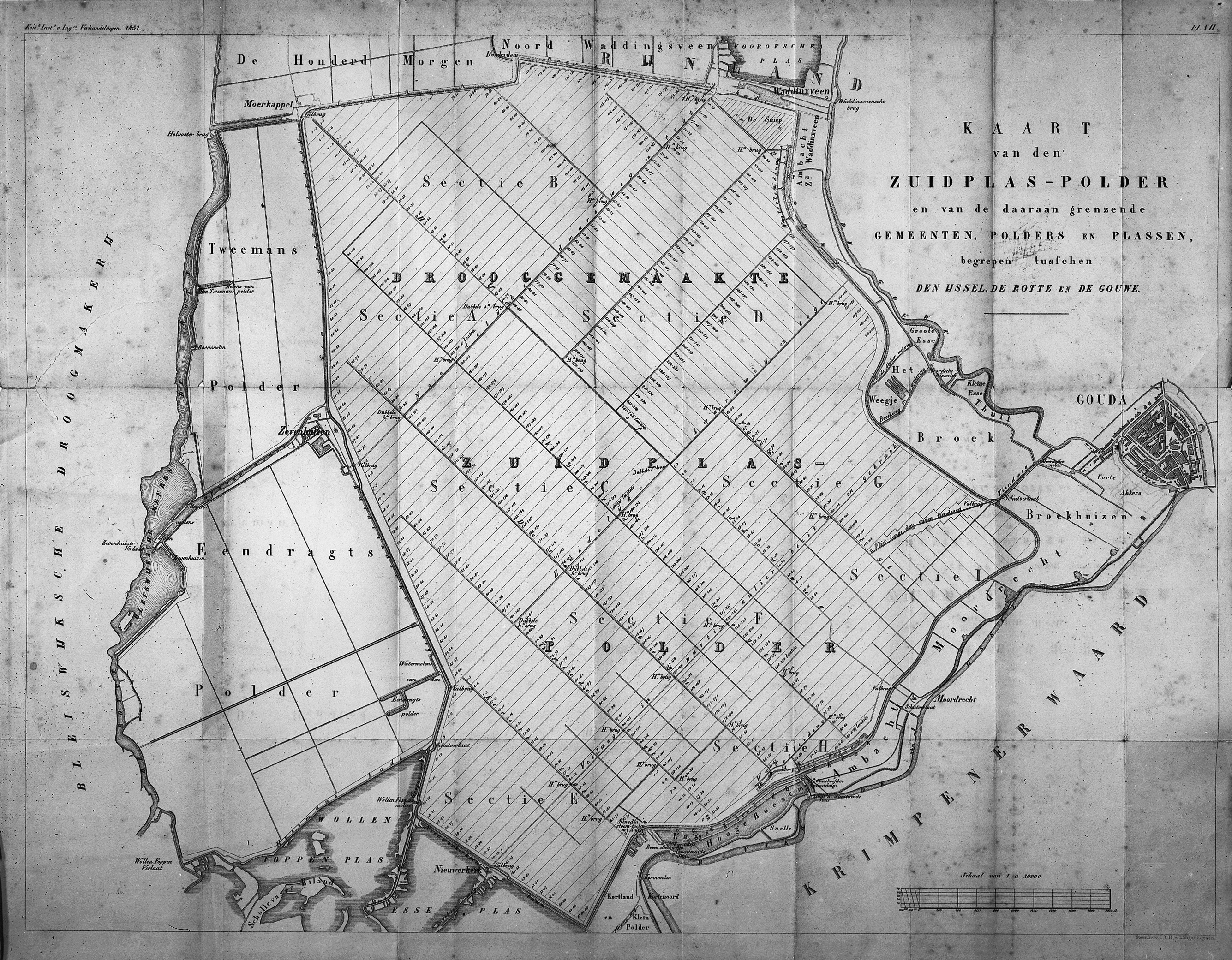
1850 map of the Zuidplaspolder

The Zuidplaspolder is a polder in the western Netherlands, located northeast of Rotterdam, Zuid-Holland, neighbouring settlements such as Zuidplas, Zevenhuizen, Waddinxveen, Moerkapelle, Gouda, Moordrecht, and Nieuwerkerk aan den IJssel. It reaches a depth of 6.76 metres (22 feet 2 inches) below average sea level. This makes it, along with Lammefjord in Denmark, the lowest point of the European Union.

== History ==
Due to lots of soil extraction, there was a large deep lake named the Zuidplas ("South puddle") until the 19th century. This area was viewed as a very worthy land for agriculture. In 1816, King William I decided to drain the lake. During the following years, a plan for the development of the area was developed which was supposed to be deployed between the church towers of Moorkapelle and Moordrecht.

In 1825, reclamation of the area finally started. With the help of 30 windmills, the water was drained into a ring-shaped canal, and the action was finished in 1840. Forty years later, steam pumphouses took over the area and started to regulate the water level.

Currently, electrical pumphouses have mostly replaced the previous buildings, except in a few places.

== Vijfde Dorp ==
On 19 May 2021, the Municipality of Zuidplas announced that there will be a new settlement named Vijfde Dorp ("Fifth village"), along with a renovated surrounding landscape and two industrial estates.

== See also ==
- Lammefjord
- List of countries by lowest point
- Table of elevation extremes by country
- Extreme points of the European Union
