= Zevenhuizen, Zuidplas =

Zevenhuizen
- Village
- Flag Coat of arms

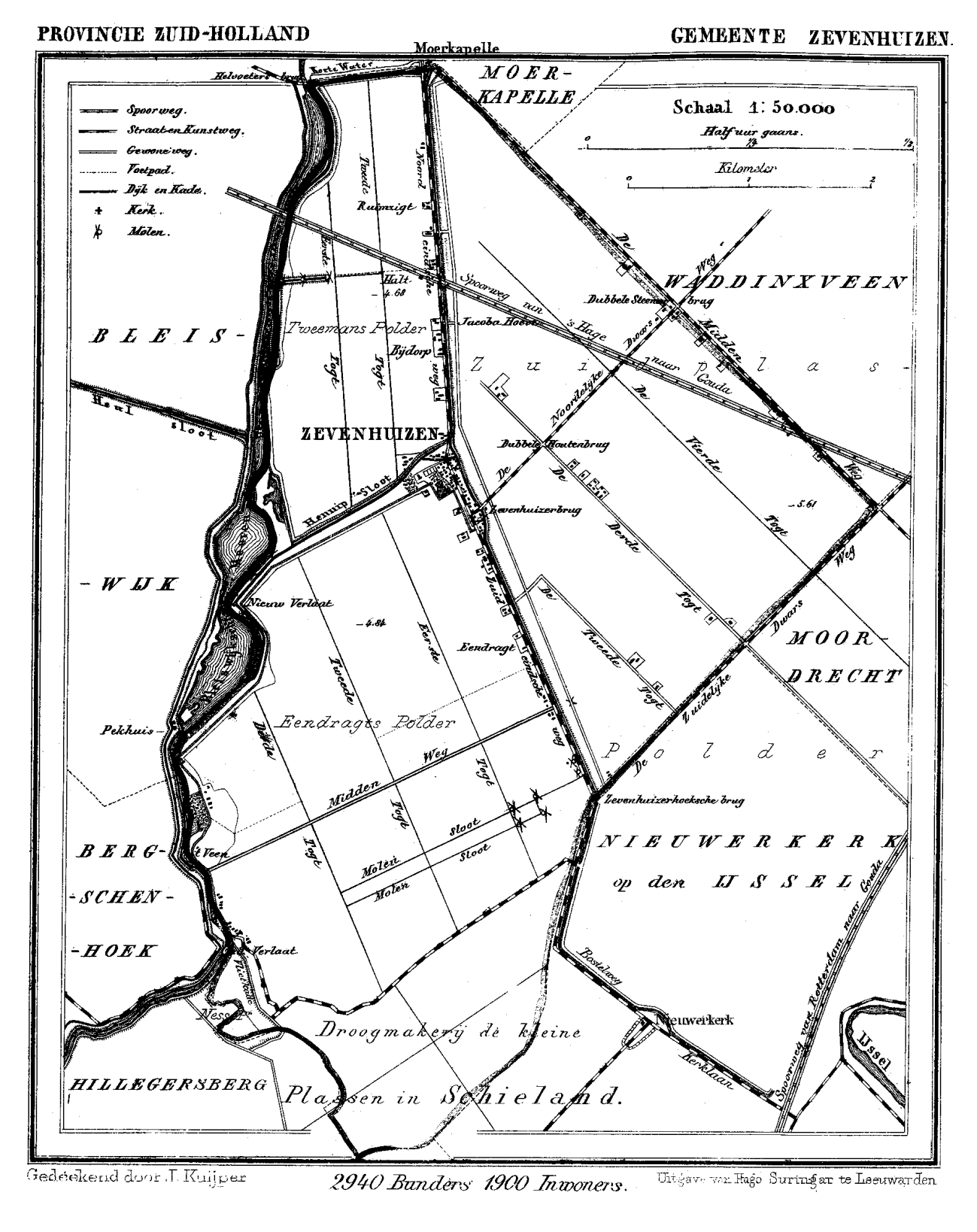
- Zevenhuizen 1865
- Coordinates: 52°0′39″N 4°34′48″E
- Country: Netherlands
- Province: South Holland
- Municipality: Zuidplas

Area
  - Total: 23.64 km^{2} (9.13 sq mi)

Population (2023)
  - Total: 9,650
- Source: CBS, Statline.

Zevenhuizen is a large village in the Dutch province of South Holland. It is located about 12 km northeast of the city of Rotterdam.

Zevenhuizen was a separate municipality until 1991, when it merged with Moerkapelle to form the new municipality of Moerhuizen (renamed in 1992 to Zevenhuizen-Moerkapelle). Since 2010 Zevenhuizen-Moerkapelle is part of the new municipality of Zuidplas.

It lies between the highway A12 and A20. The Rotte (river) also goes past it and it lies in the Tweemanspolder, Zuidplaspolder and the Eendragtspolder. It is surrounded by the villages Moerkapelle, Waddinxveen, Moordrecht, Nieuwerkerk aan den IJssel, Lansingerland, and the neighborhood Nesselande (located in Rotterdam) and Oud Verlaat.
