= Zevenhuizen-Moerkapelle =

- Former municipality
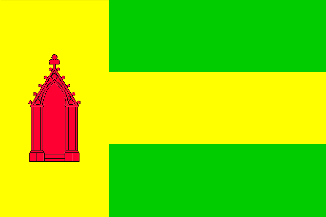
- Flag Coat of arms

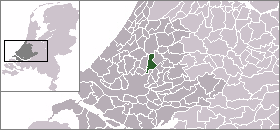
- Coordinates: 52.03°N 4.58°E
- Country: Netherlands
- Province: South Holland
- Municipality: Zuidplas

Area (2006)
  - Total: 31.10 km^{2} (12.01 sq mi)
  - Land: 29.87 km^{2} (11.53 sq mi)
  - Water: 1.23 km^{2} (0.47 sq mi)

Population (1 January 2007)
  - Total: 10,377
  - Density: 347/km^{2} (900/sq mi)
- Source: CBS, Statline.
- Time zone: UTC+1 (CET)
  - Summer (DST): UTC+2 (CEST)
- Website: www.zevenhuizen-moerkapelle.nl

Zevenhuizen-Moerkapelle (Dutch pronunciation: [ˈzeːvə(n)ɦœyzə ˌmuːrkaːˈpɛlə]) is a former municipality in the western Netherlands, in the province of South Holland.

The municipality was formed on January 1, 1991, through the merger of Moerkapelle and Zevenhuizen. It was initially called Moerhuizen before being renamed to Zevenhuizen-Moerkapelle on February 1, 1992.

The municipality joined the new municipality of Zuidplas on January 1, 2010.

It consisted of the population centres of Moerkapelle, Oud Verlaat, and Zevenhuizen.

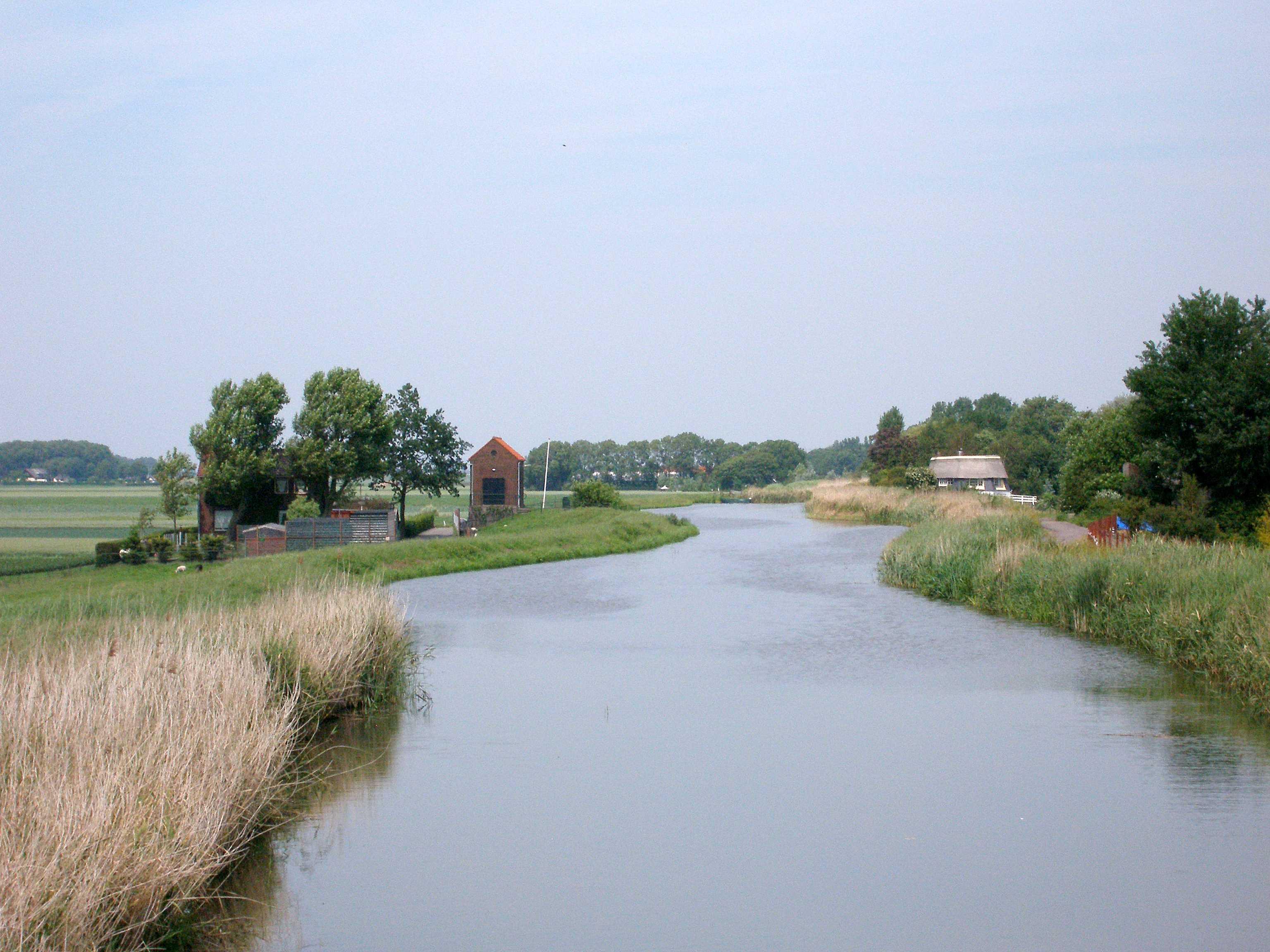
The river Rotte forms within the municipality of Zuidplas.
