= Moordrecht =

- Village
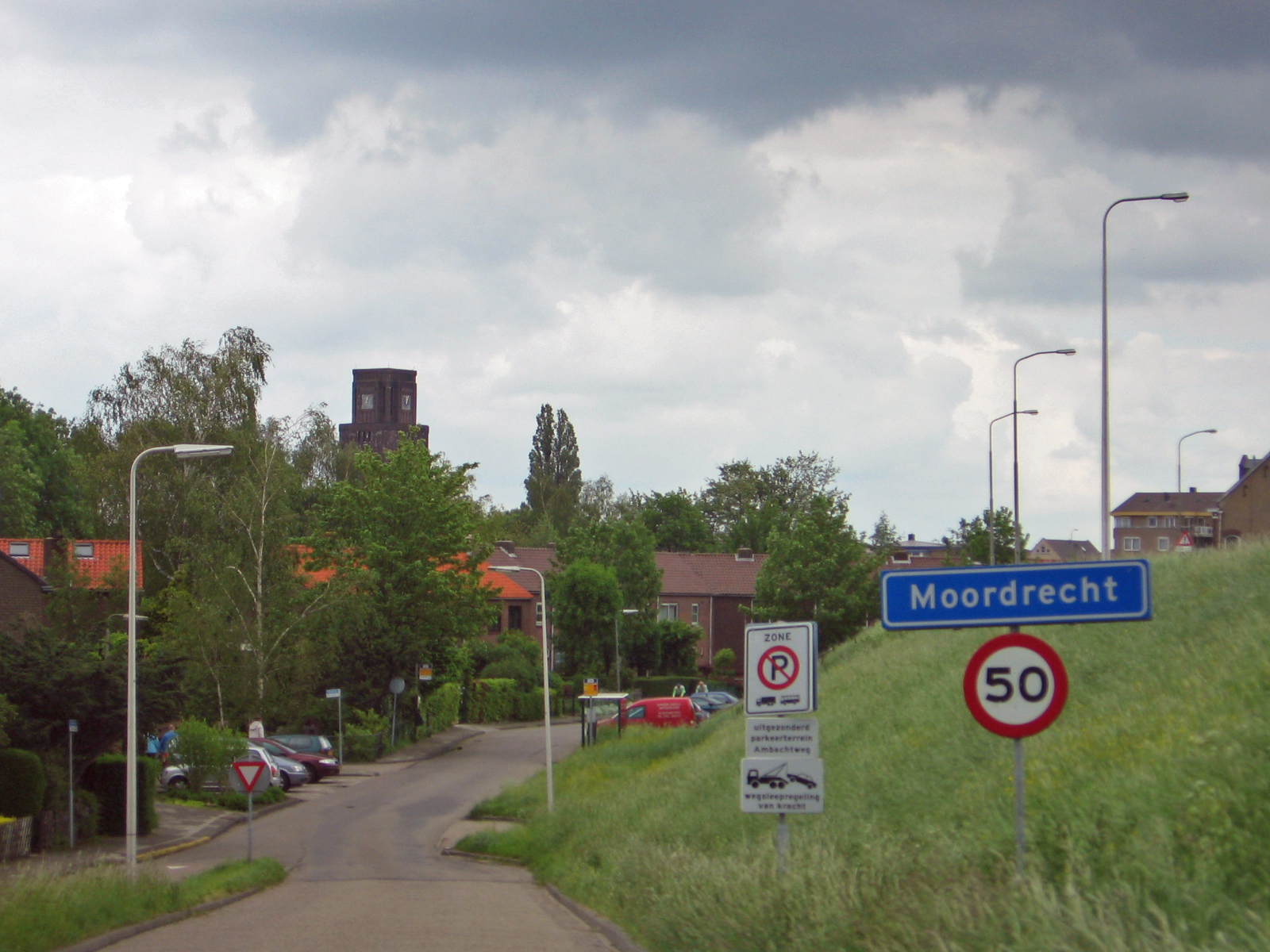

- Flag Coat of arms
- Interactive map of Moordrecht
- Coordinates: 51°59′10″N 4°40′05″E
- Country: Netherlands
- Province: South Holland
- Municipality: Zuidplas

Population (2023)
  - Total: 9,015
- Source: CBS, Statline.
- Time zone: UTC+1 (CET)
  - Summer (DST): UTC+2 (CEST)
- Website: www.moordrecht.nl

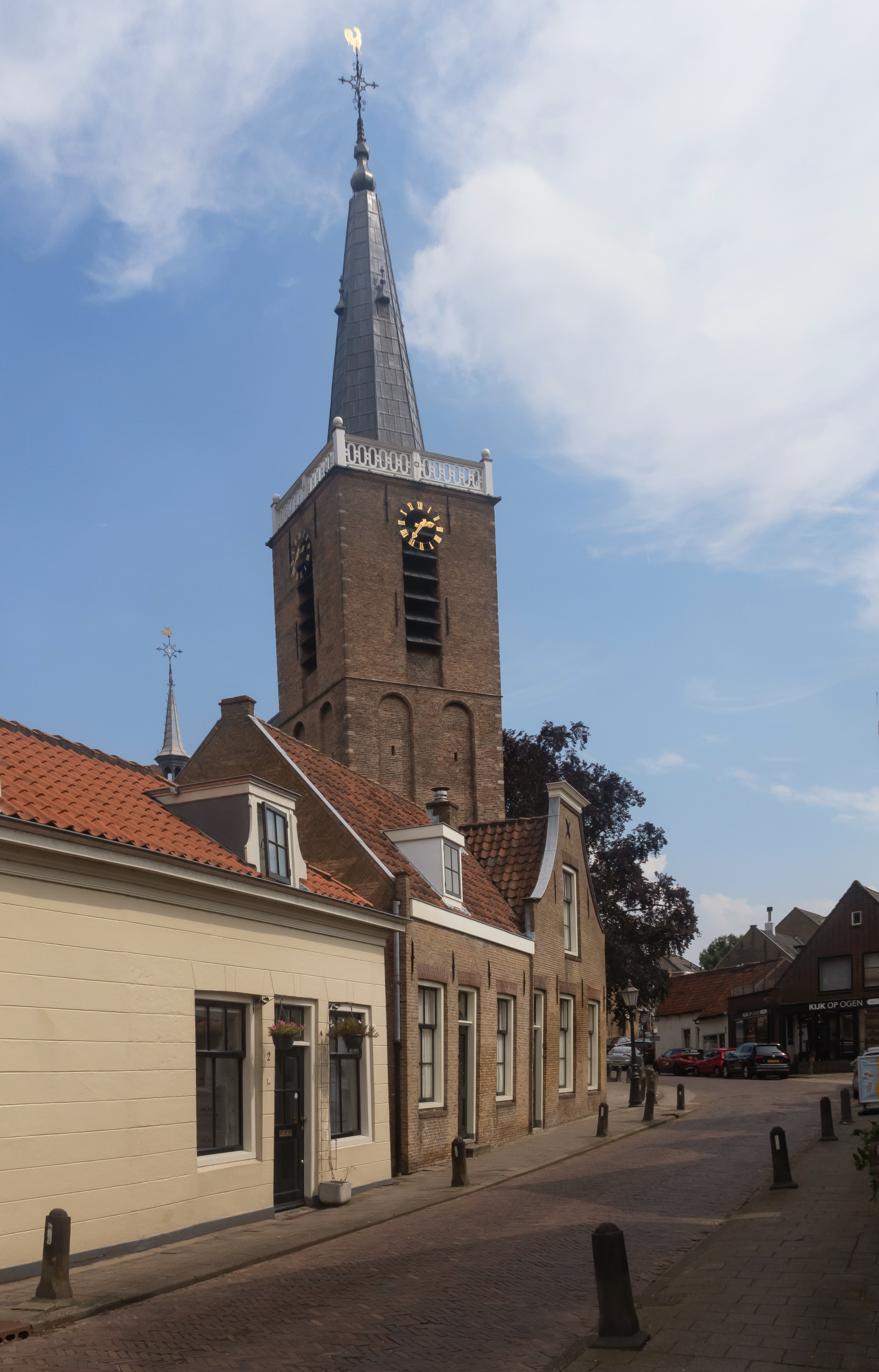
Reformed church in the street

Moordrecht (Dutch: [ˈmoːrdrɛxt]) is a village and a former municipality in the province of South Holland, the Netherlands, situated along the river Hollandse IJssel.

In September 2006, 93% of the population of Moordrecht chose by referendum to pursue a merger with the neighboring municipalities Nieuwerkerk aan den IJssel and Zevenhuizen-Moerkapelle. Only 7% chose to merge with Gouda. Based on this result, the town council decided to form the new municipality Zuidplas in 2010 with Nieuwerkerk aan den IJssel and Zevenhuizen-Moerkapelle.

International footballer Memphis Depay was born there.

"Moor" means swamp, marsh or 'moor' while "drecht" means floodland or something similar.
