= Rotte (river) =

River in the Netherlands

Coordinates: 51.927°N 4.4845°E

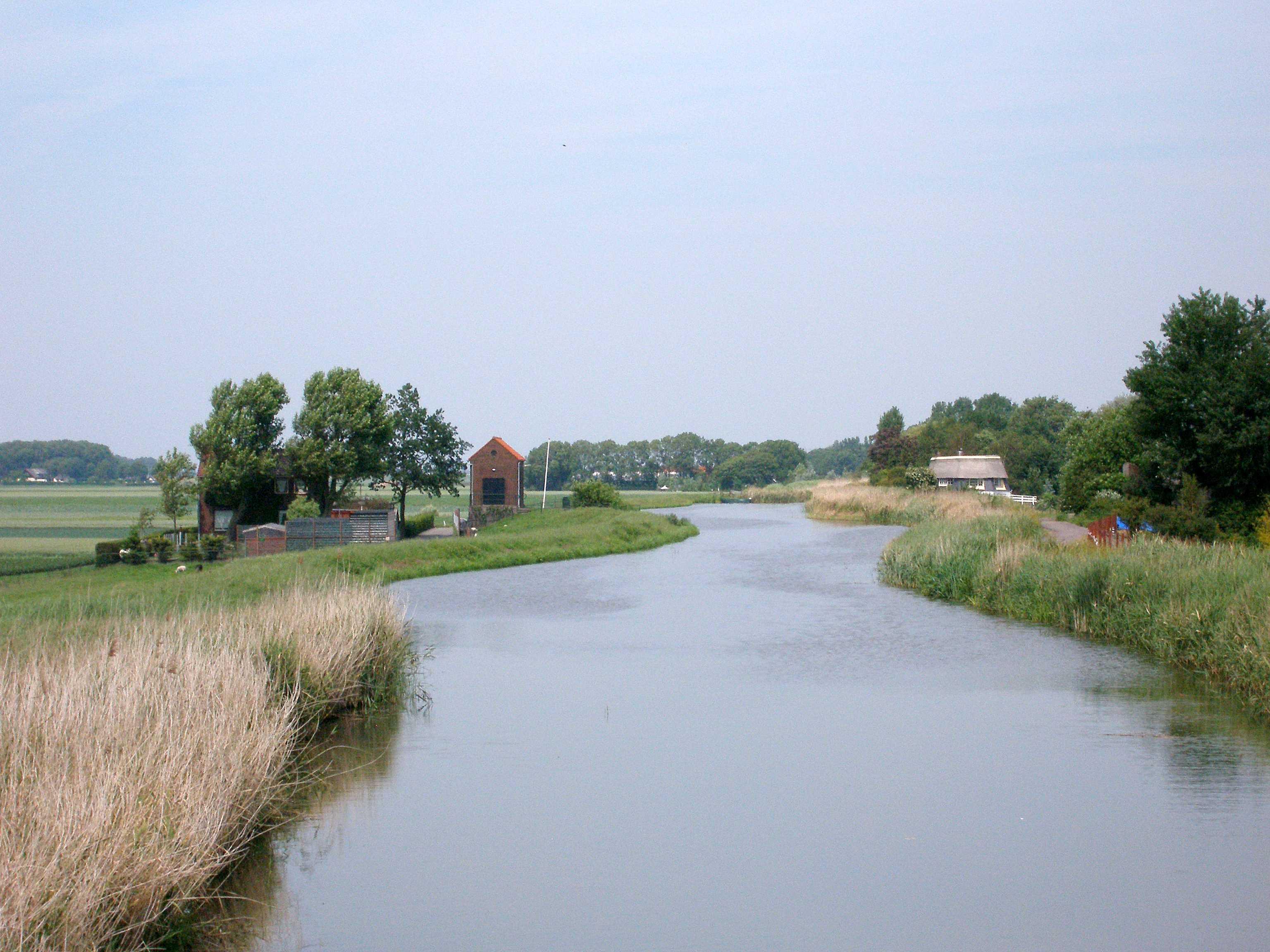

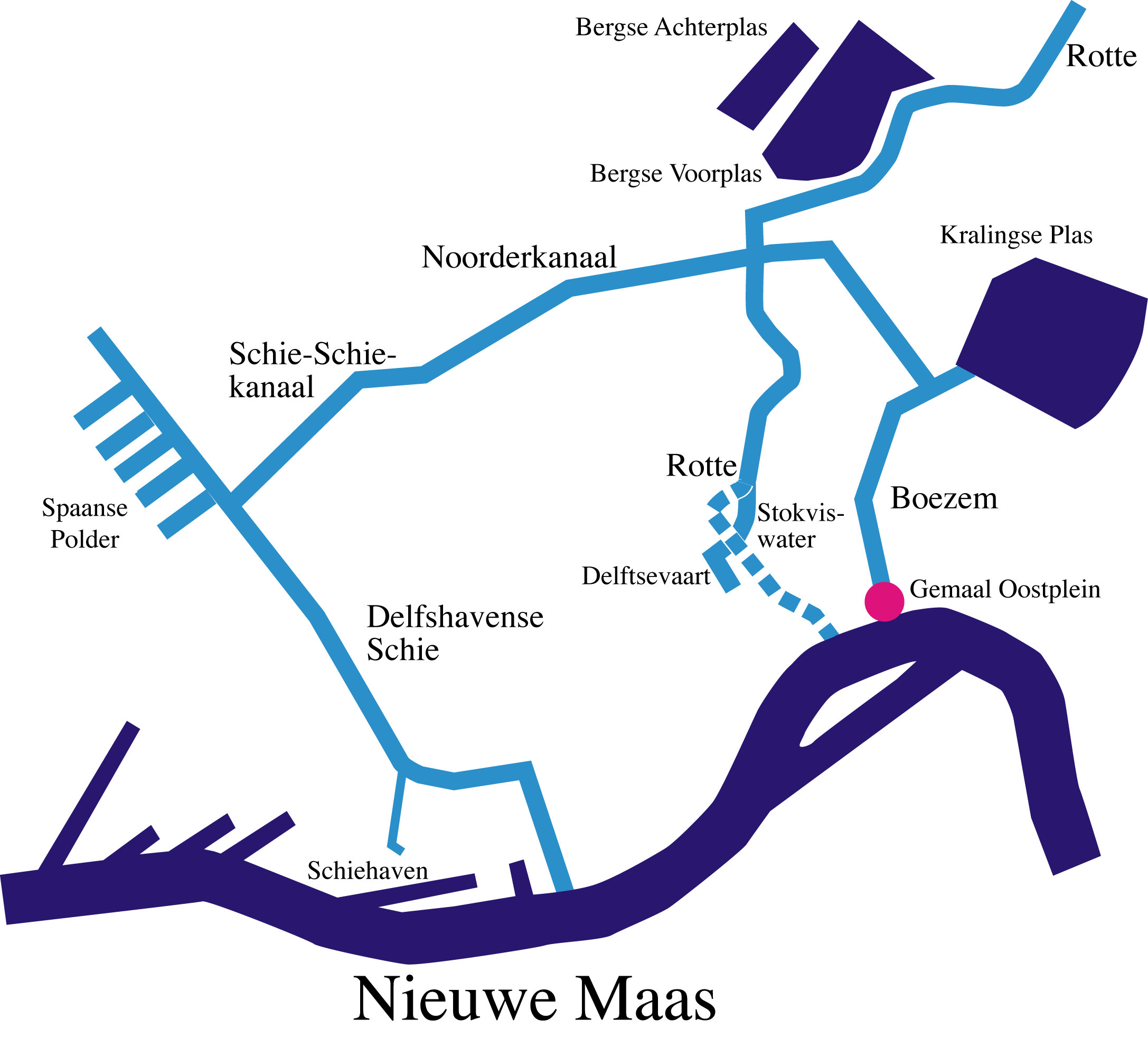
- Location of the Rotte around Rotterdam, upstream part omitted

Location
- Country: Netherlands
- State: Zuid-Holland
- Cities: Rotterdam

Physical characteristics
- Source: Moerkapelle
  - location: https://www.openstreetmap.org/#map=17/52.049116/4.563242
- Mouth: Nieuwe Maas
  - location: Zuid-Holland, Netherlands
- Length: 22 km (14 mi)

The Rotte (Dutch pronunciation: [ˈrɔtə]) is a river in the Rhine-Maas-delta in the Netherlands. The Rotte is the eponym of the city of Rotterdam: the city's name references a dam (Middle Dutch: dam) which local inhabitants built across the river in the 13th century CE.

== Etymology ==
The river was originally named Rotta, from rot, meaning "muddy" and aa meaning "water," thus "muddy water."

== Geography ==
It rises in Moerkapelle in the so-called Green Heart. It used to drain the Zuidplas lake until it was reclaimed in 1840.

It flows via a wider part called "de Rottemeren" (Rotte lakes) past Bleiswijk and Bergschenhoek; and then the village of Hillegersberg, which was built on a sand dune and was one of the few places in the marsh land that could be permanently settled before the dikes were constructed. In the churchyard there are the ruins of a 13th-century castle whose origins probably date back to the Roman Empire. Originally it flowed into the Nieuwe Maas in Rotterdam; however, the lower reach of the river was dammed off and the water now flows to the Nieuwe Maas via several man-made canals.

On the outskirts of Rotterdam, the Rotte merges with the Crooswijksesingel. Here, there is an old factory building of the Heineken brewery, which was brought here in the city due to the efforts of Lodewijk Pincoffs.

== Inner Rotte ==
The Inner Rotte, that is, the part of the river in the Rotterdam city area, had to give way in 1869–1871 to the construction of the "Luchtspoor", an elevated section of the railway line. The river water was diverted via the Stokvisverlaat, the Delftse Vaart and Vlasmarktsluis to the Leuvehaven. When the Luftwaffe bombed the city in 1940, this connection was also damaged. During the Second World War, city planner Willem Gerrit Witteveen created a new connection to Leuvehaven. After the war, the Rotte was no longer used for freight transport.

The construction of the east–west line of the Rotterdam Metro interrupted the direct connection between the Rotte and Nieuwe Maas. Since then, the river water flows through an underground channel to the Oostplein.

In 1993 the elevated section of the railroad was demolished; trains now use the "Willemspoor" tunnel. Plans were made to dredge the old river bed and fill it with water. These plans were never implemented. The Inner Rotte is now a wide avenue, where events such as markets can be held. The former dam was situated where today the Inner Rotte crosses the Hoogstraat ('High Street').

== Gallery ==
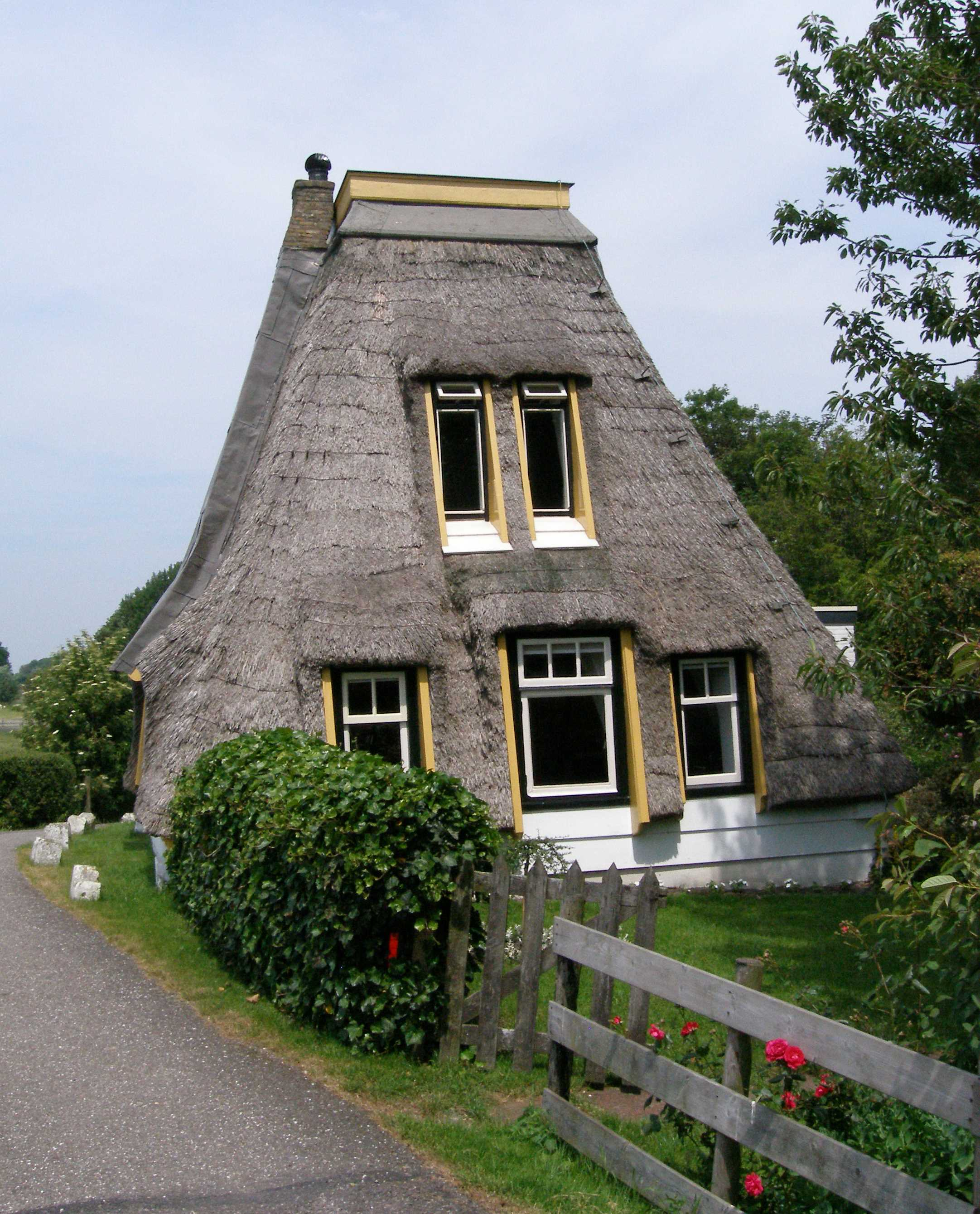
Former windmill de Oorsprong

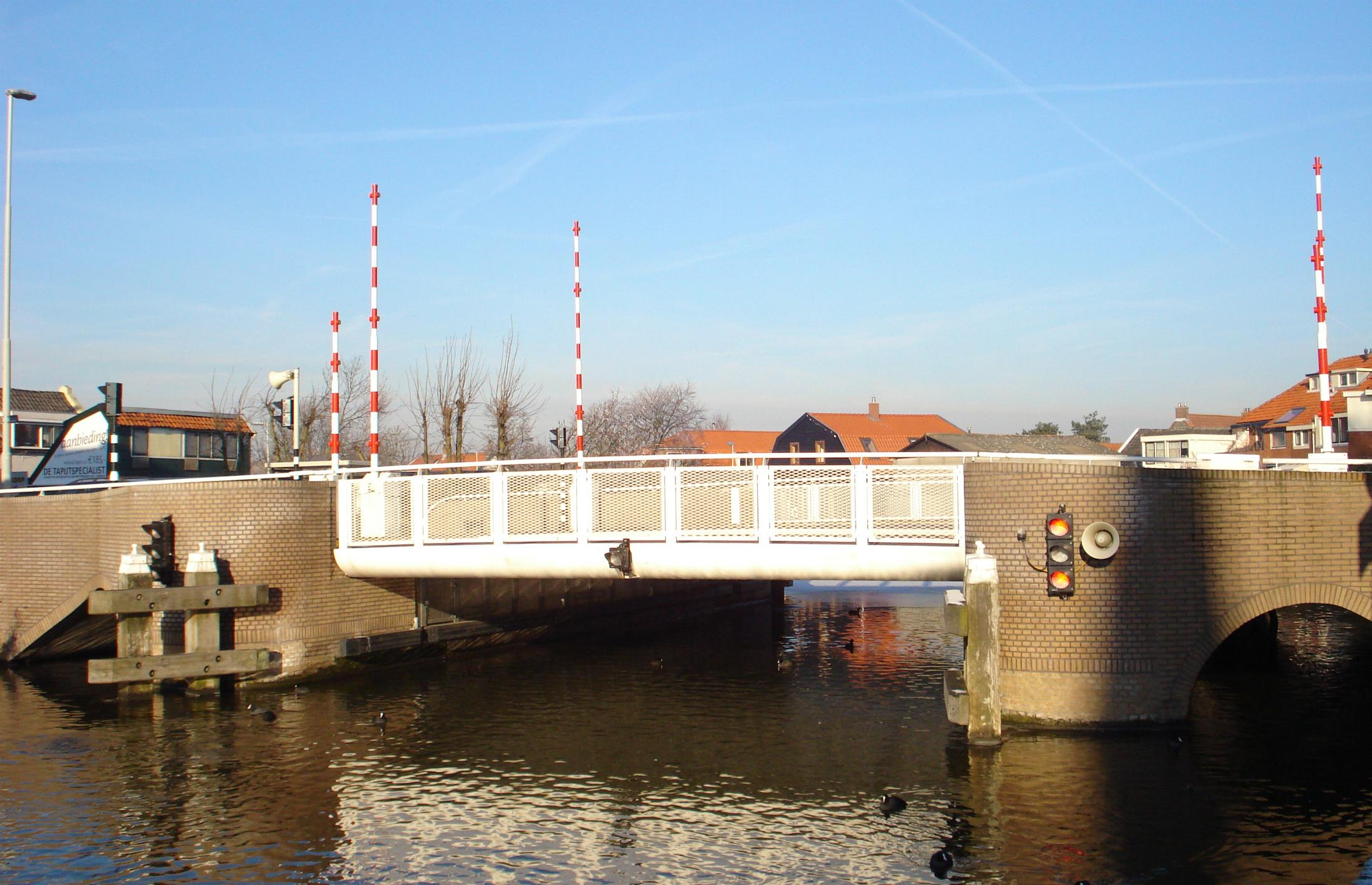
Prinses Irenebrug near Terbregge

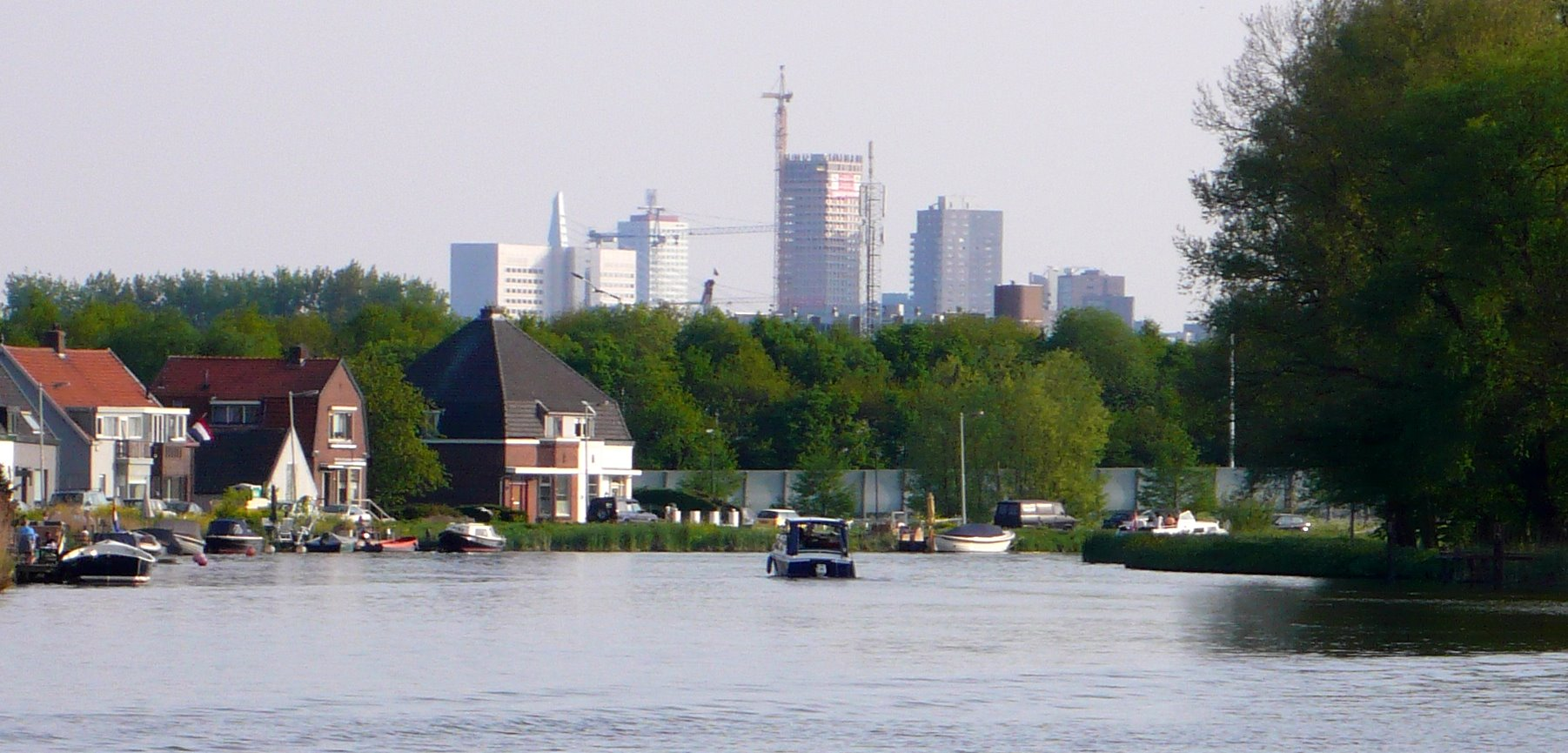
The Rotte at Hillegersberg

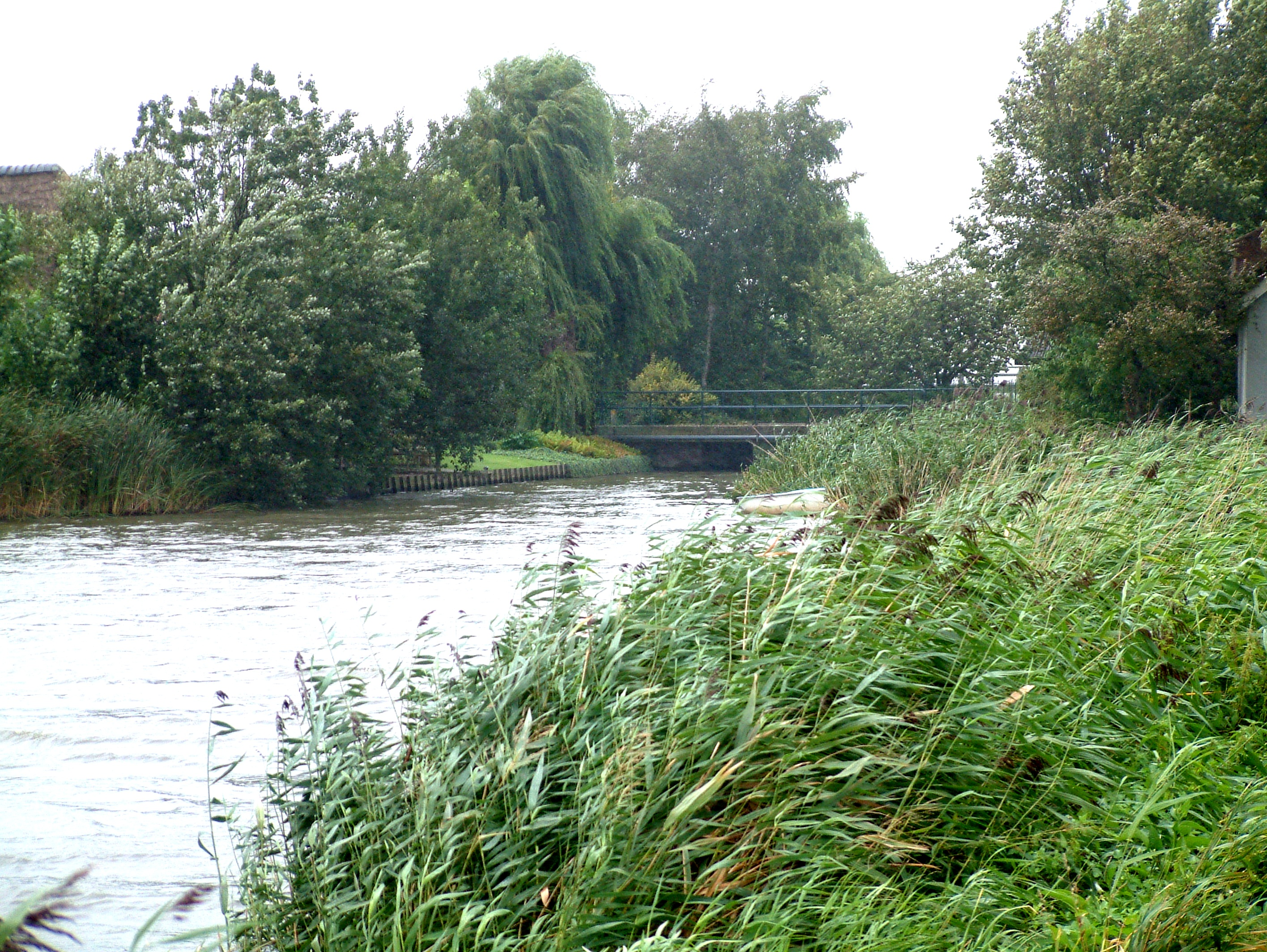
The Rotte near Hollevoeterbrug

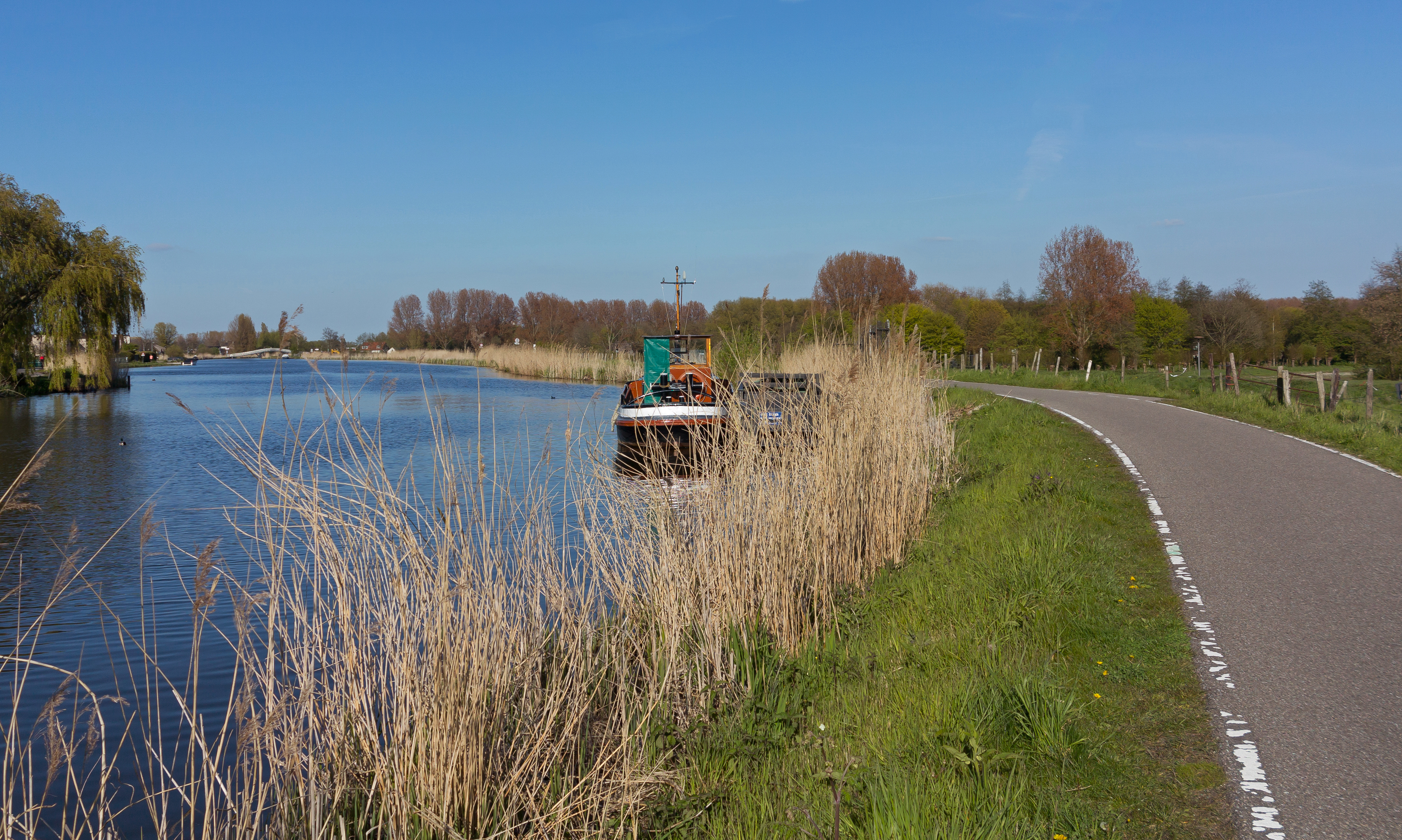
The Rotte near Prins Alexander

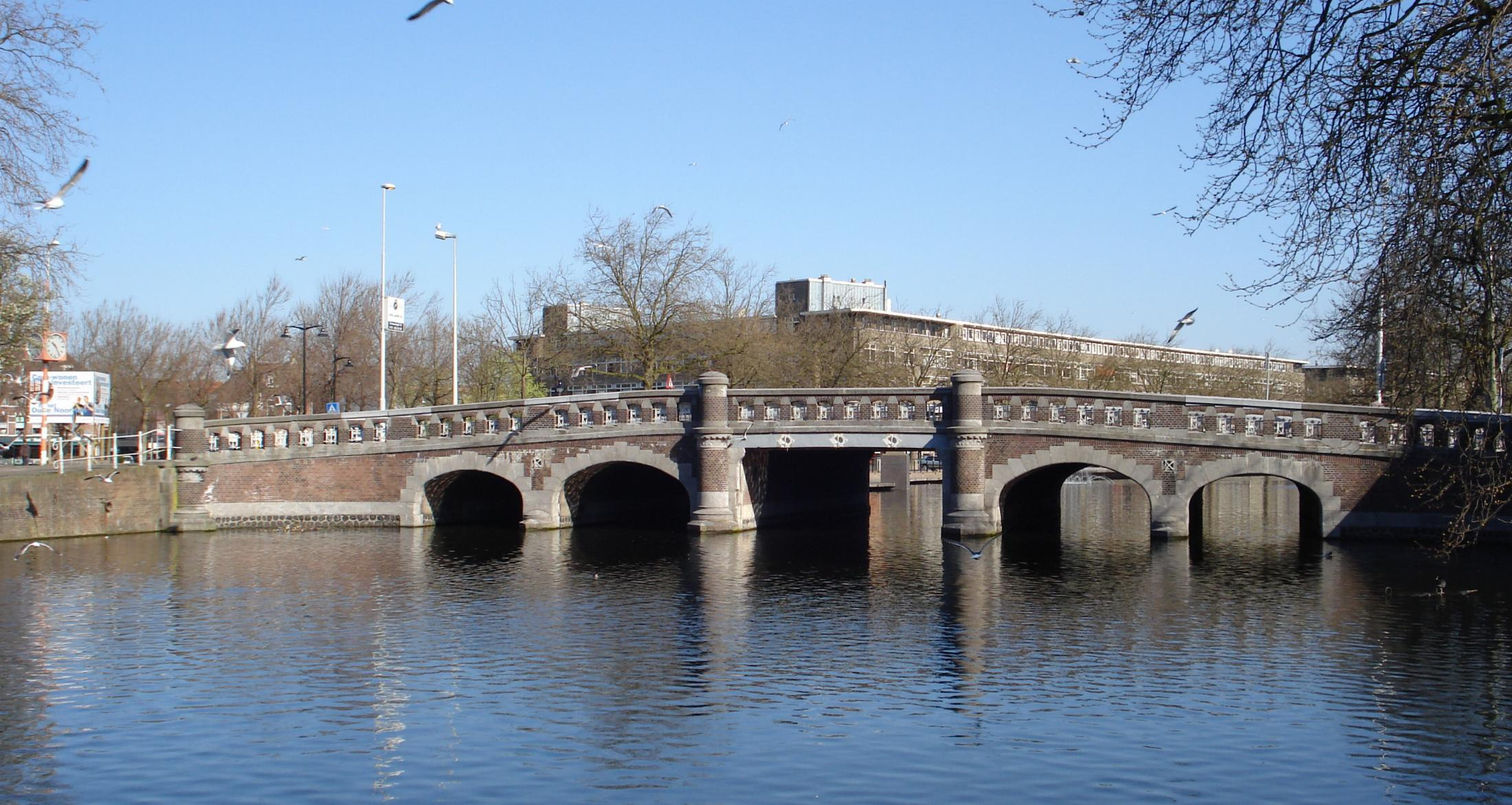
Noorderbrug at Crooswijk

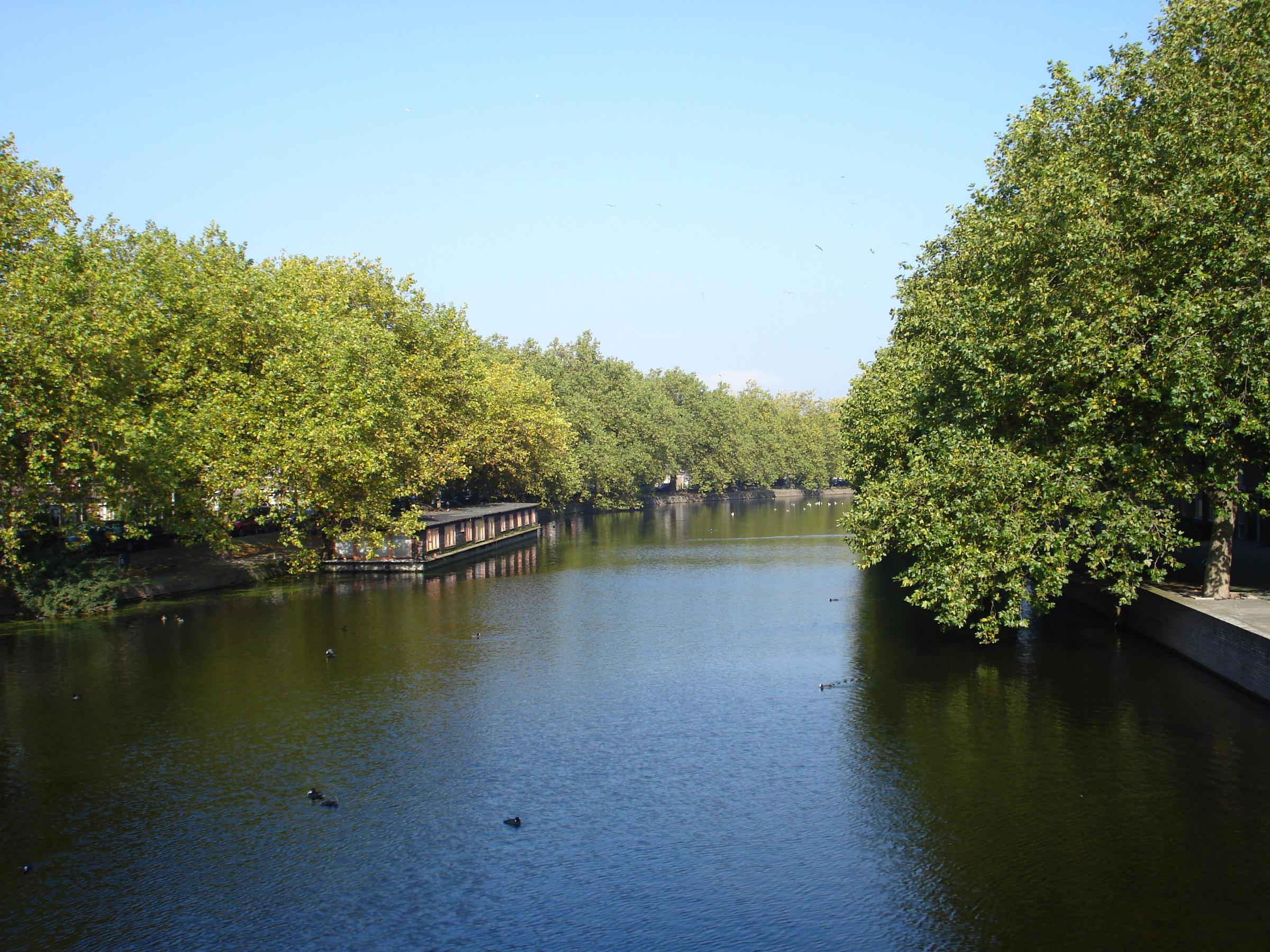
Viewed from the Admiraal de Ruyterweg in Rotterdam

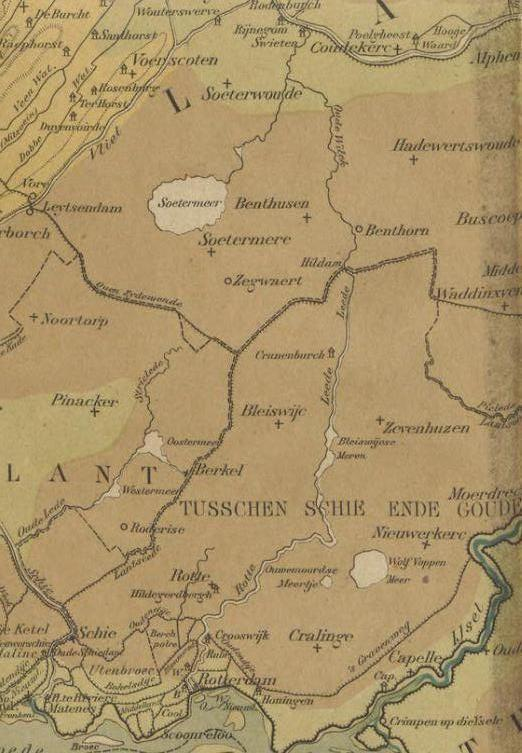
River flow of the Rotte in 1300
