= Hans Spekman =

Dutch politician

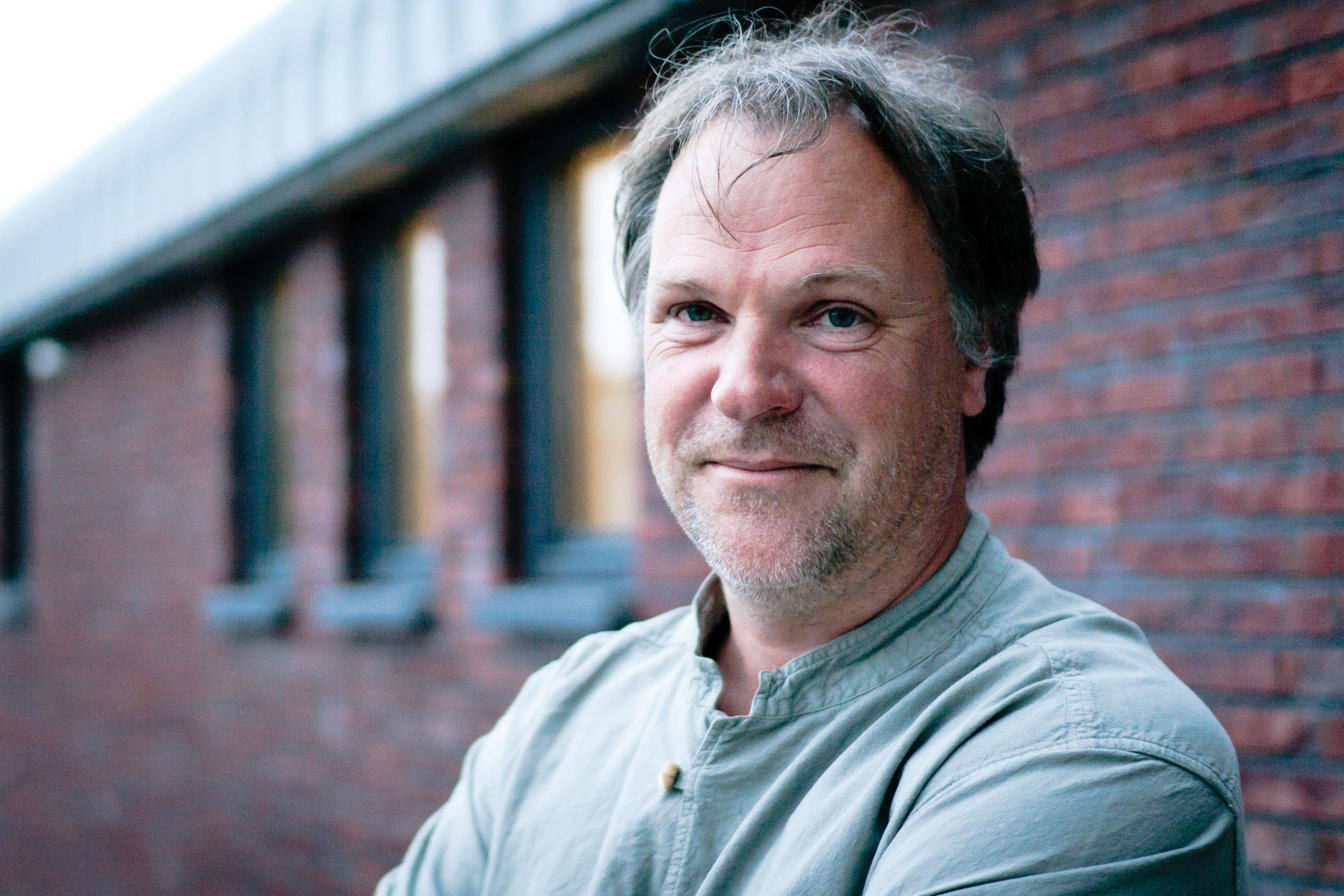
- Hans Spekman in 2012

Chairman of the Labour Party
- In office 2 January 2012 – 7 October 2017
- Preceded by: Lilianne Ploumen
- Succeeded by: Nelleke Vedelaar

Member of the House of Representatives
- In office 30 November 2006 – 25 January 2012

Alderman of Utrecht
- In office 1 January 2001 – 1 May 2006

Member of the municipal council of Utrecht
- In office 1 April 1994 – 1 January 2001

Personal details
- Born: Johannes Leonardus Spekman; 6 April 1966 (age 60) Zevenhuizen, Netherlands
- Party: Labour Party (1986–2026); Progressief Nederland (2026–present)

Johannes Leonardus "Hans" Spekman (Dutch pronunciation: [joːˈɦɑnəs leːjoːˈnɑrdʏs ɦɑns ˈspɛkmɑn]; born 6 April 1966) is a Dutch politician of the Labour Party. He was a local politician in Utrecht from 1994 to 2006 and a member of the House of Representatives from 2006 to 2012. He was the party chair of the Labour Party between 2012 and 2017. In March 2026, he became the chairman of the Federation of Dutch Trade Unions.

== Early life and career ==
Johannes Leonardus Spekman was born on 6 April 1966 in Zevenhuizen in South Holland in the Netherlands.

He worked as a welder, mover, and environmental bookseller.

== Politics ==
Spekman has been a member of the Labour Party since 1986.

He was a member of the municipal council of Utrecht from 1 April 1994 to 1 January 2001 and an alderman of Utrecht from 1 January 2001 to 1 May 2006.

Spekman was a member of the House of Representatives from 30 November 2006 to 24 January 2012. He focused on matters of alien and asylum policy, employment and social assistance policy, as well as poverty and benefit fraud control.

Spekman was chairman of the Labour Party since 2 January 2012, when he succeeded Lilianne Ploumen, until 7 October 2017.

In 2016 he organized a battle for the leadership of the Labour Party between the then–party leader Diederik Samsom and deputy prime minister Lodewijk Asscher. The battle had a disastrous effect on the unity within the party and led to the end of the political career of Samsom. In 2017 Spekman led the campaign of his party in the parliamentary elections for the House of Representatives. On 15 March the Labour Party suffered a historical defeat of 29 seats in the House. The party ended up with nine seats. After the defeat members of the Labour party called for the resignation as party chairman of Hans Spekman. On 17 March he announced that he would step down in autumn 2017. A day later, at the PvdA members' council, it was decided with just over 60% of the votes that, in accordance with his own request, Spekman could remain chairman until October 7. He was succeeded by Nelleke Vedelaar.

When the Labour Party formed an electoral alliance with GroenLinks in the early 2020s, Spekman supported Rood Vooruit, an initiative founded in 2023 that has been critical of merger plans. At the founding congress of Progressief Nederland (Pro) in June 2026, Spekman publicly announced he would become a member of Pro to bolster the cooperation between the Dutch labour movement and the new party.

In March 2026, Spekman became chairman of the Federation of Dutch Trade Unions (FNV), with the goal of returning stability to the FNV after years of internal conflict.

== Personal life ==
Spekman lives in the city of Utrecht.

Party political offices
| Preceded by Lilianne Ploumen | Chairman of the Labour Party; 2012–present | Incumbent |
