= Zuidplas =

- Municipality
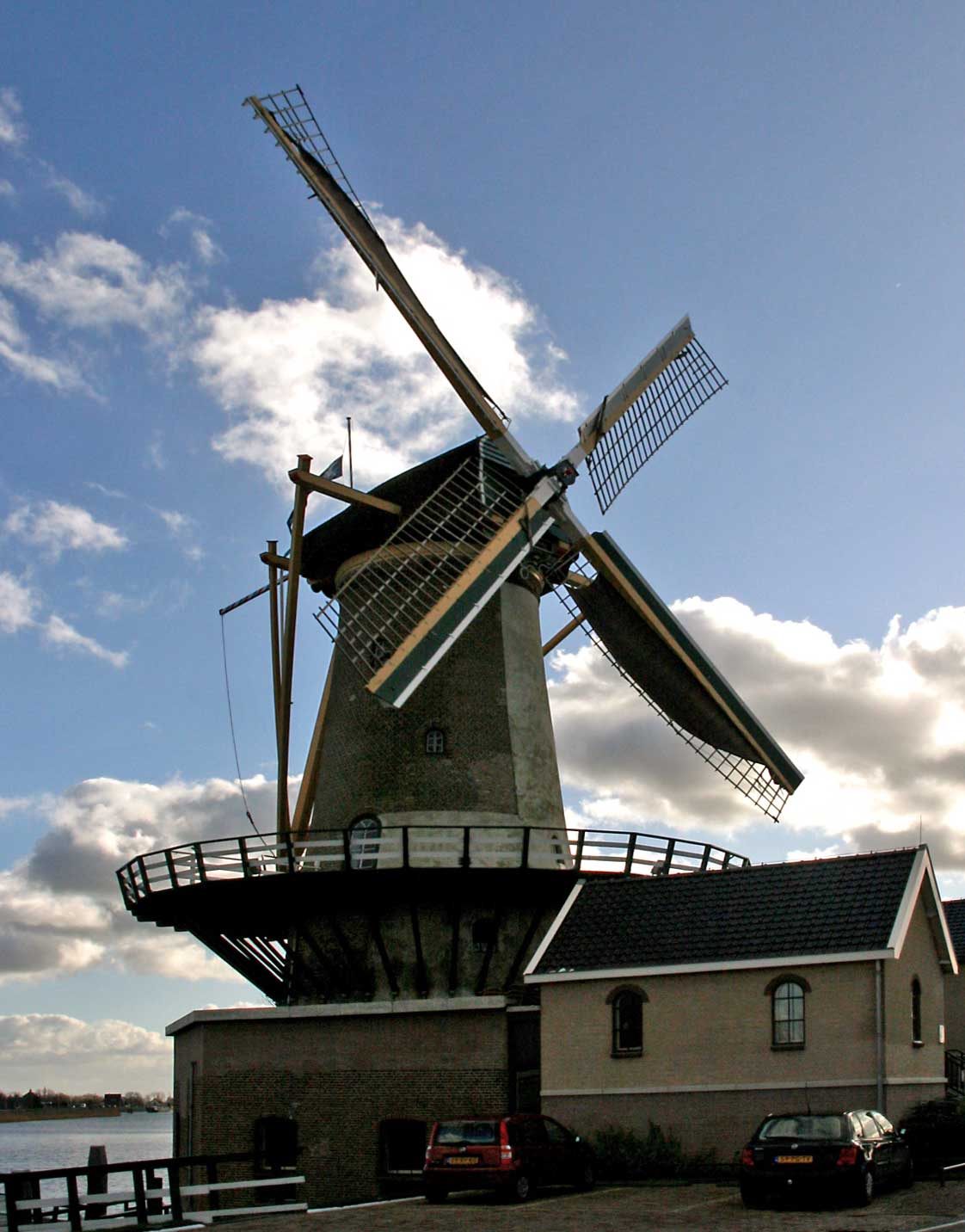
- Wind mill "Windlust" in Nieuwerkerk aan den IJssel

- Flag Coat of arms

- Location in South Holland
- Coordinates: 51°58′N 4°37′E
- Country: Netherlands
- Province: South Holland
- Established: 1 January 2010

Government
  - Body: Municipal council
  - Mayor: Gert-Jan Kats (SGP)

Area
  - Total: 64.05 km^{2} (24.73 sq mi)
  - Land: 58.02 km^{2} (22.40 sq mi)
  - Water: 6.03 km^{2} (2.33 sq mi)
- Elevation: −6 m (−20 ft)
- Lowest elevation: −6.76 m (−22.2 ft)

Population (January 2021)
  - Total: 45,064
  - Density: 777/km^{2} (2,010/sq mi)
- Time zone: UTC+1 (CET)
  - Summer (DST): UTC+2 (CEST)
- Postcode: 2750–2761, 2840–2841, 2910–2914
- Area code: 0180, 0182, 079
- Website: www.zuidplas.nl

Zuidplas (Dutch pronunciation: [ˈzœytplɑs]) is a municipality in the Netherlands located in the province of South Holland. It was established on 1 January 2010 by the joining of Moordrecht, Nieuwerkerk aan den IJssel, and Zevenhuizen-Moerkapelle. It had a population of 41,753 as of August 2017.

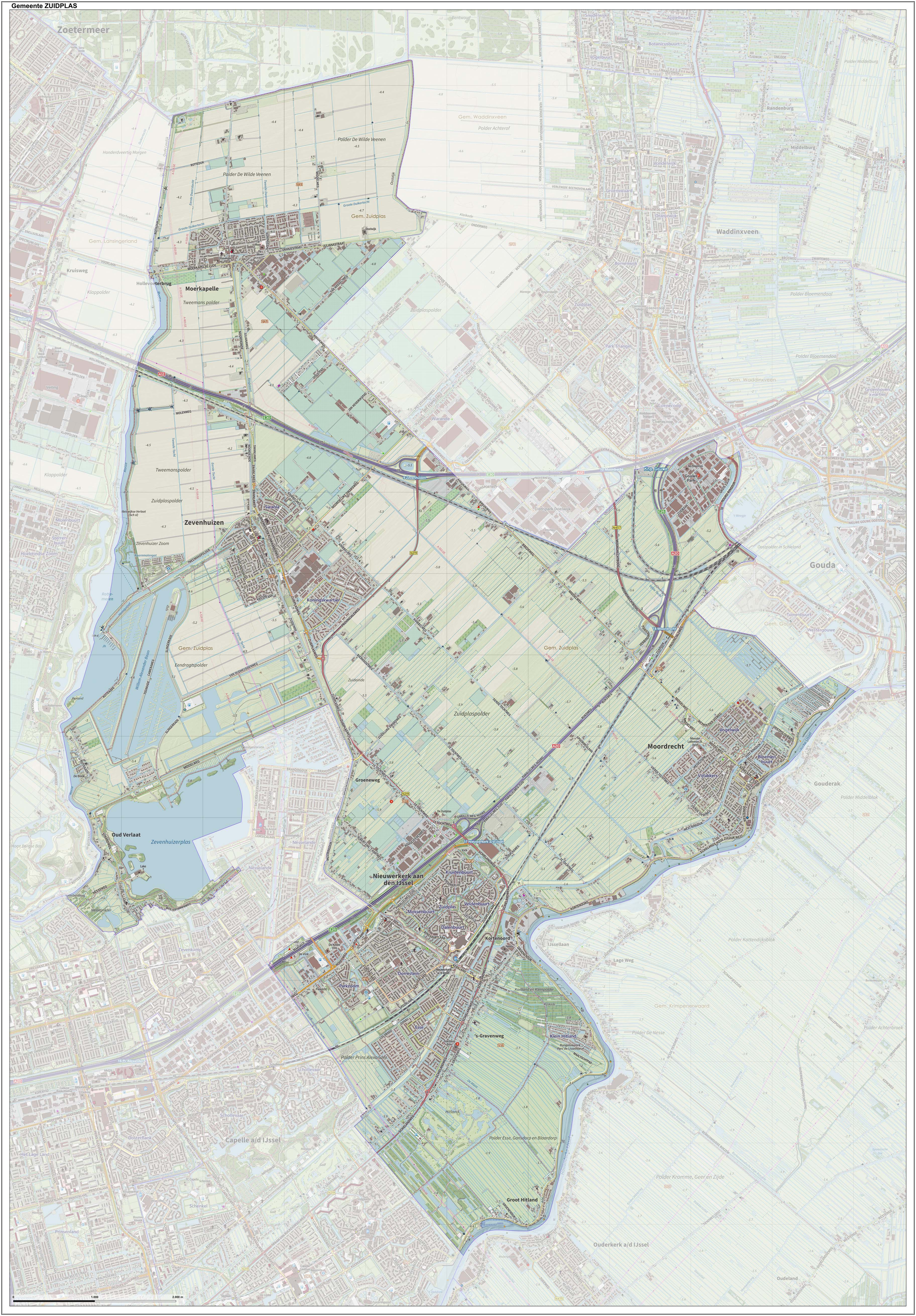
Topographic map of the municipality of Zuidplas, September 2014

== Notable people ==
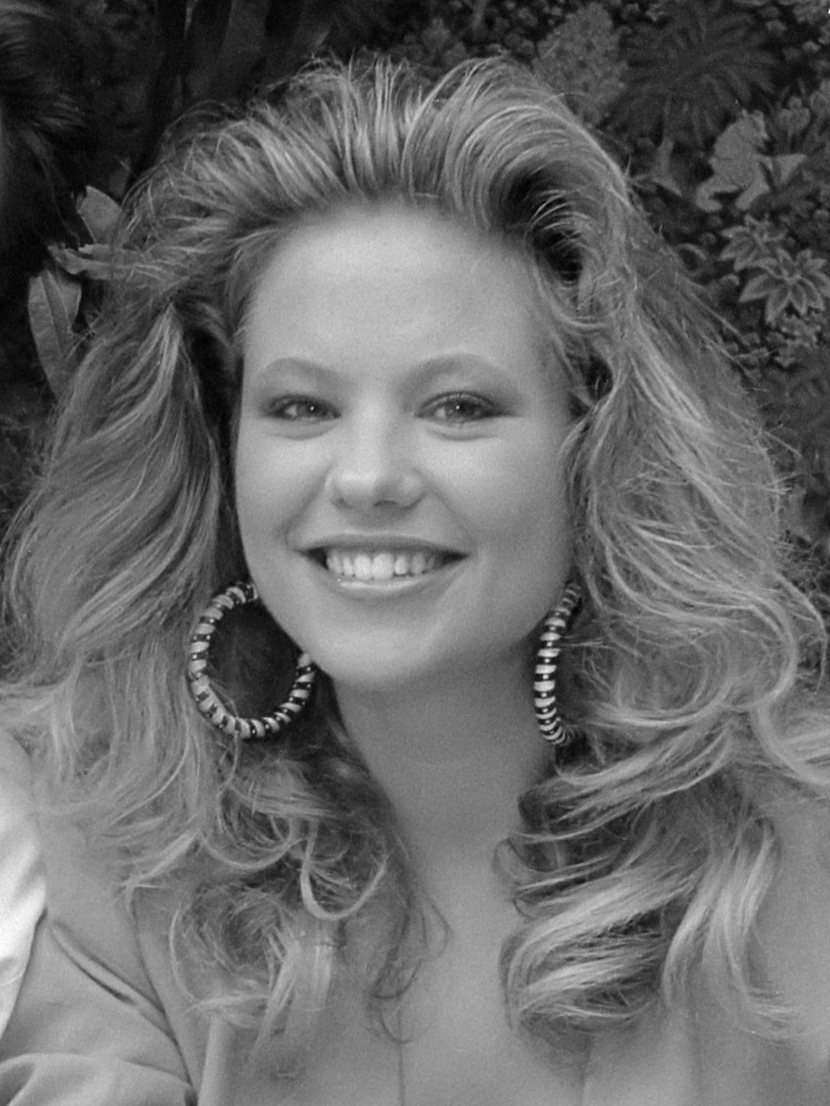
Angela Visser, 1989

- Claes Michielsz Bontenbal (1575–1623) Secretary of Zevenhuizen and conspirator
- Lia van Rhijn (born 1953) ceramist and sculptor
- Arie Slob (born 1961) politician and history teacher
- Angela Visser (born 1966) actress, model and beauty queen, Miss Universe 1989
- Hans Spekman (born 1966) politician
- Dirk Bruinenberg (born 1968) musician, former drummer of metal and power metal bands
- Tamara van Ark (born 1974) politician and minister

=== Sport ===
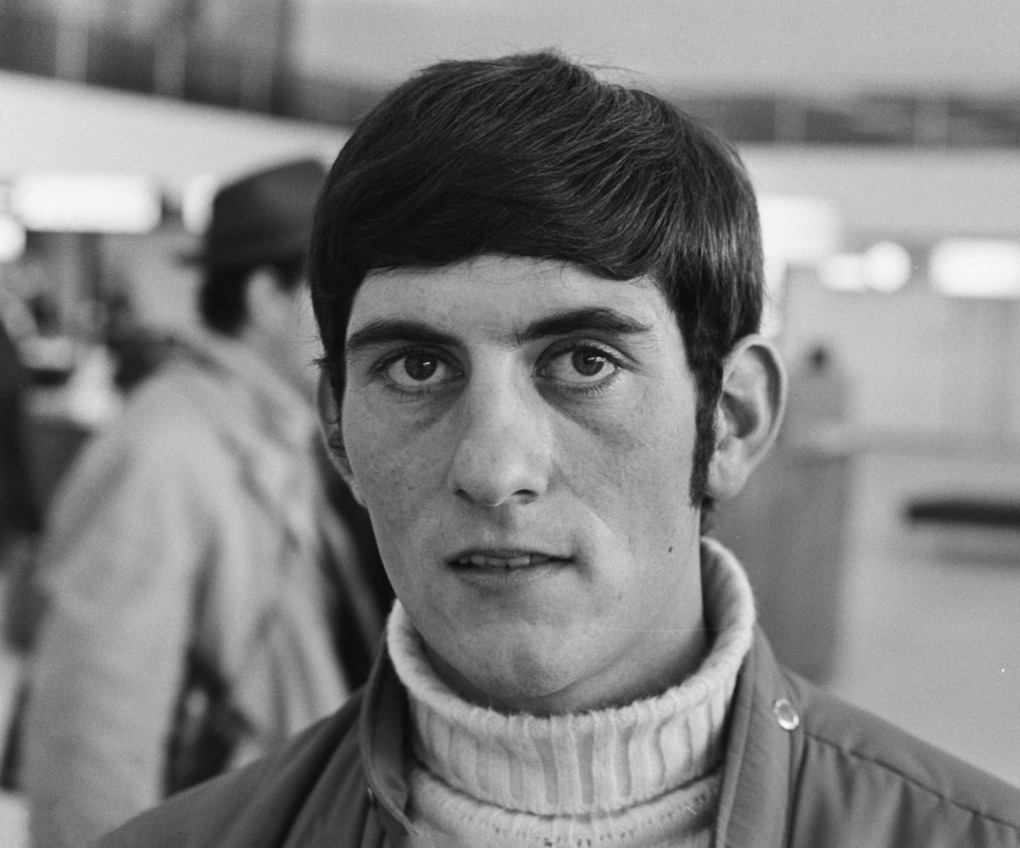
Jan Bazen, 1970

- Jan Bazen (born 1948) former speed skater, competed at the 1976 Winter Olympics
- Brecht Rodenburg (born 1967) retired volleyball player, team gold medallist at the 1996 Summer Olympics
- Sjoert Brink (born 1981) professional bridge player
- Lars Elgersma (born 1983) short and middle distance speed skater
- Ronald Hertog (born 1989) amputee and Paralympic javelin thrower, flag-bearer at the 2012 Summer Paralympics
- Raymond Kreder (born 1989) professional road racing cyclist
- Bastiaan Lijesen (born 1990) swimmer, competed at the 2012 Summer Olympics
- Memphis Depay (born 1994) professional footballer, over 200 club caps
