= Moerkapelle =

Coordinates: 52°03′N 4°35′E

Moerkapelle is a village in the Dutch province of South Holland. It is located about 6 km east of the city of Zoetermeer, in the municipality of Zuidplas.

Moerkapelle was a separate municipality between 1817 and 1991, when it merged with Zevenhuizen, to create a new municipality originally called "Moerhuizen". In 1992, it changed its name to Zevenhuizen-Moerkapelle.

Its name is derived from the combination of moeras (swamp) and kapel (chapel).

== History ==
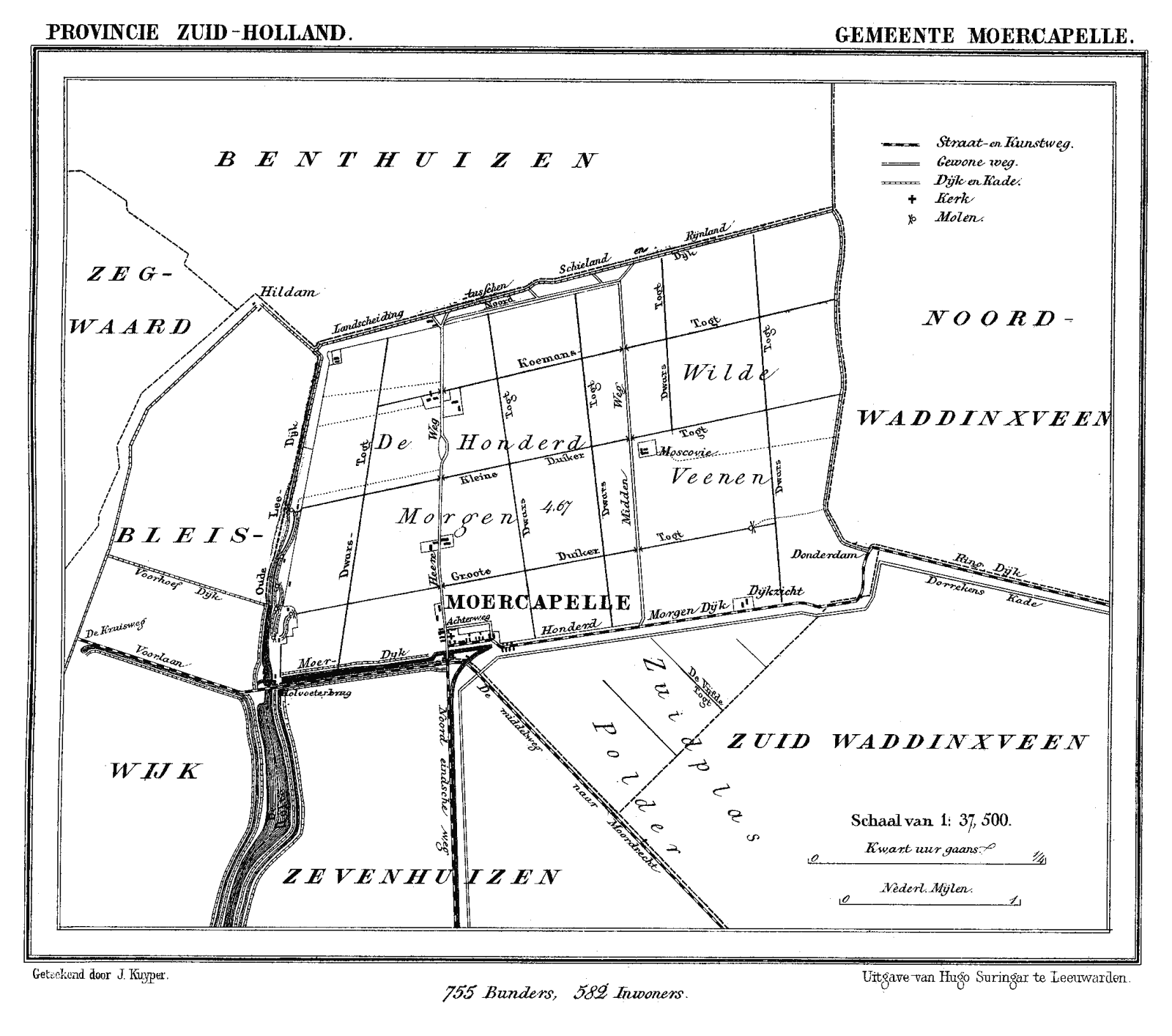
Moerkapelle in 1865

The hamlet Op Moer formed circa 1400. Around 1560 the first reference was made to the existence of a chapel, which served as a school and farmhouse after the completion of the village church in 1667. After the formation of the polder "Wildeveenen" in the 17th century, agricultural activity began and led to a population increase in Moerkapelle.
