= Nieuwerkerk aan den IJssel =

- Town
- Flag Coat of arms
- Interactive map of Nieuwerkerk aan den IJssel
- Coordinates: 51.97°N 4.61°E
- Country: Netherlands
- Province: South Holland
- Municipality: Zuidplas
- Source: CBS, Statline.
- Time zone: UTC+1 (CET)
  - Summer (DST): UTC+2 (CEST)
- Website: www.zuidplas.nl

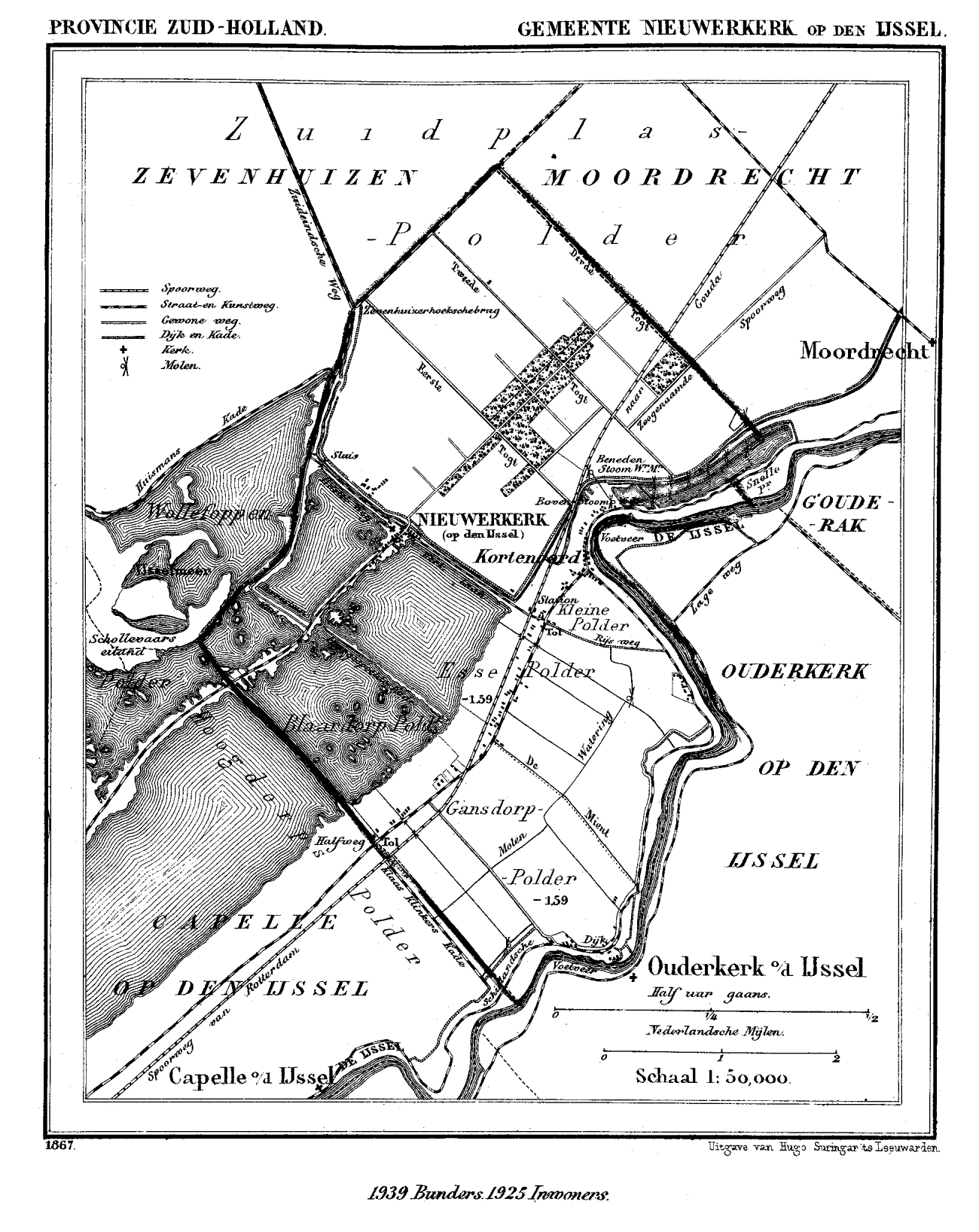
Nieuwerkerk aan den IJssel in 1867.

Nieuwerkerk aan den IJssel (Dutch pronunciation: [ˈniu.ərˌkɛr(ə)k aːn də(n) ˈɛisəl]; population: 22,344 in 2004) is a town and former municipality in the western Netherlands, in the province of South Holland. Since 2010 it is part of the new municipality of Zuidplas.

It is situated along the Hollandsche IJssel river, across from the town Ouderkerk aan den IJssel.

Within the boundaries of this municipality lies the lowest point of the Netherlands: 6.76 m (22.2 ft) below Amsterdam Ordnance Datum (mean summer sea level in Amsterdam). It is the hometown of Miss Universe 1989, Angela Visser.

== History ==
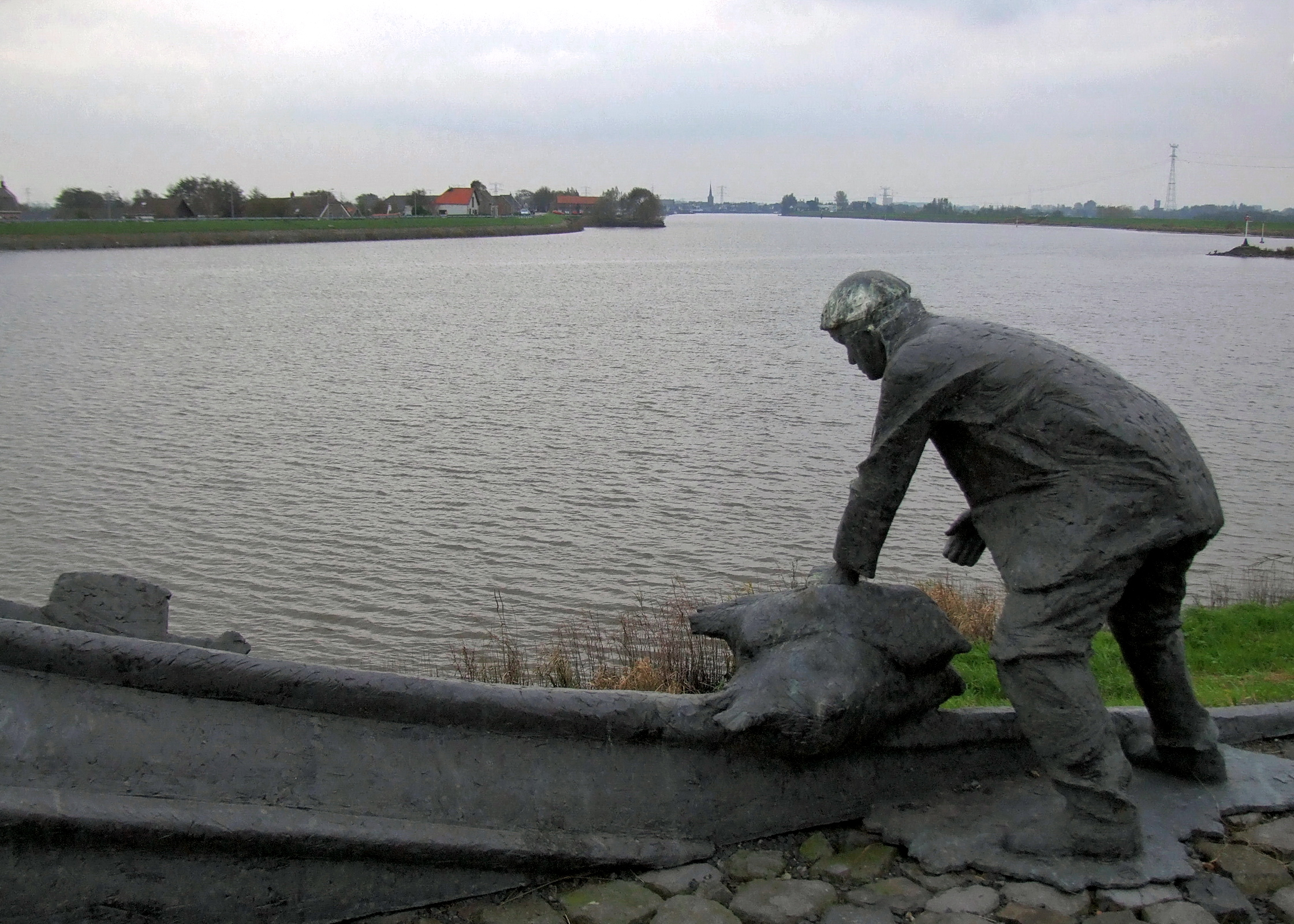
Monument to the plugging of the dike hole by skipper Evegroen during the North Sea Flood of 1953

Nieuwerkerk was probably first formed circa 1250. The first reference to "Nuwekerke" is from 1282 when Count Floris V loaned the land between Kralingen and Gouda to a certain Traveys of Moordrecht. Another reference is from 22 January 1317 when Count William III of Holland sold the fiefdoms Capelle and Nieuwerkerk to John III van de Werve, Lord of Hovorst for 325 Dutch Pounds.

The original old village formed on a mount between shallow lakes. These lakes were the result of peat harvesting. In 1839 the first one was drained and made into a polder, the current Zuidplaspolder, and in 1866, the Alexanderpolder was made.

The railway between Rotterdam and Gouda was built in 1855 and resulted in the growth of the village. Other periods of rapid development followed after the Second World War and in the early 1980s.

During the North Sea Flood of 1953, a dike along that river broke, and the mayor of Nieuwerkerk successfully managed to plug the hole by ordering shipper Arie Evegroen to navigate his grain barge Twee Gebroeders (Two Brothers) into it.

== Transport ==
- Railway station: Nieuwerkerk aan den IJssel
