= Noordkaap (Netherlands) =

Point in Eemsmond, Netherlands

- Cape
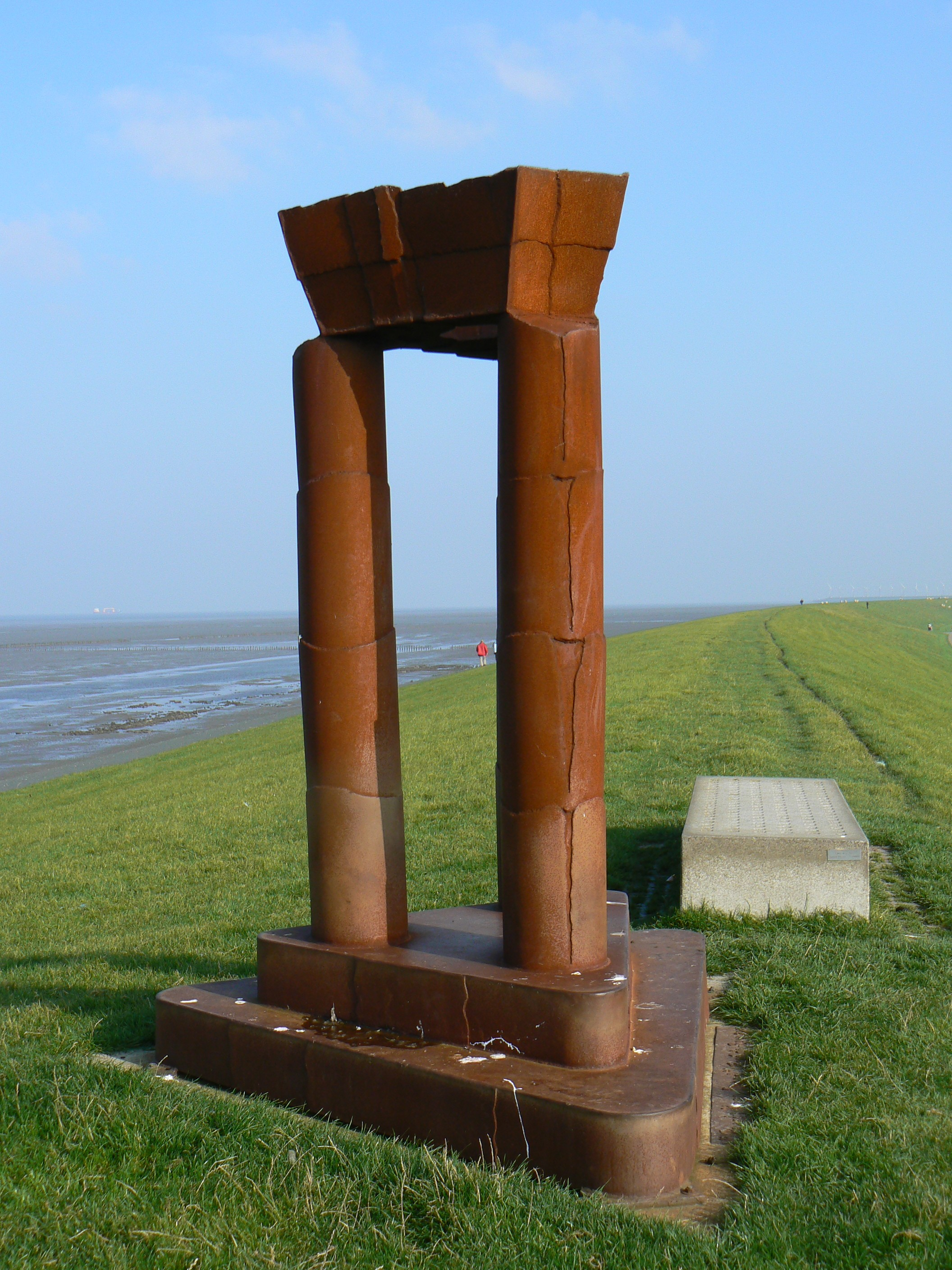
- De Hemelpoort/Poort Kaap Noord

- Coordinates: 53.465278°N 6.745556°E
- Location: Eemshaven, Het Hogeland, Groningen
- Website: Official website

Noordkaap (North Cape) is the northernmost point of mainland Netherlands.

The Noordkaap is located on the north side of the Emmapolder, on the edge of the municipality Het Hogeland in the province of Groningen. It is only accessible on foot or by bicycle.

To mark the spot and attract more tourists, the then municipality of Eemsmond had the artwork 'Poort Kaap Noord', colloquially known as 'De Hemelpoort', (made in 2001) by artist René de Boer placed in 2002. The name 'Noordkaap' was coined at the same time as the artwork was placed. The spot itself is not easily recognizable as an 'extreme point' because the sea dike has a gentle curve.

== Gallery ==
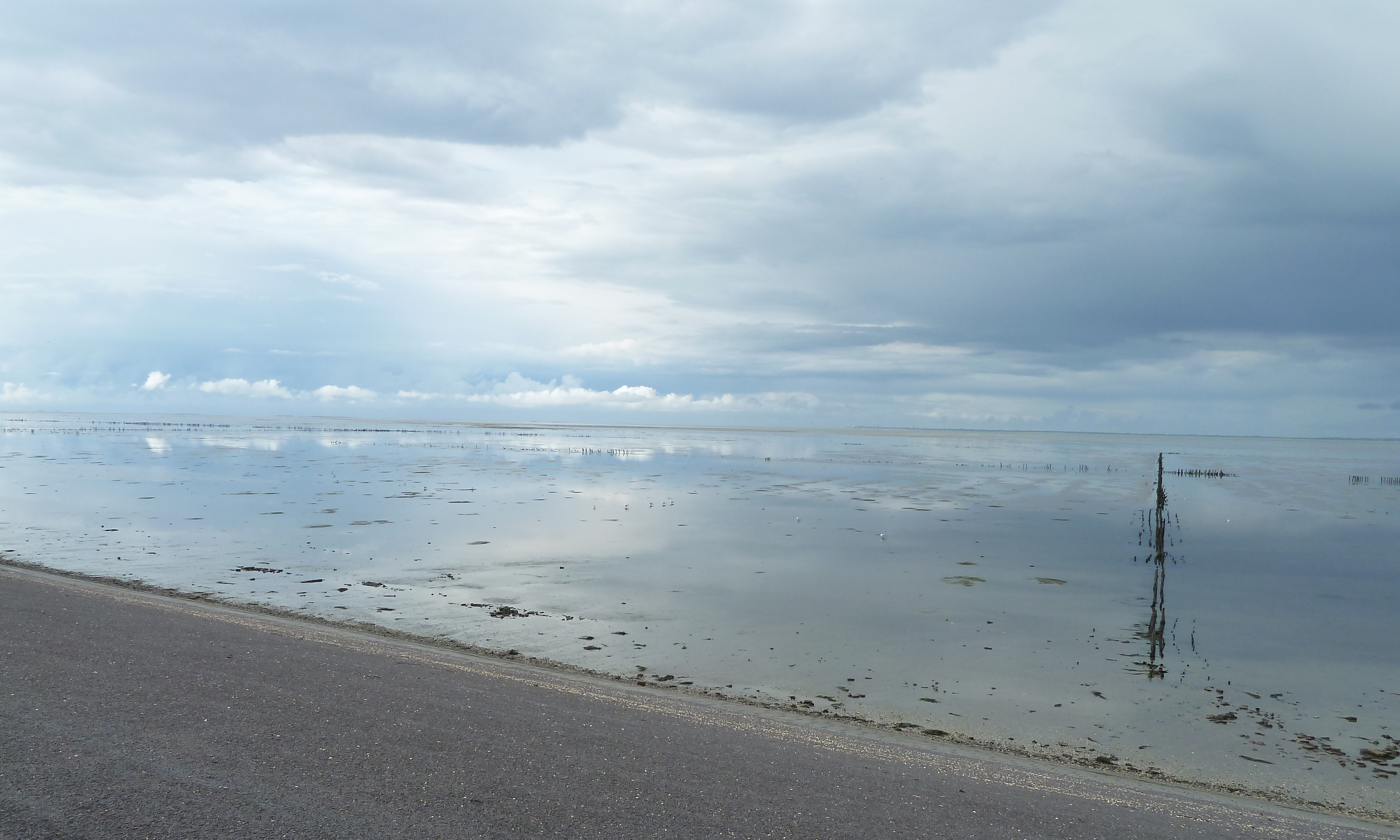
Panorama from the artwork on the Wadden Sea

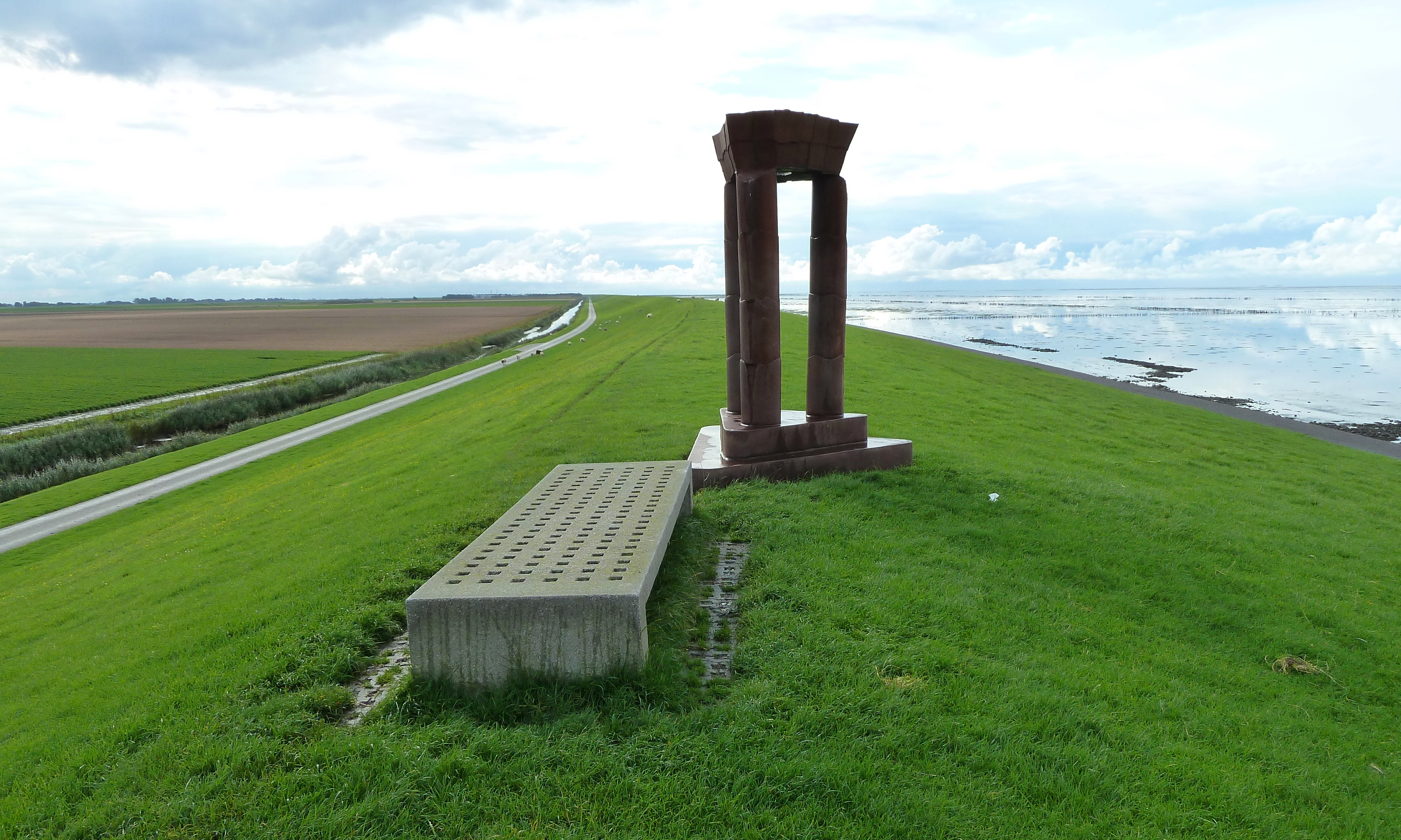
View looking west

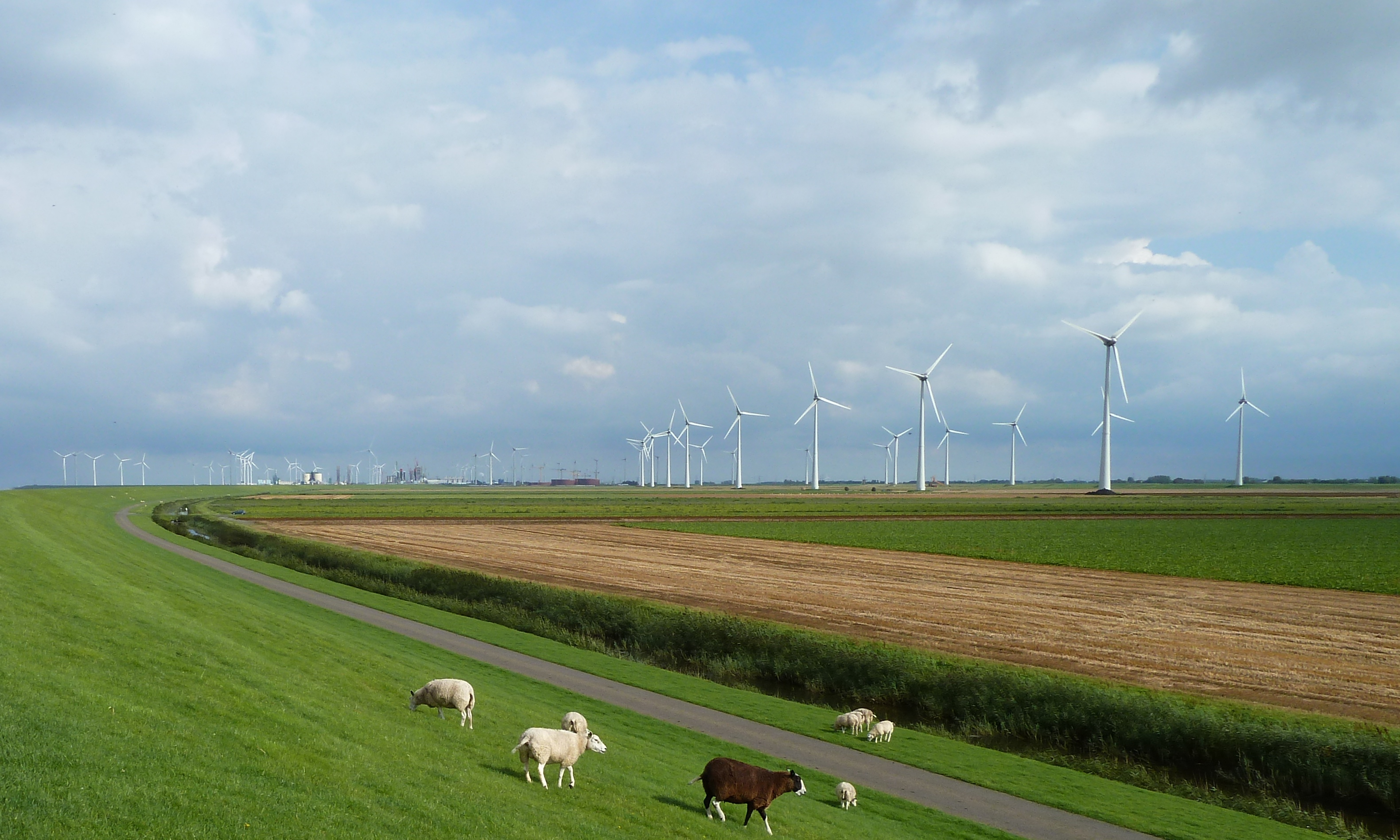
View looking east (Eemshaven)

== See also ==
- List of extreme points of the Netherlands
- Extreme points of Earth
- Geography of the Netherlands
