= South Holland (disambiguation) =

South Holland is a province of the Netherlands.

South Holland may also refer to:

- Southern Netherlands, see Geography of the Netherlands.
- South Holland District, a local government district in Lincolnshire, England
- South Holland and The Deepings (UK Parliament constituency), a constituency in the British House of Commons
- South Holland, Illinois, a village in Illinois, United States
