= List of extreme points of the Netherlands =

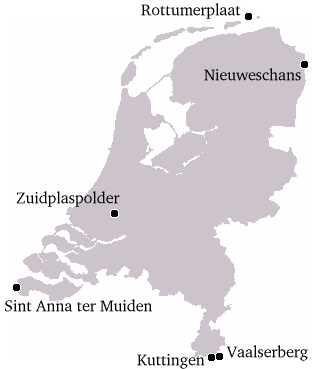
Extreme points of the European part of the Netherlands

This is a list of the extreme points of the Netherlands, the points that are farther up, down, north, south, east or west than any other location.

== European part of the Netherlands ==
- Northernmost Point — Rottumerplaat (53°33′18″N 6°28′41″E)
- Northernmost Point (mainland) — Noordkaap (53.465278°N 6.745556°E)
- Southernmost Point — boundary marker 12 along Rue de Beusdael, near Kuttingen in the municipality of Gulpen-Wittem, Limburg (50°45′01.5″N 5°54′54.0″E)
- Westernmost Point — Sint Anna ter Muiden (51°18′57″N 3°21′30″E)
- Easternmost Point — Bad Nieuweschans (53°10′49″N 7°13′40″E)
- Highest Point — Vaalserberg (327.5 m above sea level) (50°45′17″N 6°01′15″E)
- Lowest point — Zuidplaspolder near Nieuwerkerk aan den IJssel (6.76 m below sea level) (51°59′09″N 4°37′54″E)

== Netherlands ==
When in the list above the special municipalities in the Caribbean are included, the western- and southernmost points change to locations on the island Bonaire, whereas the highest point is on the island Saba. The approximate locations are:

- Westernmost Point — west of Lake Goto (12°17′2″N 68°24′52″W)
- Southernmost Point — Willemstoren Lighthouse Bonaire (12°1′26″N 68°14′52″W)
- Highest Point — Mount Scenery (870 m above sea level) (17°38′06″N 63°14′21″W)

== Kingdom of the Netherlands ==
When all countries of the Kingdom of the Netherlands are taken into account, the southernmost point moves to Curaçao and the westernmost point moves to Aruba.

- Southernmost Point — Klein Curaçao, Curaçao (11°58′42″N 68°38′37″W)
- Westernmost Point — Divi village, Aruba (12°32′24″N 70°3′48″W)

== See also ==
- Extreme points of Earth
- Geography of the Netherlands

== Gallery ==
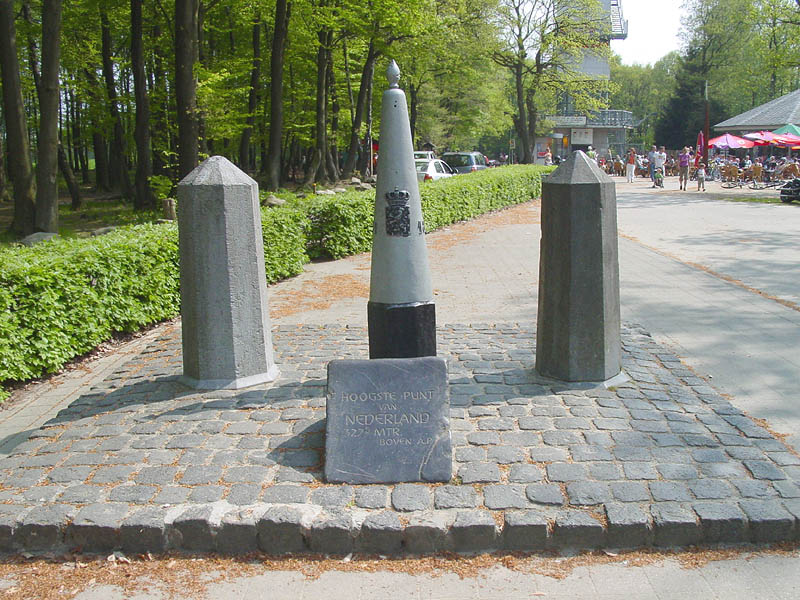
Highest point in the European Netherlands at the summit of Vaalserberg.

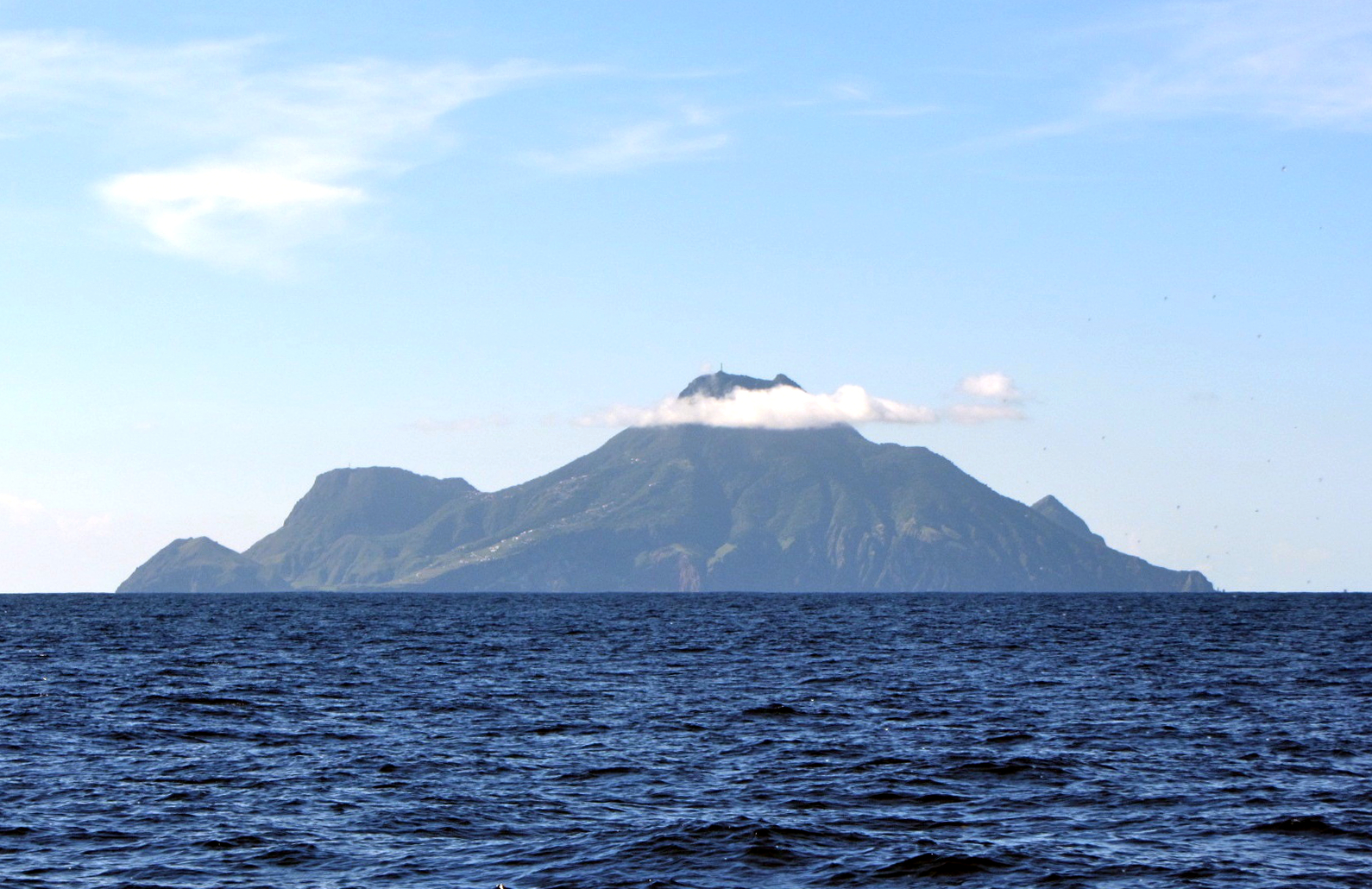
Mount Scenery on Saba in the Caribbean Netherlands is the highest point in the entire Kingdom of the Netherlands.

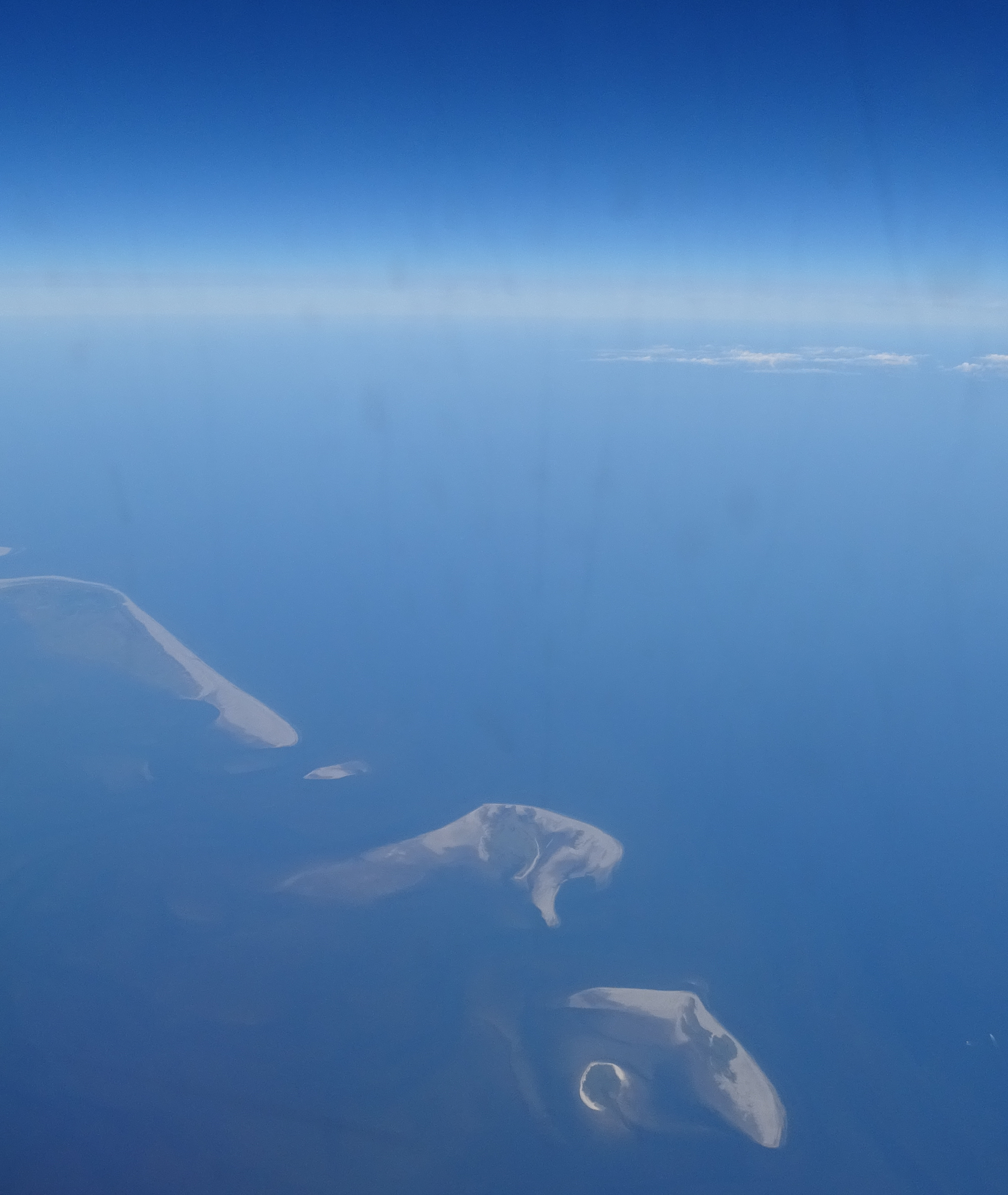
The northern point of Rottumerplaat (middle island, extension to the right of the picture) is the northernmost point of the European and the entire Kingdom of the Netherlands.

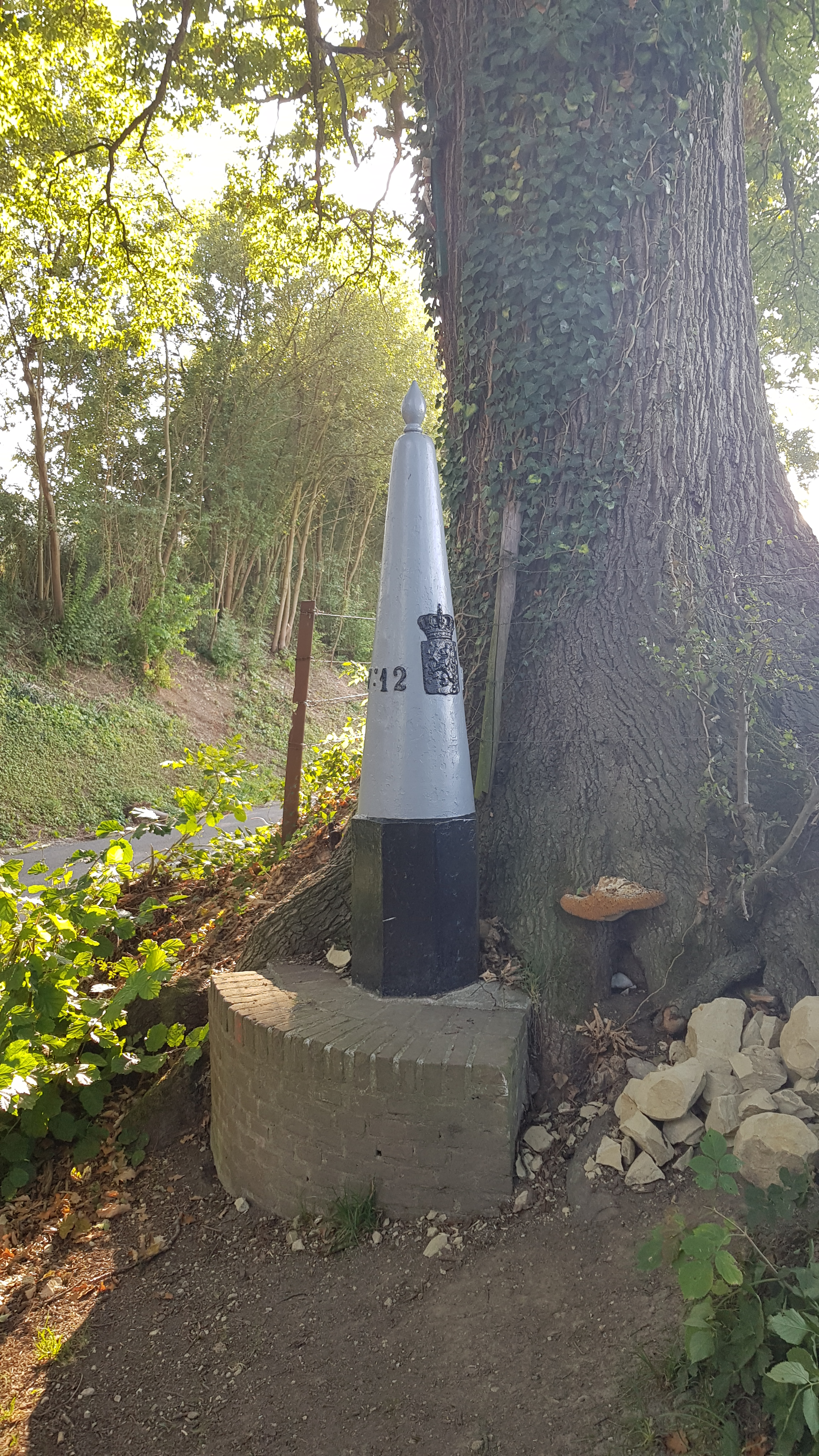
Southernmost point of the European Netherlands, with the border making almost a 90-degree turn running to the right and to the front of Boundary Pillar No. 12.

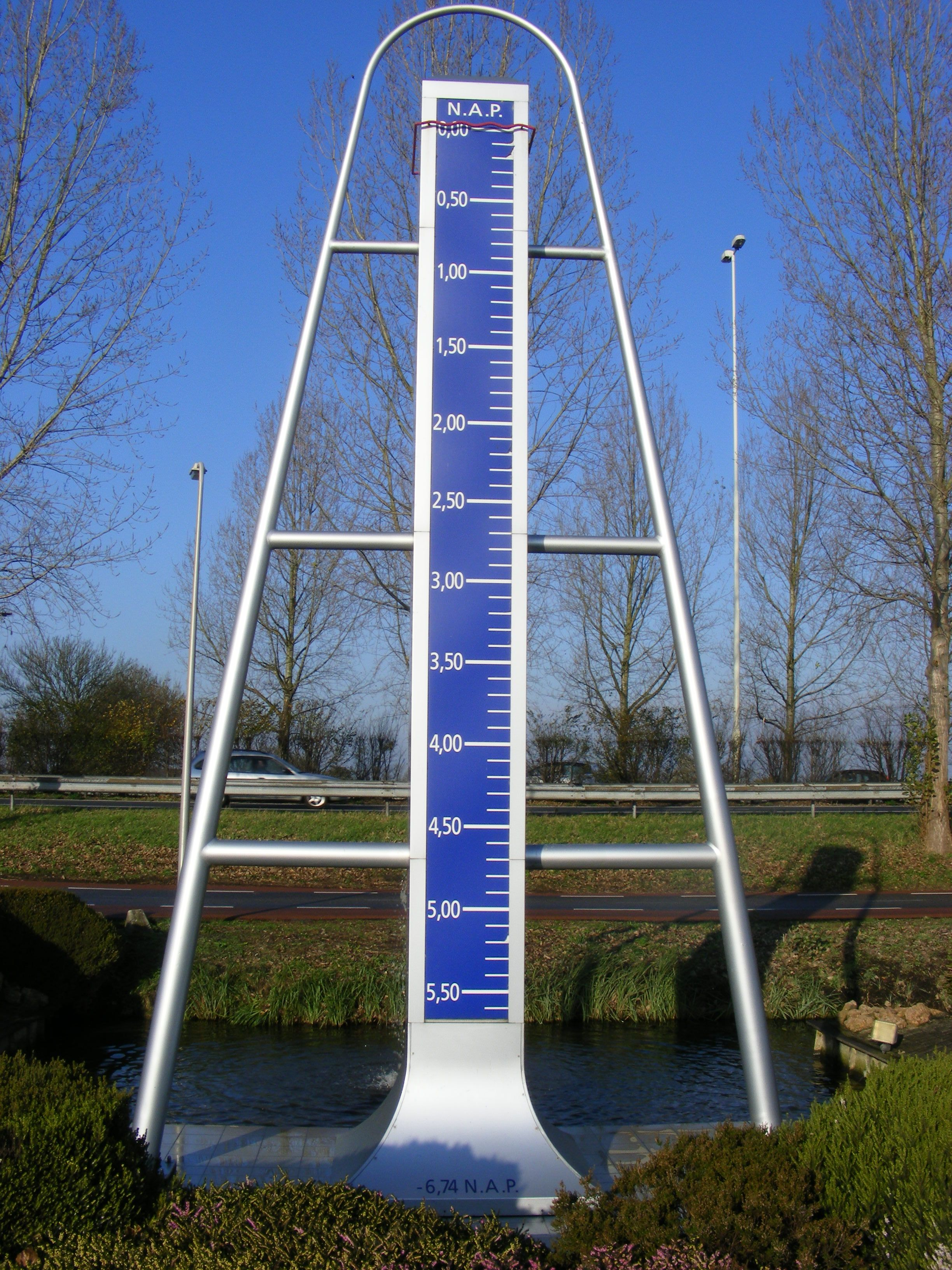
Lowest point of the Netherlands in the Zuidplaspolder
