= Geography of the Netherlands =

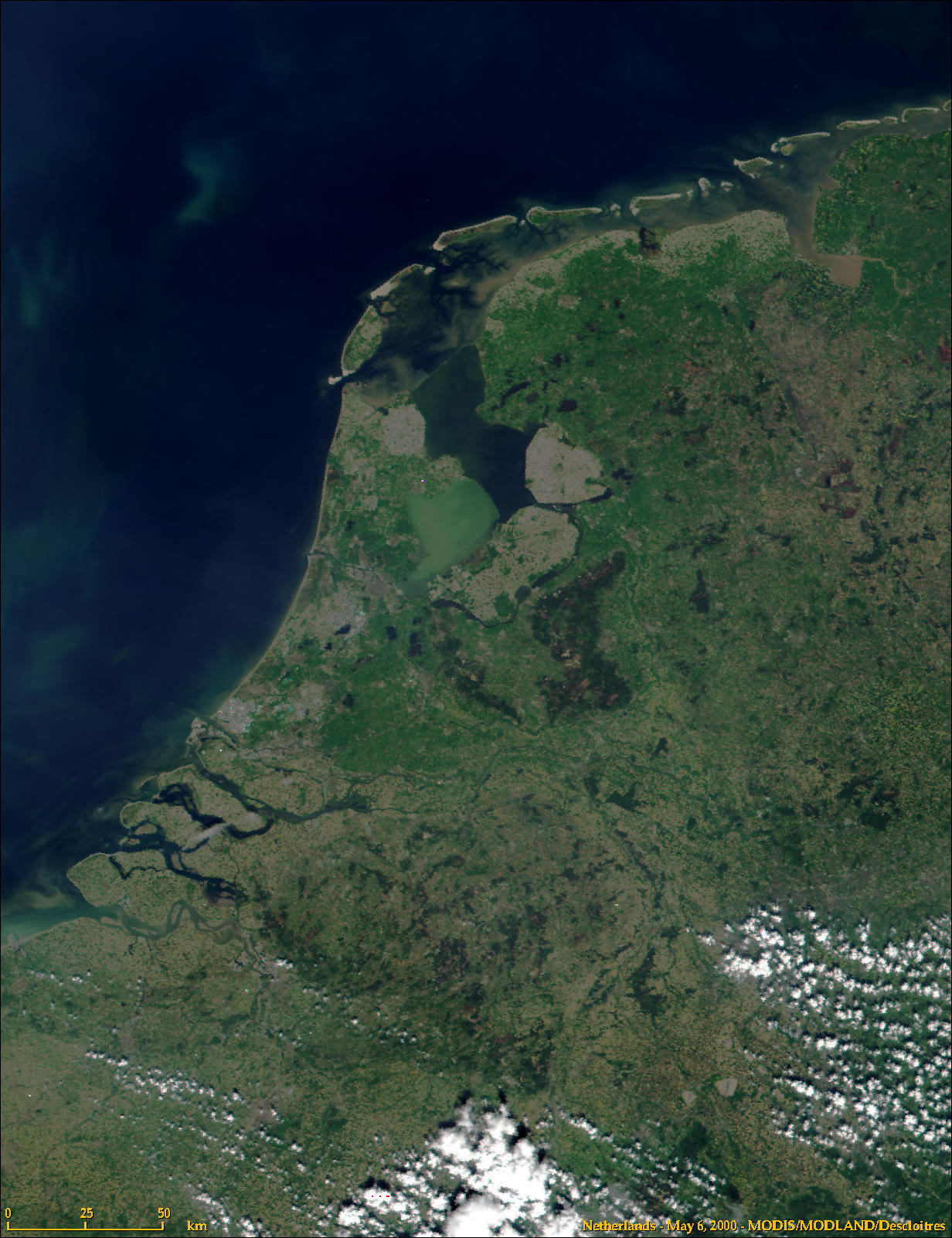
- Continent: Europe
- Region: Western Europe
- Coordinates: 52°22′N 4°53′E
- Area: Ranked 131st
  - Total: 41,545 km^{2} (16,041 sq mi)
  - Land: 80.59%
  - Water: 19.41%
- Coastline: 451 km (280 mi)
- Borders: Total land borders: 1,027 km (638 mi)
- Highest point: Vaalserberg; 322.7 m (1,059 ft)
- Lowest point: Zuidplaspolder (Nieuwerkerk aan den IJssel) −7 m (−23 ft)
- Longest river: Rhine; 764 km (475 mi)
- Largest lake: IJsselmeer; 1,100 km^{2} (420 mi^{2})
- Exclusive economic zone: 154,011 km^{2} (59,464 mi^{2})

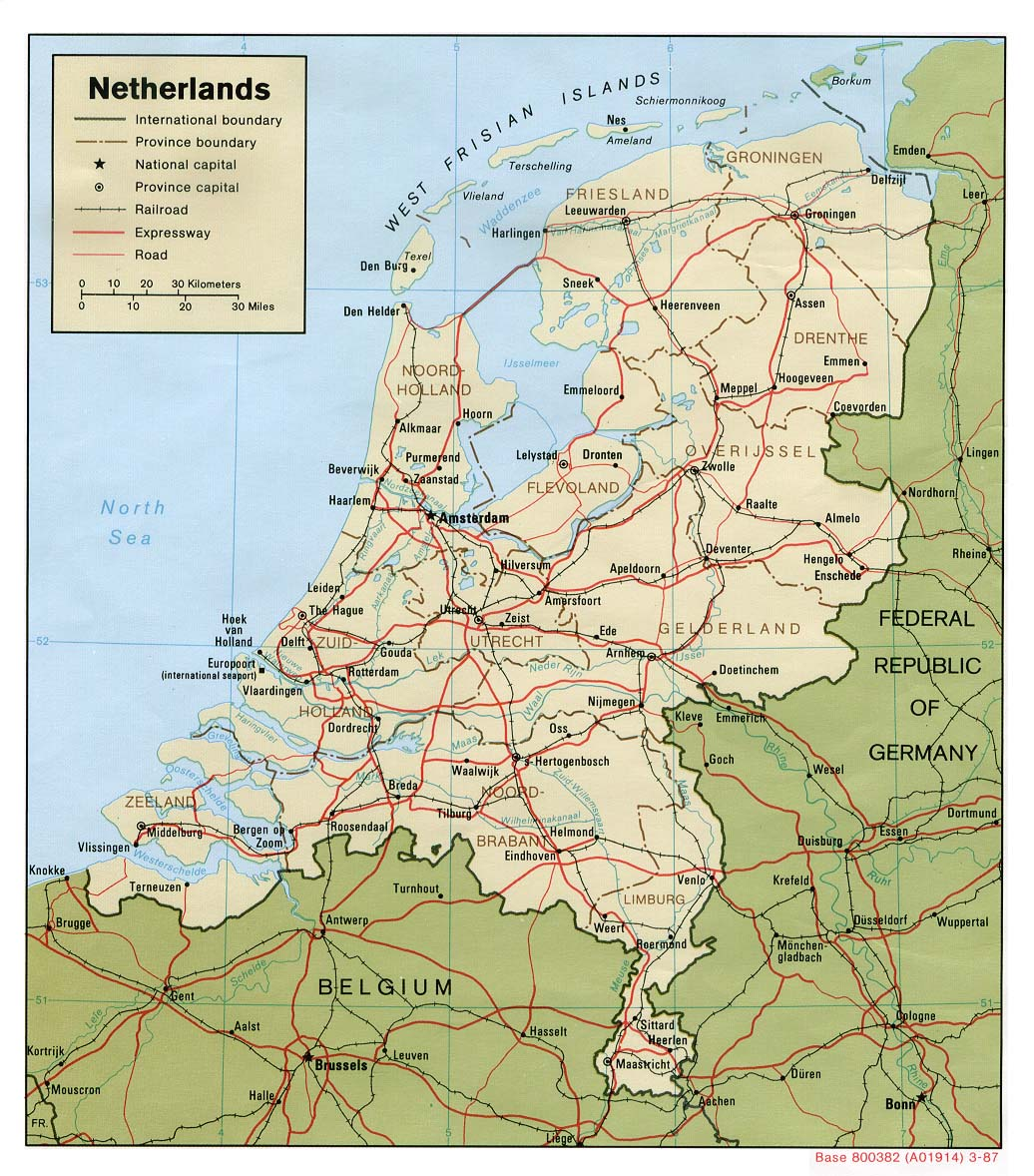
Map of the Netherlands in Europe

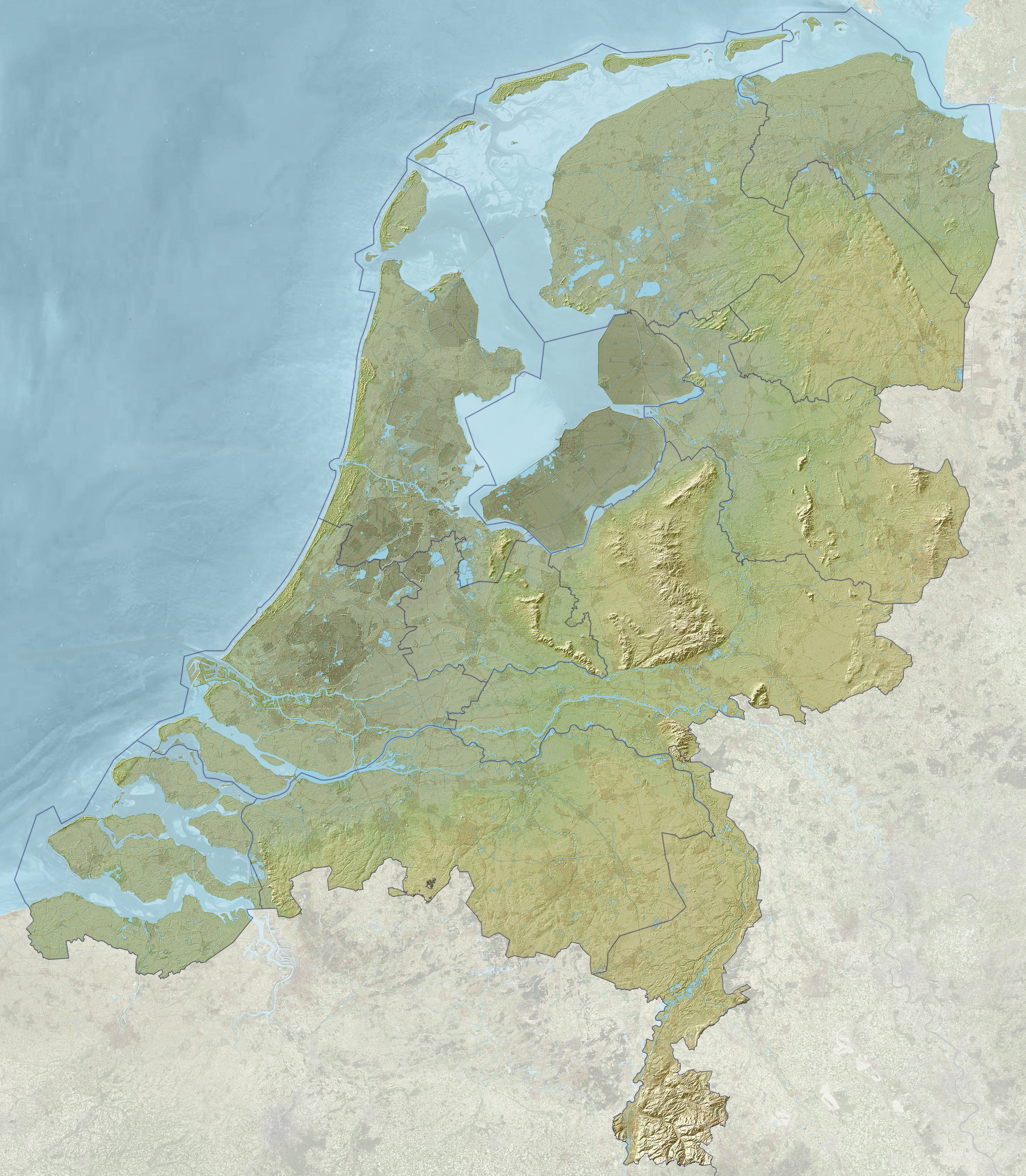
Relief map of the Netherlands in Europe

The geography of the European Netherlands is unusual in that much of its land has been reclaimed from the sea and is below sea level, protected by dikes. It is a small country with a total area of 41,545 km^{2} (16,041 sq mi) and ranked 131st. With a population of 17.4 million and density of 521/km^{2} (1,350/sq mi) makes it the second most densely populated member of the European Union after Malta, and the 12th most densely populated country in the world, behind only three countries with a population over 16 million. Consequently, the Netherlands is highly urbanized, concentrated in the so-called Randstad which makes up 20% of the land area but almost half of the total population.

== Statistics ==
Geographic coordinates: 52°22′N 4°53′E

The Dutch RD coordinate system (Rijksdriehoeksmeting) is also in common use. For transformation to and from geographical coordinates there is an official procedure RDNAPTRANS and approximate as well as precise tools available. The west–east coordinate is between 0 and 280 km, and the south–north coordinate between 300 and 620 km.

The central point is the Onze-Lieve-Vrouwentoren (Our Lady's Tower) in Amersfoort, with RD coordinates (155,000.00, 463,000.00 m) and geographic coordinates approximately 52°9′N 5°23′E.

Area:
total: 41,545 km^{2} (16,041 sq mi)
land: 33,481 km^{2} (12,927 sq mi)
water: 8,064 km^{2} (3,114 sq mi)

Land boundaries:
total: 1,027 km (638 mi)
border countries:

- Belgium 450 km (280 mi)
- Germany 577 km (359 mi)

Coastline: 451 km (280 mi)

Maritime claims:
territorial sea: 12 nmi (22.2 km; 13.8 mi)
contiguous zone: 24 nmi (44.4 km; 27.6 mi)
exclusive economic zone: 154,011 km^{2} (59,464 mi^{2}) with 200 nmi (370.4 km; 230.2 mi)

Climate: temperate; marine; cool summers and mild winters (European mainland), tropical (Caribbean islands)

Terrain: mostly coastal lowland and reclaimed land (polders); some hills in southeast

Hypsometric curve of the Netherlands in Europe. The land is unusually low and significant portions lie below mean sea level.

Elevation extremes:
lowest point: Zuidplaspolder (Nieuwerkerk aan den IJssel) −7 m (−23 ft), below sea level.
highest point on European mainland: Vaalserberg 322.7 m (1,059 ft) above sea level.
highest point (including the Caribbean islands): Mount Scenery on Saba 870 m (2,850 ft) above sea level.

Natural resources: natural gas, petroleum, peat, limestone, iodised salt, sand and gravel, arable land

Land use: (2011)
arable land: 25.08%
permanent crops: 0.88%
other: 74.04%

Irrigated land (2007): 4,572 km^{2} (1,765 sq mi)

Total renewable water resources (2011): 91 km^{3} (22 cu mi)

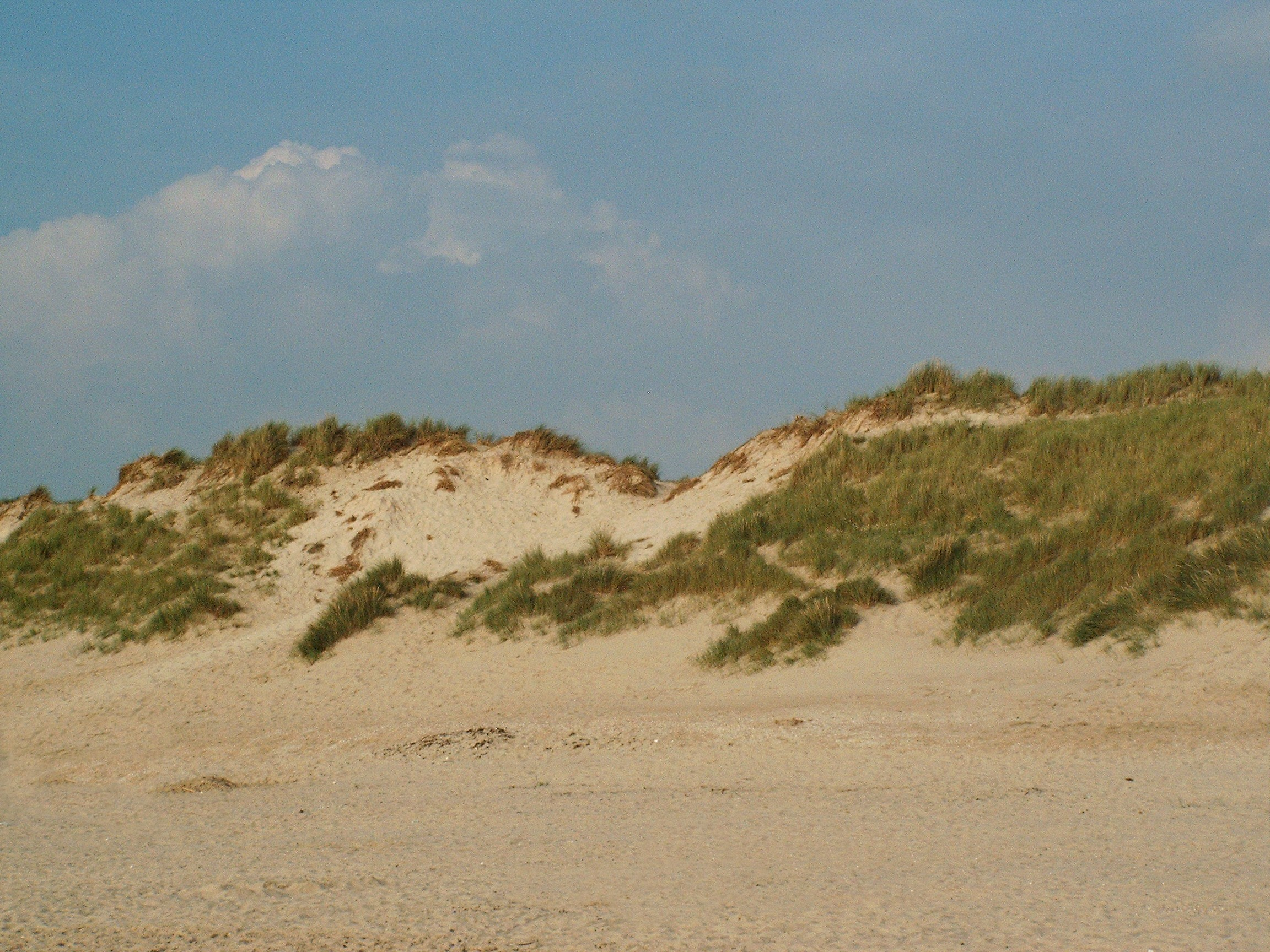
The coastal dunes are vital to the existence of areas of the Netherlands.

Natural hazards: flooding by sea and rivers is a constant danger. The extensive system of dikes, dams, and sand dunes protect nearly one-half of the total area from being flooded during the heavy autumn storms from the north-west.

Environment – current issues: water pollution in the form of heavy metals, organic compounds, and fertilisers such as nitrates and phosphates; air pollution from vehicles and refining activities; acid rain

Environment – international agreements:
party to: Air Pollution, Air Pollution-Nitrogen Oxides, Air Pollution-Persistent Organic Pollutants, Air Pollution-Sulphur 85, Air Pollution-Sulphur 94, Air Pollution-Volatile Organic Compounds, Antarctic-Environmental Protocol, Antarctic Treaty, Biodiversity, Climate Change, Climate Change-Kyoto Protocol, Desertification, Endangered Species, Environmental Modification, Hazardous Wastes, Law of the Sea, Marine Dumping, Marine Life Conservation, Ozone Layer Protection, Ship Pollution, Tropical Timber 83, Tropical Timber 94, Wetlands, Whaling
signed, but not ratified: none

== Landscape ==
The country can be split into two areas: the low and flat lands in the west and north, and the higher lands with minor hills in the east and south. The former, including the reclaimed polders and river deltas, make up about half of its surface area and are less than 1 metre (3.3 ft) above sea level, much of it actually below sea level. These areas were mostly once above sea level but have been sinking an average of one centimeter per year due to natural subsidence, exacerbated by peat extraction. An extensive range of seawalls and coastal dunes protect the Netherlands from the sea, and levees and dikes along the rivers protect against river flooding. A recent global remote sensing analysis suggested that there were 1,025 km^{2} of tidal flats in the Netherlands, making it the 31st ranked country in terms of tidal flat area. The rest of the country is mostly flat; only in the extreme south of the country does the land rise to any significant extent, in the foothills of the Ardennes mountains. This is where Vaalserberg is located, the highest point on the European part of the Netherlands at 322.7 metres (1,059 ft) above sea level. The highest point of the entire country is Mount Scenery (870 metres or 2,854 ft), which is located outside the European part of the Netherlands, on the island of Saba in the Caribbean.

National parks in the Netherlands

The Netherlands is located at mouths of three major European rivers (Rhine, Maas or Meuse, and Scheldt).

In November 2016, the Netherlands and Belgium agreed to cede small, uninhabited parcels of land to reflect a change in course of the river Meuse (or Maas, in Dutch). The land swap is to take effect as of 2018.

== Urbanization ==
The Netherlands does not have a single large metropolis, but the four largest cities are concentrated in the western provinces of North Holland, South Holland, and Utrecht. Between and around these lies a ring of medium-sized towns, which together form the so-called Randstad. About 45% of the Dutch population is concentrated here in this small area (makes up 20% of the total land), around a relatively open space, the so-called Groene Hart (Green Heart). This area is highly densely populated with over 1000 inhabitants per km^{2}. The rest of the country is much less dense. Between 70-85% of the Netherlands total land area is described as rural (Dutch: platteland, landelijk).

=== Largest cities ===
With their provinces in November 2019:

1. Amsterdam (North Holland) 872,680 inhabitants
2. Rotterdam (South Holland) 650,711
3. The Hague ('s-Gravenhage) (South Holland) 544,766
4. Utrecht (Utrecht) 357,179
5. Eindhoven (North Brabant) 234,235

List of metropolitan areas of European Netherlands
Metropolitan area	Core city	Population
Randstad	Amsterdam	8,366,078
Metropolitan Region Rotterdam The Hague	Rotterdam	2,392,289
Amsterdam Transport Region	Amsterdam	1,484,893
Utrecht10	Utrecht	650,000
Brabant city row	Eindhoven	2,145,390
Park city Limburg	Heerlen	255,000
Green Metropolitan Region Arnhem-Nijmegen	Arnhem	738,700
Twente region	Enschede	620,000
Groningen-Assen region	Groningen	500,000
Breda-Tilburg	Tilburg	530,557
Eindhoven Metropolitan Region	Eindhoven	784,369
Brabant Outer Cities and Woensdrecht	Roosendaal	164,838
Amersfoort	Amersfoort	286,053
Apeldoorn	Apeldoorn	212,808
Dordrecht	Dordrecht	283,906
Haarlem	Haarlem	414,491
's-Hertogenbosch	's-Hertogenbosch	194,730
Leeuwarden	Leeuwarden	162,078
Leiden	Leiden	338,356
Maastricht	Maastricht	181,153
Sittard-Geleen	Sittard-Geleen	150,448
Zwolle	Zwolle	178,021

== Ecosystems per province ==
This table describes the size and distributions of ecosystems in the Netherlands in 2021, broken down into 10 ecosystem types and by province. (Source: CBS).

Province	Groningen	Friesland	Drenthe	Overijssel	Flevoland	Gelderland	Utrecht	North-Holland	South-Holland	Zeeland	North-Brabant	Limburg	Total Netherlands
Nature	5,3%	5,6%	24,4%	18,2%	9,7%	25,4%	18,1%	5,6%	8,7%	6,9%	21,0%	22,2%	14,1%
Water and coast	22,4%	45,1%	1,4%	3,1%	41,4%	3,5%	5,3%	38,5%	20,9%	40,9%	3,5%	2,7%	20,1%
Agricultural	55,6%	39,4%	55,7%	56,9%	37,0%	45,5%	45,5%	32,2%	37,5%	40,7%	46,5%	44,5%	44,2%
Built-up	16,7%	9,9%	18,4%	21,9%	12,0%	25,7%	31,2%	23,8%	32,8%	11,6%	29,1%	30,6%	21,5%

Broken down (with surface area (km^{2}))
Province	Groningen	Friesland	Drenthe	Overijssel	Flevoland	Gelderland	Utrecht	North-Holland	South-Holland	Zeeland	North-Brabant	Limburg	Total Netherlands
Forest	2,1% (61 km^{2})	2,1% (122 km^{2})	12,5% (336 km^{2})	10,6% (361 km^{2})	5,6% (136 km^{2})	17,6% (905 km^{2})	11,9% (185 km^{2})	3,2% (131 km^{2})	2,8% (94 km^{2})	1,5% (45 km^{2})	13,1% (667 km^{2})	14,7% (324 km^{2})	8,1% (3367 km^{2})
Open nature	2,2% (66 km^{2})	1,9% (112 km^{2})	7,5% (202 km^{2})	4,7% (161 km^{2})	3,1% (74 km^{2})	7,1% (366 km^{2})	5,3% (83 km^{2})	1,7% (68 km^{2})	4,3% (143 km^{2})	5,1% (149 km^{2})	5,9% (299 km^{2})	5,9% (130 km^{2})	4,5% (1853 km^{2})
Wet areas	1,0% (30 km^{2})	1,6% (91 km^{2})	4,3% (115 km^{2})	2,9% (100 km^{2})	1,0% (23 km^{2})	0,6% (32 km^{2})	0,9% (14 km^{2})	0,7% (29 km^{2})	1,6% (52 km^{2})	0,2% (7 km^{2})	1,9% (99 km^{2})	1,7% (37 km^{2})	1,5% (629 km^{2})
Dunes and beaches	1,2% (36 km^{2})	3,1% (177 km^{2})	0,0% (0 km^{2})	0,0% (0 km^{2})	0,0% (0 km^{2})	0,0% (0 km^{2})	0.0% (0 km^{2})	3,3% (136 km^{2})	2,2% (73 km^{2})	2,1% (62 km^{2})	0,0% (1 km^{2})	0.0% (0 km^{2})	1,2% (485 km^{2})
Water	21,2% (627 km^{2})	42,1% (2420 km^{2})	1,4% (38 km^{2})	3,1% (105 km^{2})	41,4% (998 km^{2})	3,5% (181 km^{2})	5,3% (83 km^{2})	35,2% (1439 km^{2})	18,7% (619 km^{2})	38,8% (1137 km^{2})	3,4% (175 km^{2})	2,7% (59 km^{2})	19,0% (7880 km^{2})
Arable farming	33,3% (983 km^{2})	7,1% (409 km^{2})	31,2% (835 km^{2})	15,0% (513 km^{2})	31,1% (749 km^{2})	14,0% (720 km^{2})	6,6% (103 km^{2})	13,7% (560 km^{2})	14,6% (483 km^{2})	32,6% (957 km^{2})	27,0% (1370 km^{2})	29,4% (649 km^{2})	20,0% (8328 km^{2})
Grassland	22,3% (659 km^{2})	32,2% (1853 km^{2})	24,4% (655 km^{2})	41,8% (1429 km^{2})	5,7% (137 km^{2})	31,2% (1601 km^{2})	38,7% (604 km^{2})	17,9% (731 km^{2})	20,4% (676 km^{2})	7,9% (231 km^{2})	18,9% (961 km^{2})	14,3% (315 km^{2})	23,7% (9851 km^{2})
Intensive horticulture	0,0% (1 km^{2})	0,0% (2 km^{2})	0,1% (4 km^{2})	0,1% (3 km^{2})	0,2% (6 km^{2})	0,3% (15 km^{2})	0,2% (3 km^{2})	0,6% (26 km^{2})	2,5% (83 km^{2})	0,2% (5 km^{2})	0,6% (31 km^{2})	0,9% (19 km^{2})	0,5% (198 km^{2})
Living, economy and infrastructure	14,5% (429 km^{2})	9,1% (524 km^{2})	16,9% (452 km^{2})	20,3% (695 km^{2})	9,9% (238 km^{2})	23,1% (1186 km^{2})	27,9% (436 km^{2})	20,7% (845 km^{2})	28,5% (942 km^{2})	10,5% (307 km^{2})	26,3% (1338 km^{2})	28,6% (632 km^{2})	19,3% (8023 km^{2})
Public green areas	2,2% (64 km^{2})	0,7% (43 km^{2})	1,6% (42 km^{2})	1,6% (54 km^{2})	2,2% (52 km^{2})	2,6% (132 km^{2})	3,3% (51 km^{2})	3,1% (127 km^{2})	4,3% (143 km^{2})	1,2% (34 km^{2})	2,8% (141 km^{2})	2,0% (45 km^{2})	2,2% (927 km^{2})

== Climate ==
The predominant wind direction in the European Netherlands is southwest, which causes a mild maritime climate, with moderately warm summers and cool winters, and typically high humidity. This is especially true close to the Dutch coastline, where the difference in temperature between summer and winter, as well as between day and night is noticeably smaller than it is in the southeast of the country.

Ice days—maximum temperature below 0 °C (32 °F)—usually occur from December until February, with the occasional rare ice day prior to or after that period. Freezing days—minimum temperature below 0 °C (32 °F)—occur much more often, usually ranging from mid-November to late March, but not rarely measured as early as mid-October and as late as mid-May. If one chooses the height of measurement to be 10 cm (4 in) above ground instead of 150 cm (59 in), one may even find such temperatures in the middle of the summer. On average, snow can occur from November to April but sometimes occurs in May or October too.

Warm days—maximum temperature above 20 °C (68 °F)—are usually found in April to October, but in some parts of the country these warm days can also occur in March, or even sometimes in November or February (usually not in De Bilt, however). Summer days—maximum temperature above 25 °C (77 °F)—are usually measured in De Bilt from May until September, tropical days—maximum temperature above 30 °C (86 °F)—are rare and usually occur only in June to August.

Precipitation throughout the year is distributed relatively equally each month. Summer and autumn months tend to gather a little more precipitation than the other months, mainly because of the intensity of the rainfall rather than the frequency of rain days (this is especially the case in summer when lightning is also much more frequent).

The number of sunshine hours is affected by the fact that because of the geographical latitude, the length of the days varies between barely eight hours in December and nearly 17 hours in June.

The following table is based on mean measurements by the KNMI weather station in De Bilt between 1991 and 2020. The highest recorded temperature was 40.7 °C (105.3 °F), reached on 25 July 2019 in Gilze-Rijen. The lowest temperature in the Netherlands was recorded at Winterswijk on 27 January 1942, when the temperature dropped to −27.4 °C (−17.3 °F).

Climate data for De Bilt (1991–2020 averages), all KNMI locations (1901–2021 extremes), snowy days: (2003-2020 averages).
Month	Jan	Feb	Mar	Apr	May	Jun	Jul	Aug	Sep	Oct	Nov	Dec	Year
Record high °C (°F)	16.5 (61.7)	20.5 (68.9)	26.1 (79.0)	32.2 (90.0)	35.6 (96.1)	37.2 (99.0)	40.7 (105.3)	37.8 (100.0)	35.1 (95.2)	30.1 (86.2)	22.0 (71.6)	16.7 (62.1)	40.7 (105.3)
Mean daily maximum °C (°F)	6.1 (43.0)	7.0 (44.6)	10.5 (50.9)	14.8 (58.6)	18.3 (64.9)	20.9 (69.6)	23.1 (73.6)	22.9 (73.2)	19.5 (67.1)	14.8 (58.6)	9.9 (49.8)	6.7 (44.1)	14.5 (58.1)
Daily mean °C (°F)	3.6 (38.5)	3.9 (39.0)	6.5 (43.7)	9.8 (49.6)	13.4 (56.1)	16.2 (61.2)	18.3 (64.9)	17.9 (64.2)	14.7 (58.5)	10.9 (51.6)	7.0 (44.6)	4.2 (39.6)	10.5 (50.9)
Mean daily minimum °C (°F)	0.9 (33.6)	0.7 (33.3)	2.4 (36.3)	4.5 (40.1)	8.0 (46.4)	10.8 (51.4)	13.0 (55.4)	12.5 (54.5)	10.0 (50.0)	7.1 (44.8)	3.9 (39.0)	1.6 (34.9)	6.0 (42.8)
Record low °C (°F)	−27.4 (−17.3)	−26.8 (−16.2)	−20.7 (−5.3)	−9.4 (15.1)	−5.4 (22.3)	−1.2 (29.8)	0.7 (33.3)	1.3 (34.3)	−3.7 (25.3)	−8.5 (16.7)	−14.4 (6.1)	−22.3 (−8.1)	−27.4 (−17.3)
Average precipitation mm (inches)	70.8 (2.79)	63.1 (2.48)	57.8 (2.28)	41.6 (1.64)	59.3 (2.33)	70.5 (2.78)	85.2 (3.35)	83.6 (3.29)	77.9 (3.07)	81.1 (3.19)	80.0 (3.15)	83.8 (3.30)	854.7 (33.65)
Average precipitation days (≥ 0.1 mm)	18	16	15	12	14	14	15	15	14	16	19	19	186
Average snowy days (≥ 0 cm)	5	6	3	0	0	—	—	—	—	0	1	4	19
Average relative humidity (%)	87	84	79	74	74	75	77	79	83	86	89	89	81
Mean monthly sunshine hours	66.6	89.6	139.4	189.2	217.5	207.1	213.9	196.3	152.8	119.3	67.4	55.5	1,714.6
Source: KNMI.nl

== See also ==
- List of islands of the Netherlands
- List of places in the Netherlands
- List of mountains and hills in the Netherlands
- List of volcanoes in the Netherlands
- Extreme points of the Netherlands
