= List of volcanoes in the Netherlands =

This is a list of active and extinct volcanoes in the Netherlands.

Name	Elevation		Location coordinates	Last eruption
Name	metres	feet	Location coordinates	Last eruption
Mount Scenery (Note: Located in the Caribbean Netherlands.)	870	2,854	17.63549°N 63.23722°W	1640 CE
Mulciber	–	–	54.061°N 4.282°E	150 Ma ago
The Quill	601	1,971	17.478°N 62.960°W	250 CE
Zuidwal volcano	–	–	53.13°N 5.11°E	160 Ma ago

== See also ==
- List of mountains and hills in the Netherlands
