= List of mountains and hills in the Netherlands =

The following is a list of mountains and hills in the Netherlands.

== European Netherlands ==
- Cauberg (134 metres; 440 ft)
- Eyserbosweg (193 metres; 633 ft)
- Keutenberg (163 metres; 535 ft)
- Mount Saint Peter (171 metres; 561 ft)
- Vaalserberg (322.4 metres; 1,058 ft)
- Vrouwenheide (211 metres; 692 ft)

== See also ==
- List of volcanoes in the Netherlands
