= Altena, North Brabant =

Altena
- Municipality
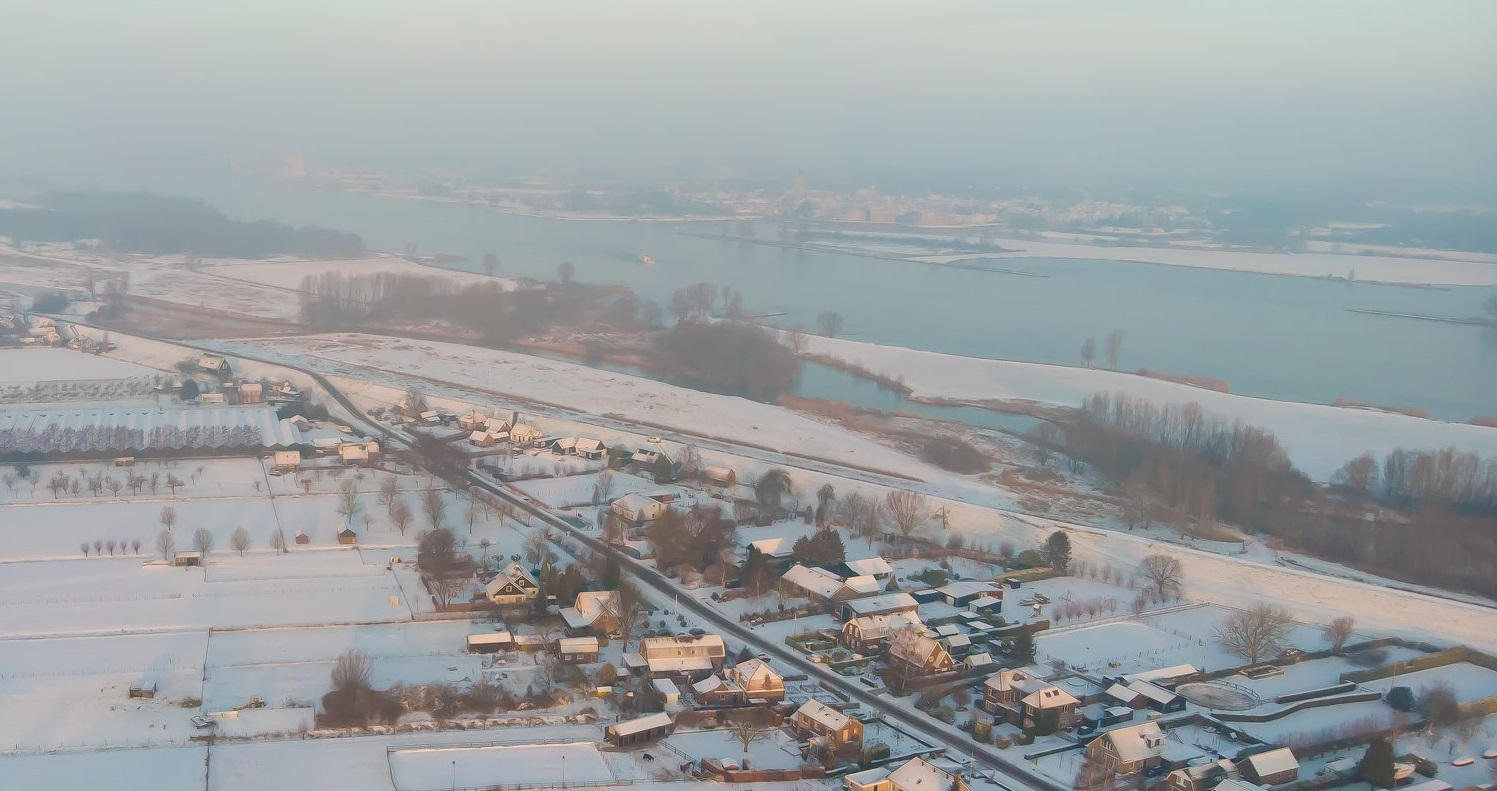
- Snowy view of Altena near the Boven Merwede

- Flag Coat of arms

- Location in North Brabant
- Coordinates: 51°46′N 4°58′E
- Country: Netherlands
- Province: North Brabant
- Established: 1 January 2019

Government
  - Body: Municipal council
  - Mayor: Egbert Lichtenberg (CDA)

Area
  - Total: 226.64 km^{2} (87.51 sq mi)
  - Land: 200.63 km^{2} (77.46 sq mi)
  - Water: 26.02 km^{2} (10.05 sq mi)

Population (July 2019)
  - Total: 55,718
  - Density: 277.72/km^{2} (719.28/sq mi)
- Time zone: UTC+1 (CET)
  - Summer (DST): UTC+2 (CEST)
- Website: www.gemeentealtena.nl

Altena is a municipality in the Netherlands, on a river island in the very north of the province of North Brabant, bordering the provinces of Gelderland and South Holland. Nearby cities are Dordrecht in the west, Gorinchem in the north (both in South Holland), and Waalwijk in the south.

Approximately 56,000 people live in an area of about 201 km², making Altena the largest municipality of North Brabant in terms of land area (surpassing Meierijstad).

== Geography ==
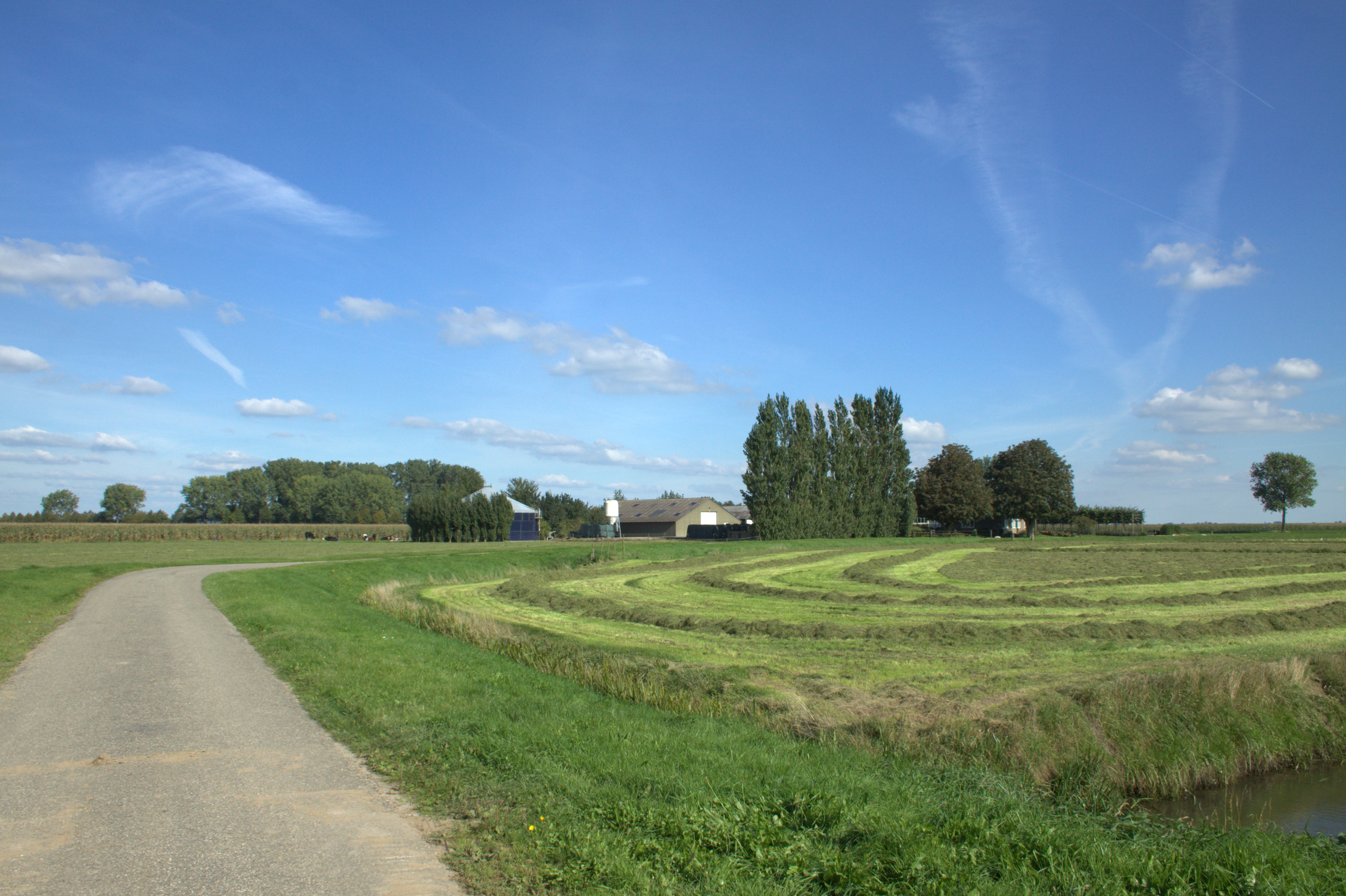
Rural area near Dussen

The municipality was formed on 1 January 2019, by the merger of the municipalities of Aalburg, Werkendam, and Woudrichem. Aalburg was only a municipality, Werkendam and Woudrichem are also population centres. Werkendam is the largest town, and the small city of Woudrichem is the historical centre of Altena. The village of Almkerk serves as the municipal seat and lies in the middle of the municipality.

Altena is a rural community with population centres mainly concentrated along the surrounding waterways. These waterways are (clockwise, starting in the west): Nieuwe Merwede, Boven Merwede, Afgedamde Maas, Heusdensch Kanaal, Bergsche Maas, and Amer.

De Biesbosch National Park is partially situated in the western part of Altena.

The municipality of Altena is nearly identical to the region of the Land van Heusden en Altena. Only the De Biesbosch area, consisting of the De Biesbosch National Park and polders above, falls outside. The waterway Steurgat largely forms the boundary.

== Population centres ==
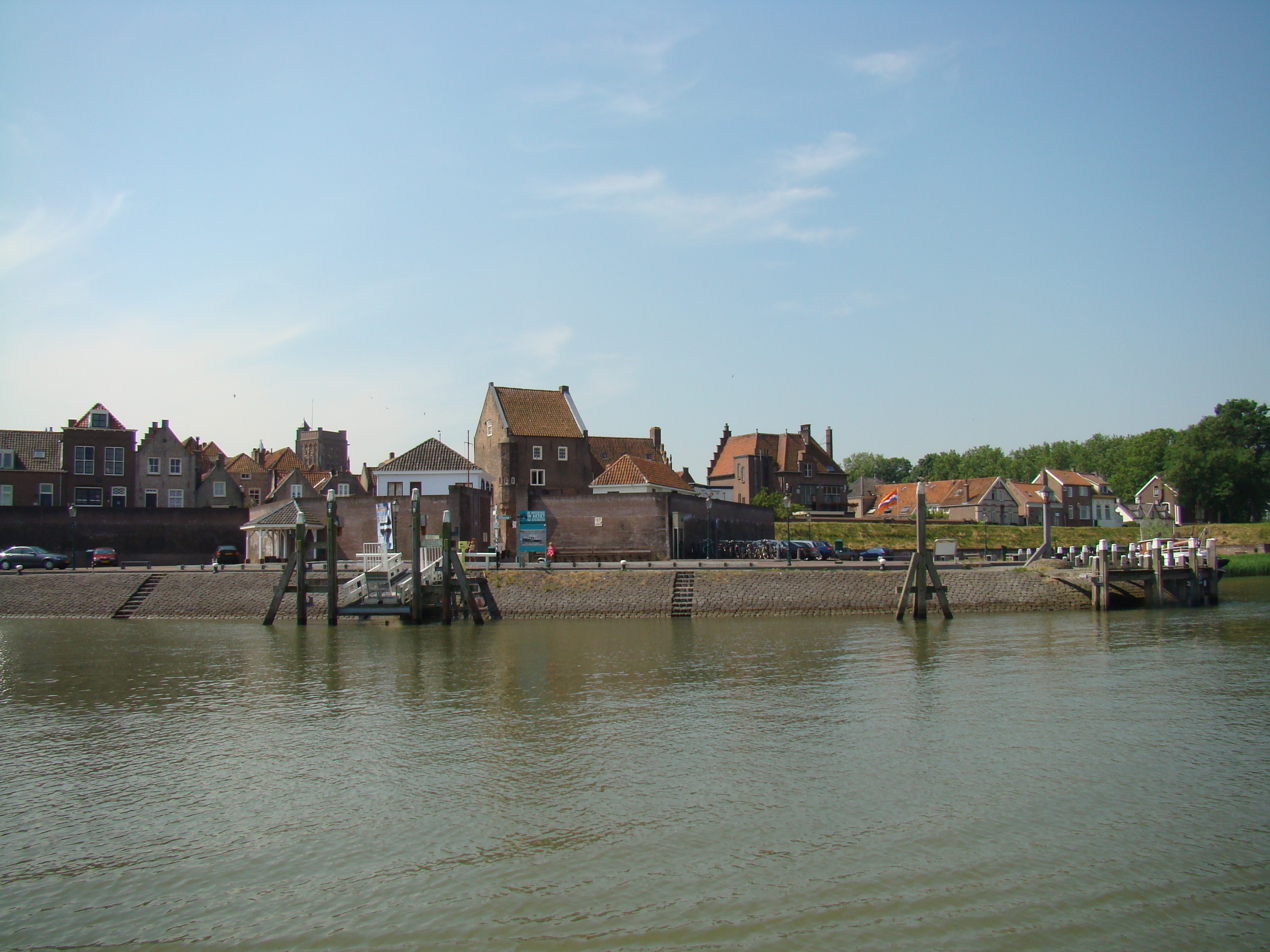
Woudrichem

The municipality of Altena officially has 1 city, 18 villages, and 27 hamlets. However, many villages are the size of a hamlet, and Werkendam and Woudrichem are the size of towns, the latter also having city rights.

City

- Woudrichem

Villages

- Almkerk
- Andel
- Babyloniënbroek
- Drongelen
- Dussen
- Eethen
- Genderen
- Giessen
- Hank
- Meeuwen
- Nieuwendijk
- Rijswijk
- Sleeuwijk
- Uitwijk
- Veen
- Waardhuizen
- Werkendam
- Wijk en Aalburg

Hamlets

- (De) Baan
- Biesheuvel
- Bronkhorst
- Buurtje
- Duizend Morgen
- Eng
- Hagoort
- Hill
- (De) Hoef
- Hoekeinde
- Keizersveer
- Kerkeinde
- Kievitswaard
- Kille
- Korn
- Moleneind
- Oudendijk
- Peerenboom
- Schans
- Spijk
- Stenenheul
- Steurgat
- Uppel
- Vierbannen
- Vijcie
- 't Zand
- Zandwijk

== Topography ==
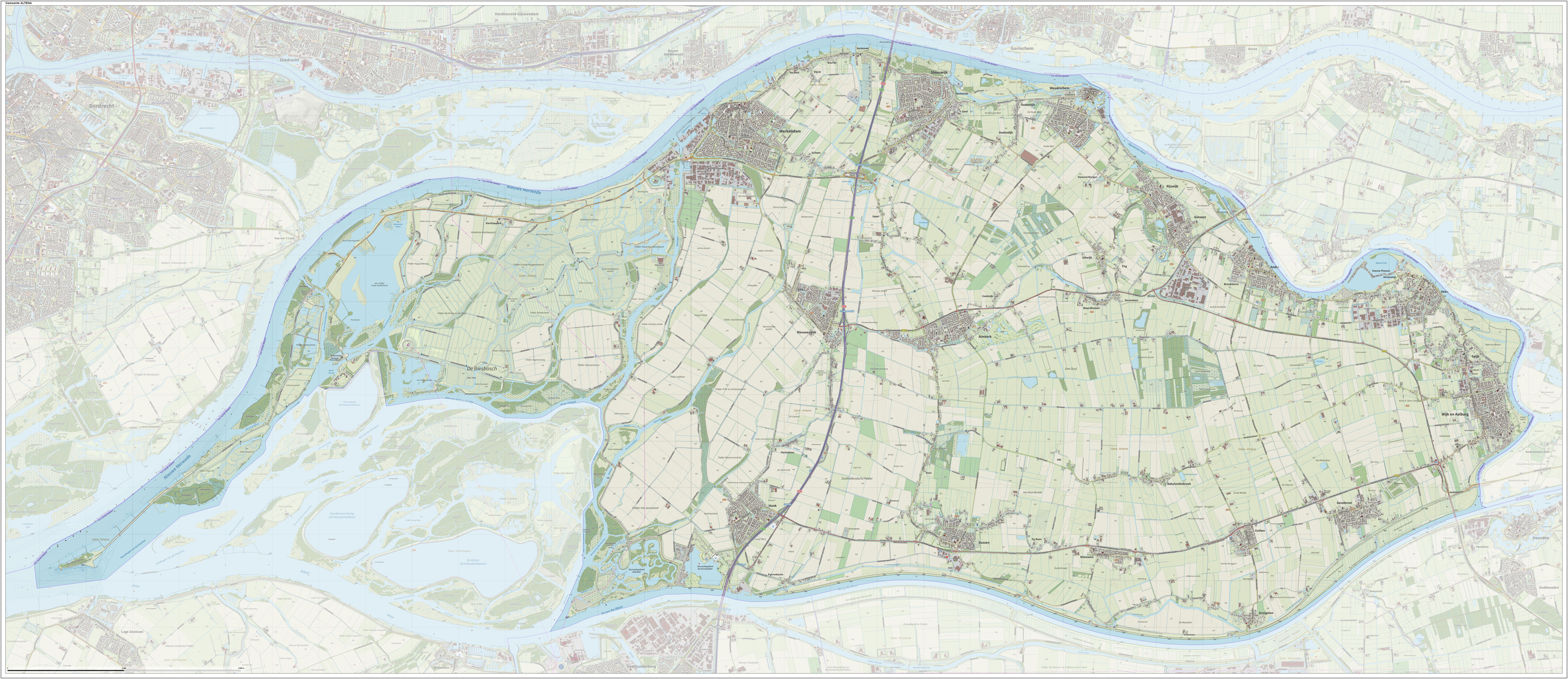

Map of the municipality of Altena, 2020

== Transport ==
Altena is accessible by bridges and ferries. Important bridges are the northern Merwede Bridge and the southern Keizersveer Bridge. Both bridges are part of motorway A27, which crosses the municipality from north to south.

A car ferry in the very western part connects the city of Dordrecht with Altena.

Nearest railway station is Gorinchem railway station in the municipality of Gorinchem, above Altena on the other side of the Boven Merwede river.

== History and religion ==
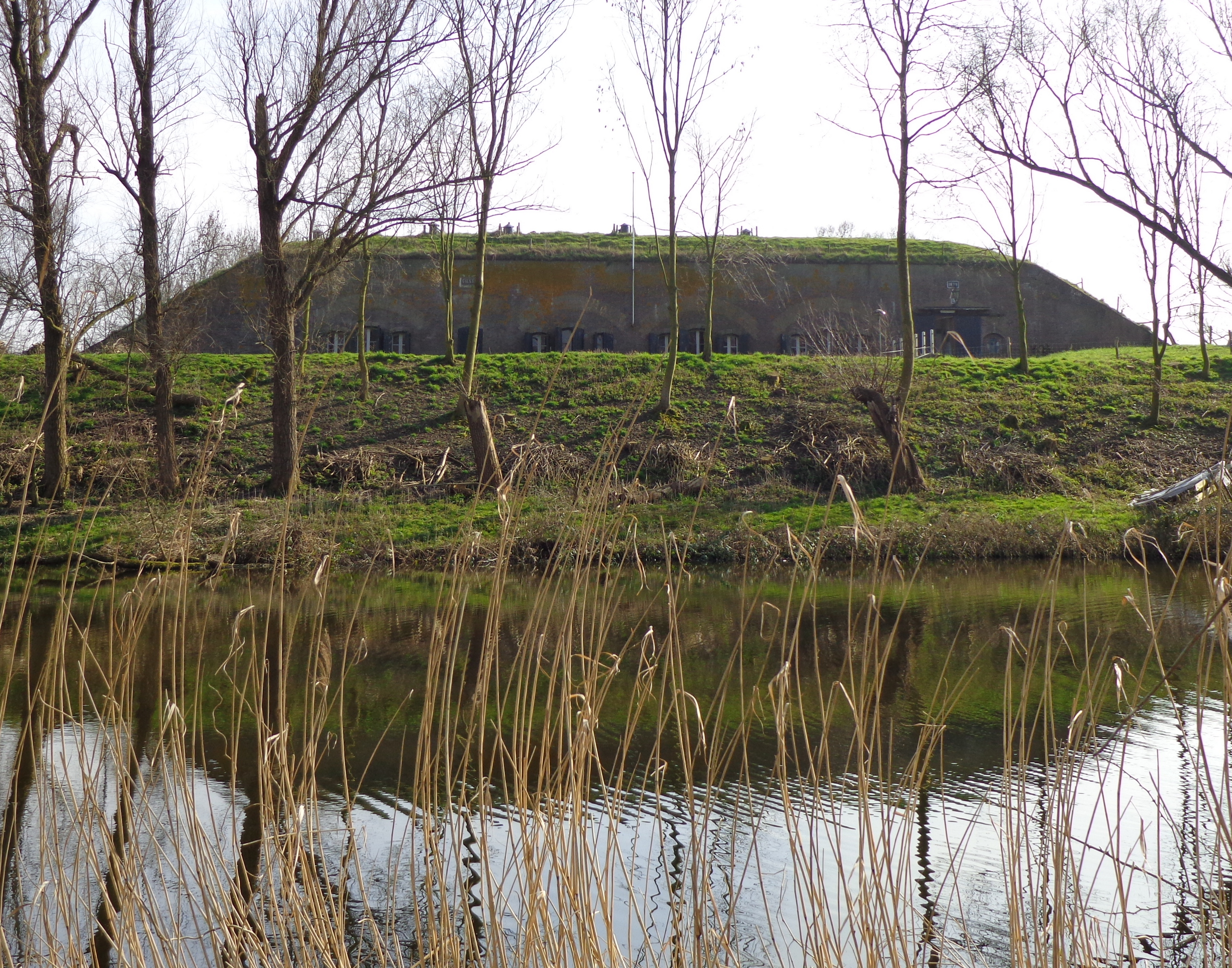
Fort Giessen near Giessen

Altena is the southernmost part of the Dutch Water Line, an obsolete defensive line, which contains several fortresses in this municipality like Fort Steurgat, Fort aan de Uppelse Dijk, and Fort Giessen, and with Woudrichem as a fortified city.

Contrary to most other North Brabant municipalities, Protestantism is dominant in the Altena municipality, especially the Reformed branch. Church attendance is high, and Christian-oriented political parties receive many votes.

== Politics ==
After the 2026 elections, the municipal council consisted of:

Party	Seats in 2026
Christian Democratic Appeal (CDA)	6
Altena Lokaal	5
Reformed Political Party (SGP)	5
Forum for Democracy	4
Vrije Volkspartij Altena	4
Progressief Altena	3
ChristianUnion (CU)	2
People's Party for Freedom and Democracy (VVD)	2
Total	31

The municipal executive consists of CDA, Altena Lokaal, SGP, and Progressief Lokaal. The Mayor has been CDA politician Egbert Lichtenberg since 9 December 2019.

== Sports ==
Several football clubs have their home base in the municipality:

- Achilles Veen in Veen
- GRC '14 in Giessen
- Kozakken Boys in Werkendam
- VV Almkerk in Almkerk

Each year the 7-Dorpenomloop Aalburg, a prestigious women's road bicycle race, is held in the southeast corner of Altena (the area of the former municipality of Aalburg, hence the name).

== Notable people ==
- Jan Hendrik van den Berg (1914–2012), psychiatrist
- Erik Braal (born 1971), basketball coach
- Hendrikus Colijn (1869–1944), prime minister
- Leendert Antonie Donker (1899–1956), minister of Justice
- Louwrens Hanedoes (1822–1905), landscape painter
- Hans van Helden (born 1948), speed skater
- Adri van Heteren (born 1951), politician and Christian minister (in Werkendam)
- Cornelis Pieter van den Hoek (1921–2015), resistance fighter (line-crosser)
- Louis van Iersel (1893–1987), American sergeant of World War I
- Ricardo Ippel (born 1990), footballer
- Rebekka Kadijk (born 1979), (beach) volleyball player
- Jan Lohman (born 1959), footballer
- Anton Mussert (1894–1946), civil engineer, political leader and war criminal
- Hans Oerlemans (born 1950), climatologist
- Leo van der Pluym (1935–2020), cyclist
- Marieke Lucas Rijneveld (born 1991), writer
- Elsbeth van Rooy-Vink (born 1973), cyclist
- Jan Nico Scholten (1932–2026), politician (mayor of Andel, Giessen, and Rijswijk)
- Carola Schouten (born 1977), minister of Agriculture
- Raymond Schouten (born 1985), motorcycle racer
- Kees Stoop (1929–2019), painter
- Edwin Straver (1971–2020), motorcycle racer
- Henri Karel Frederik van Teijn (1839–1892), general and governor
- Gijsbert van Tienhoven (1841–1914), prime minister
- Hermanus Eliza Verschoor (1791–1877), politician (mayor of De Werken en Sleeuwijk)
- Mart Visser (born 1968), fashion designer
- Niels Vorthoren (born 1988), footballer
- Marianne Vos (born 1987), cyclist
