= Rijswijk (disambiguation) =

Rijswijk is a town and municipality in South Holland, Netherlands.

Rijswijk may also refer to:

- Rijswijk, Gelderland, a village in the municipality of Buren, Netherlands
- Rijswijk, North Brabant, a village in the municipality of Altena, Netherlands
- Rijswijk, Indonesia, a site of the Dutch Governor General compound in the Dutch East Indies

== Other ==
- Treaty of Ryswick, signed in 1697 in Rijswijk, present-day South Holland
