= Honswijk, North Brabant =

Coordinates: 51°58′N 5°11′E

Honswijk is a historic municipality in the Dutch province of North Brabant. It was located to the west of the city of Woudrichem, in the Land van Altena. Between 1812 and 1950 the territory was divided between as many as four municipalities, namely Almkerk, Rijswijk, De Werken en Sleeuwijk and Woudrichem. In the 21st century Honswijk belonged for most of its former area to Woudrichem, with a small section belonging to Werkendam. The territory consists of three polders, namely Ruigenhoek, P. Honswijk and Oudbroek, the latter also being a small hamlet. Honswijk has an estimated population of 35.

== History ==
The village of Honswijk was inhabited already in the 11th century, but written history commences in 1264, with the foundation of a monastic grange, adhering to the Berne Abbey. The area was then further cultivated and the settlement grew, enjoying support from the Lord of Altena. A chapel, known as the "blaue caemer", was consecrated in 1364, dedicated to Saint Nicholas.

in 1421 the area was devastated by the St. Elizabeth's Flood. The chapel and the abbey were badly destroyed and the village grounds were only regained from the water after forty years. Even though attempts of reconstruction by the abbey were initiated, the religious order lost its influence after the Reformation in the 16th century. Honswijk, along with its buildings gradually disappeared from the map. By the time of the introduction of the municipal system in the early 19th century, only its polders and water board remained.

== Miscellaneous ==
Up until the 1920s, four polder windmills were located in Honswijk. Three of them (Rijswijk, Honswijk and Uppel) were destroyed or removed by 1930, leaving only the Uitwijkse Molen still standing.

The flag of Honswijk is horizontally divided into three stripes of red, yellow and white, with over the center an armorial shield depicting a white carbuncle on a blue field.
