= Kille =

Kille may refer to:

- Kille, Netherlands, a hamlet in the municipality of Altena
- Kille (card game), a Swedish card game of the Cuckoo family
