= 't Zand, Altena =

't Zand
- Hamlet
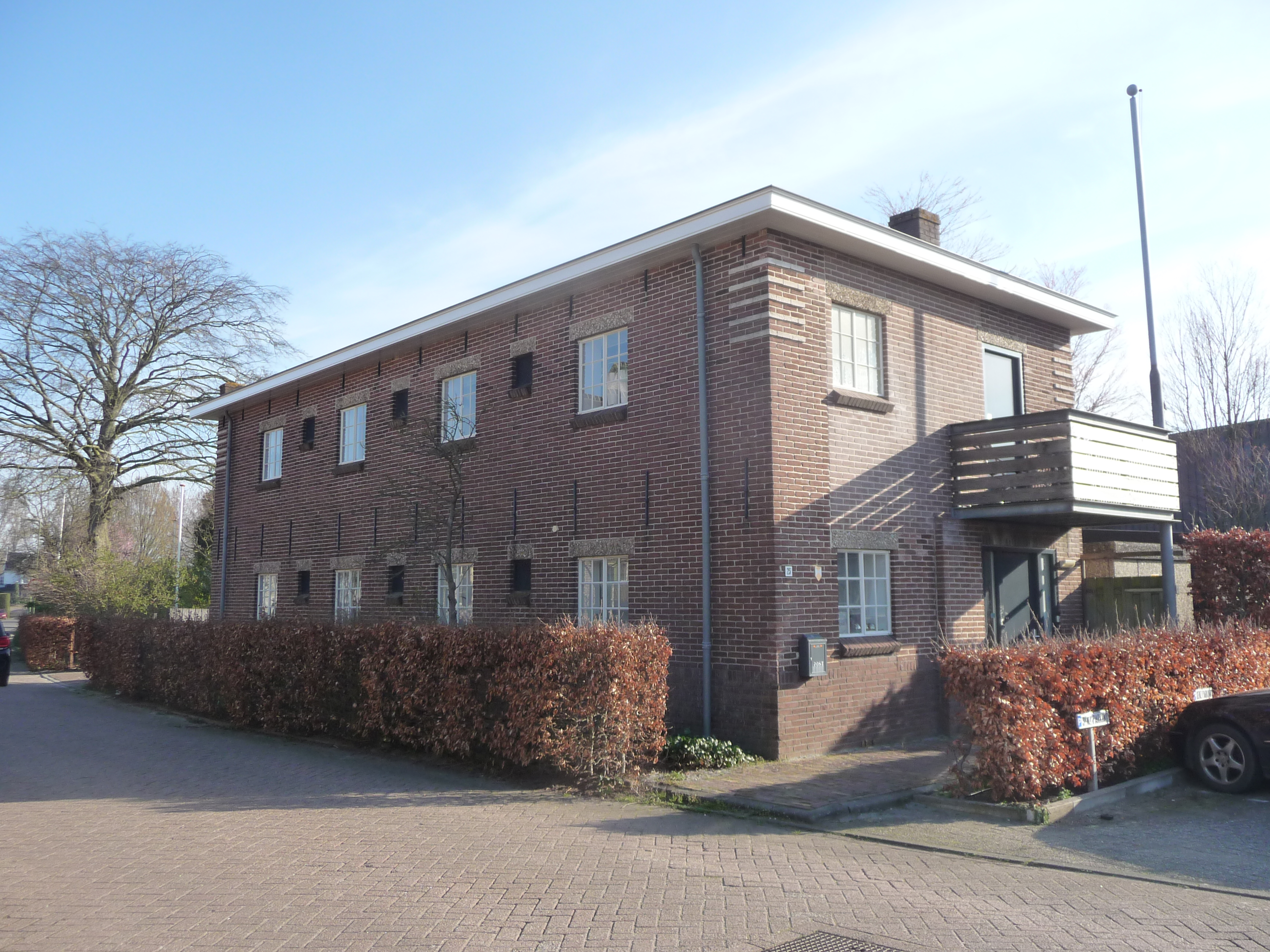
- Flower bulbs warehouse in 't Zand

- Location in the province of North Brabant in the Netherlands 't Zand (Netherlands)
- Coordinates: 51°48′51″N 4°57′45″E
- Country: Netherlands
- Province: North Brabant
- Municipality: Altena
- Time zone: UTC+1 (CET)
  - Summer (DST): UTC+2 (CEST)
- Postal code: 4254
- Dialing code: 0183

't Zand is a hamlet in the Dutch province of North Brabant. It is located in the municipality of Altena, on the southeastern edge of the village of Sleeuwijk.

't Zand is not a statistical entity, and the postal authorities have placed it under Sleeuwijk. It consists of about 40 houses.

It was first mentioned in 1980 as 't Zand, and means sand.
