= Honswijk =

Honswijk may refer to:

Places in the Netherlands:

- Honswijk, North Brabant, a former village in the Dutch municipality of Altena
- Honswijk, Utrecht, a hamlet in the Utrecht municipality of Houten
