= Ricardo Ippel =

Dutch footballer (born 1990)

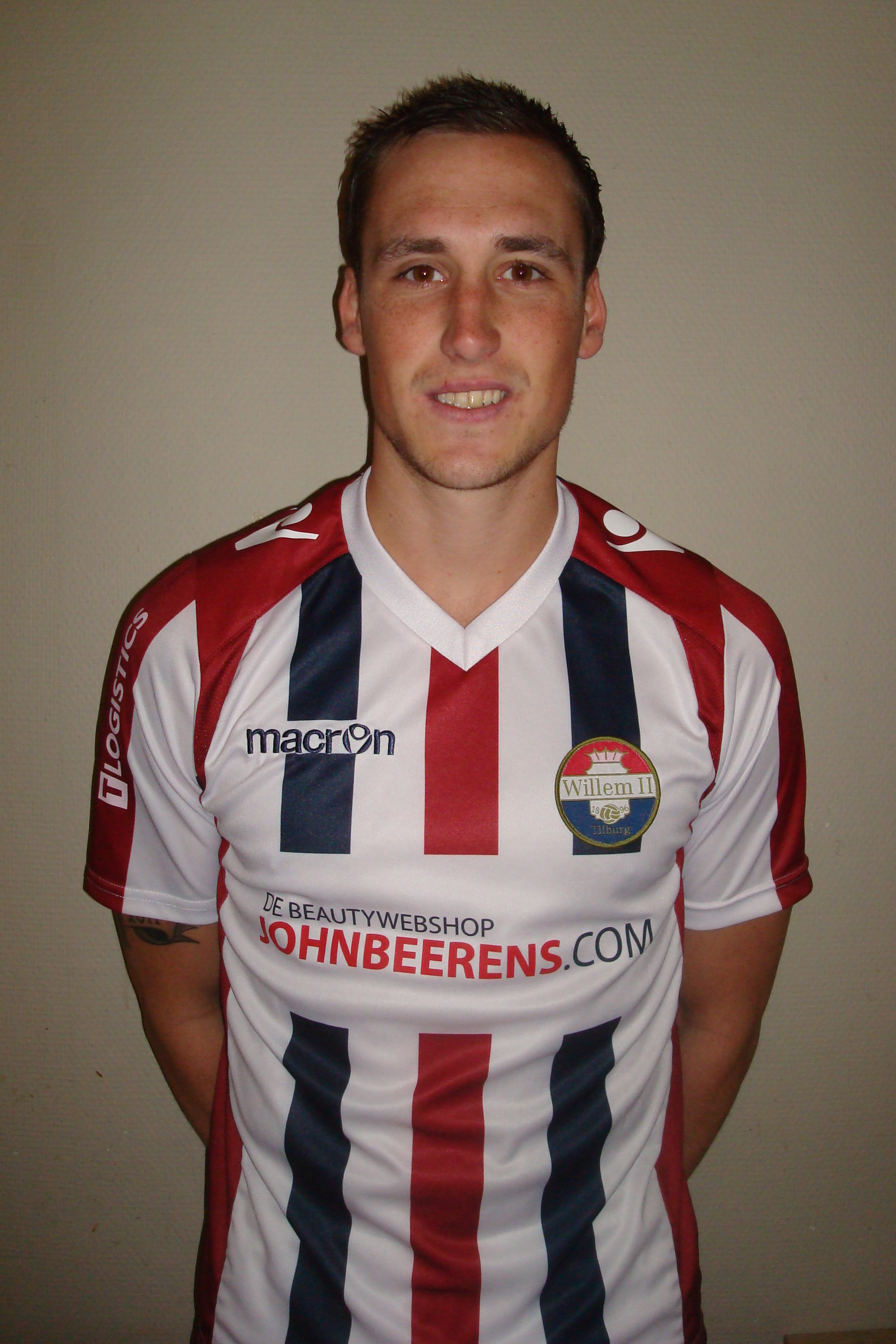
- Ippel with Willem II

Personal information
- Date of birth: 31 August 1990 (age 36)
- Place of birth: Hank, Netherlands
- Height: 1.76 m (5 ft 9 in)
- Position: Midfielder

Team information
- Current team: De Treffers
- Number: 6

Youth career
- Be Ready
- Willem II

Senior career*
Years	Team	Apps	(Gls)
2010–2015	Willem II	80	(2)
2015–2019	MVV	108	(2)
2019–2020	Lommel	19	(0)
2021–	De Treffers	123	(2)
- * Club domestic league appearances and goals as of 15:57, 4 March 2026 (UTC)

Ricardo Ippel (born 31 August 1990) is a Dutch footballer plays as a midfielder for Tweede Divisie club De Treffers.

== Career ==
Ahead of the 2019–20 season, Ippel joined Belgian First Division B club Lommel SK on a two-year contract with an option for one further year.

On 12 March 2021, De Treffers announced the signing of Ippel, with him joining the club from the 2021–22 season.

== Honours ==
Willem II

- Eerste Divisie: 2013–14
