= Babyloniënbroek =

- Village
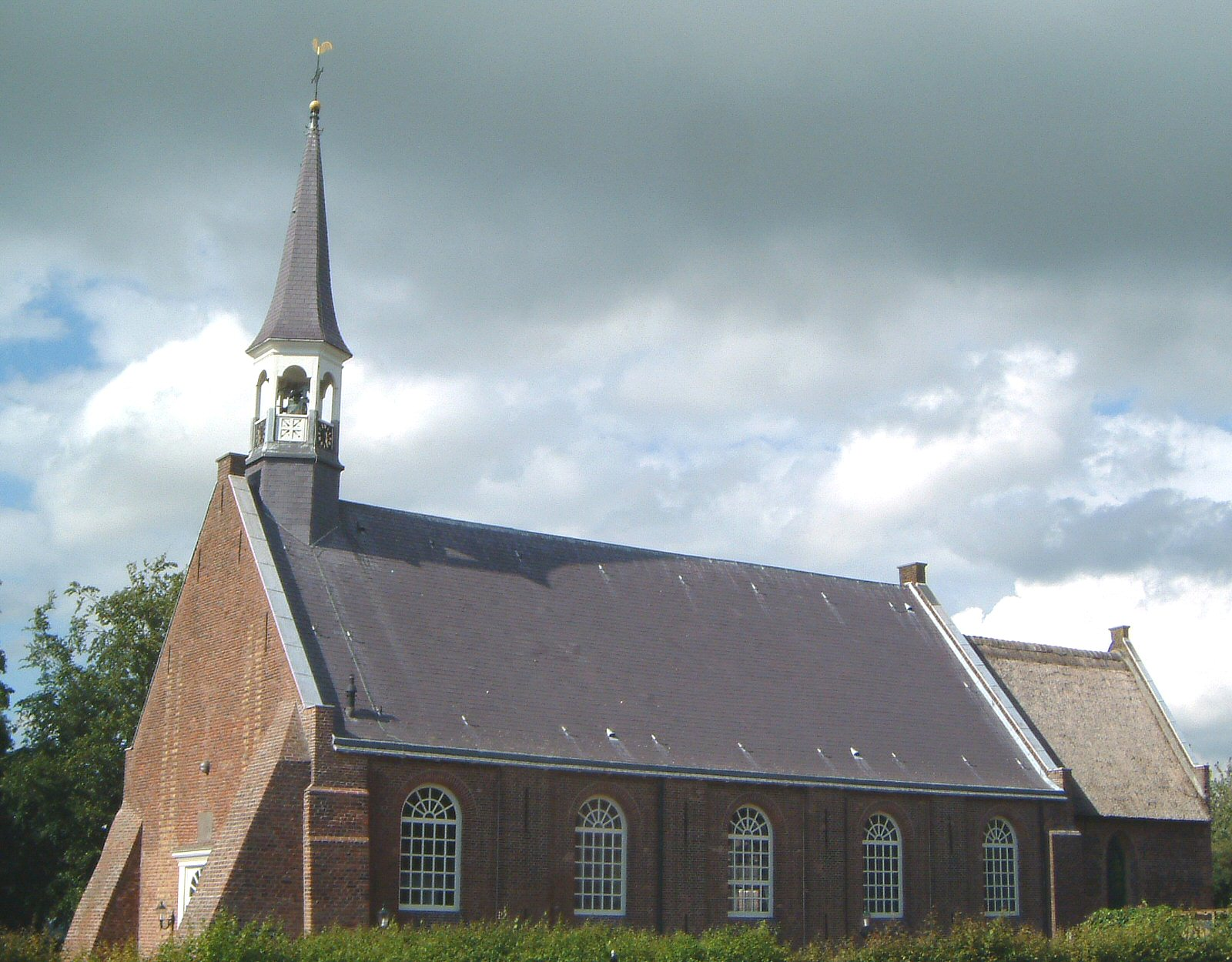
- Church in Babyloniënbroek

- Location in the province of North Brabant in the Netherlands Babyloniënbroek (Netherlands)
- Coordinates: 51°44′35″N 5°1′18″E
- Country: Netherlands
- Province: North Brabant
- Municipality: Altena

Area
  - Total: 8.70 km^{2} (3.36 sq mi)
- Elevation: −0.1 m (−0.33 ft)

Population (2021)
  - Total: 425
  - Density: 48.9/km^{2} (127/sq mi)
- Time zone: UTC+1 (CET)
  - Summer (DST): UTC+2 (CEST)
- Postal code: 4269
- Dialing code: 0416

Babyloniënbroek is a village in the Dutch province of North Brabant. It is in the municipality of Altena, about 7 km northwest of the city of Waalwijk.

Babyloniënbroek consists of a single street, and has about 400 inhabitants. The name Babylon has the suffix Broek added. 'Broek' is a word linked to the root of the English word, 'Brook' for stream or the springs of a stream, and the meaning in Dutch is very similar, meaning swamp or swampy. The village was first mentioned in 1131 as Babilonia. Babyloniënbroek is a linear settlement which started as a cultivation project by the monastery of Sint-Truiden around 1130 alongside a canal which no longer exists.

The Dutch Reformed church building probably dates from the 14th century. In 1664, the nave was enlarged using material of the older church. It was restored until 1975. The church used to function as a place of refuge in case of floods. The last time it was used was in 1809.

Babyloniënbroek was home to 250 people in 1840.

== Notable citizens ==
- Marianne Vos (born 1987), cyclist

== Gallery ==
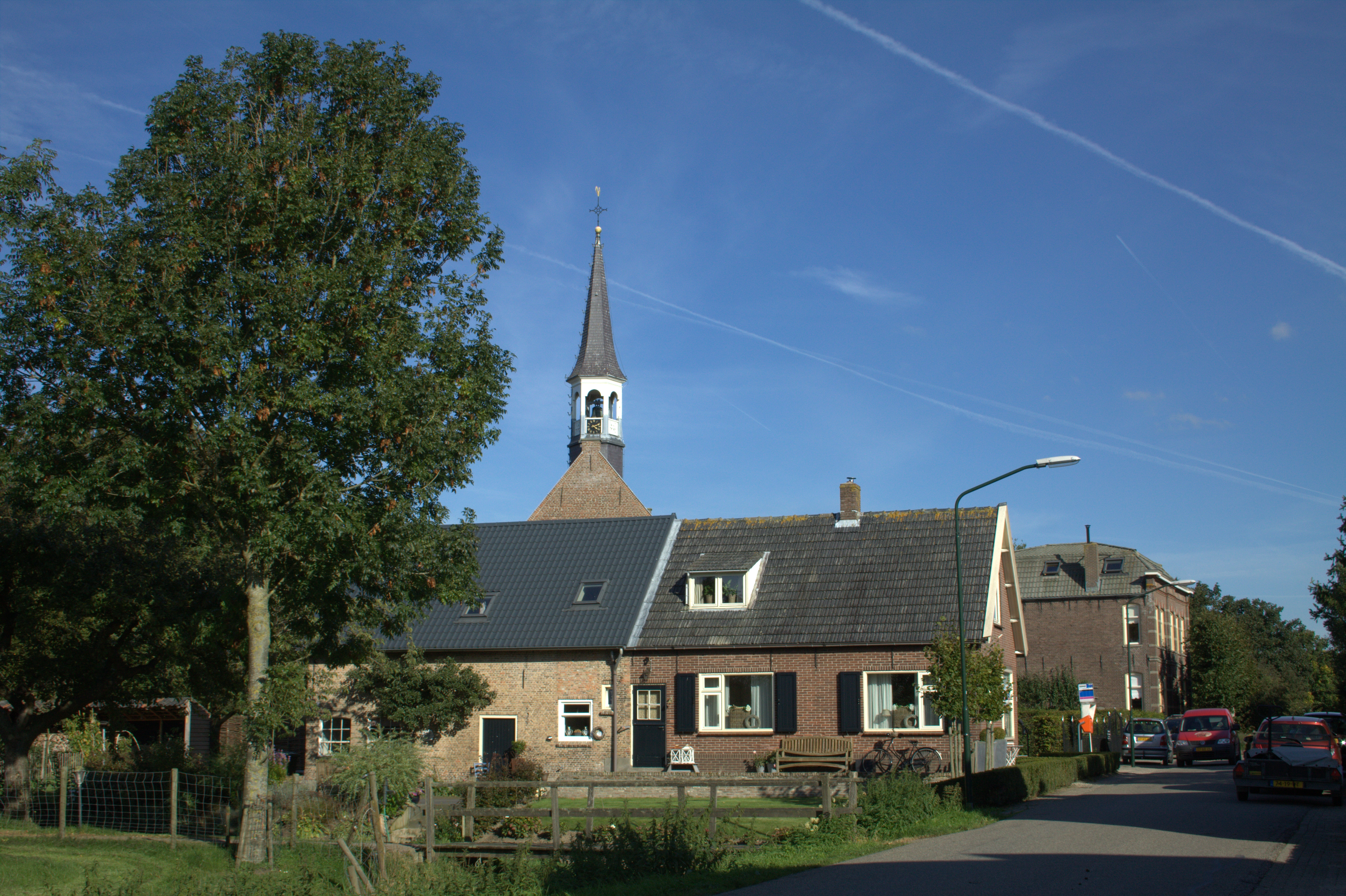
Village view

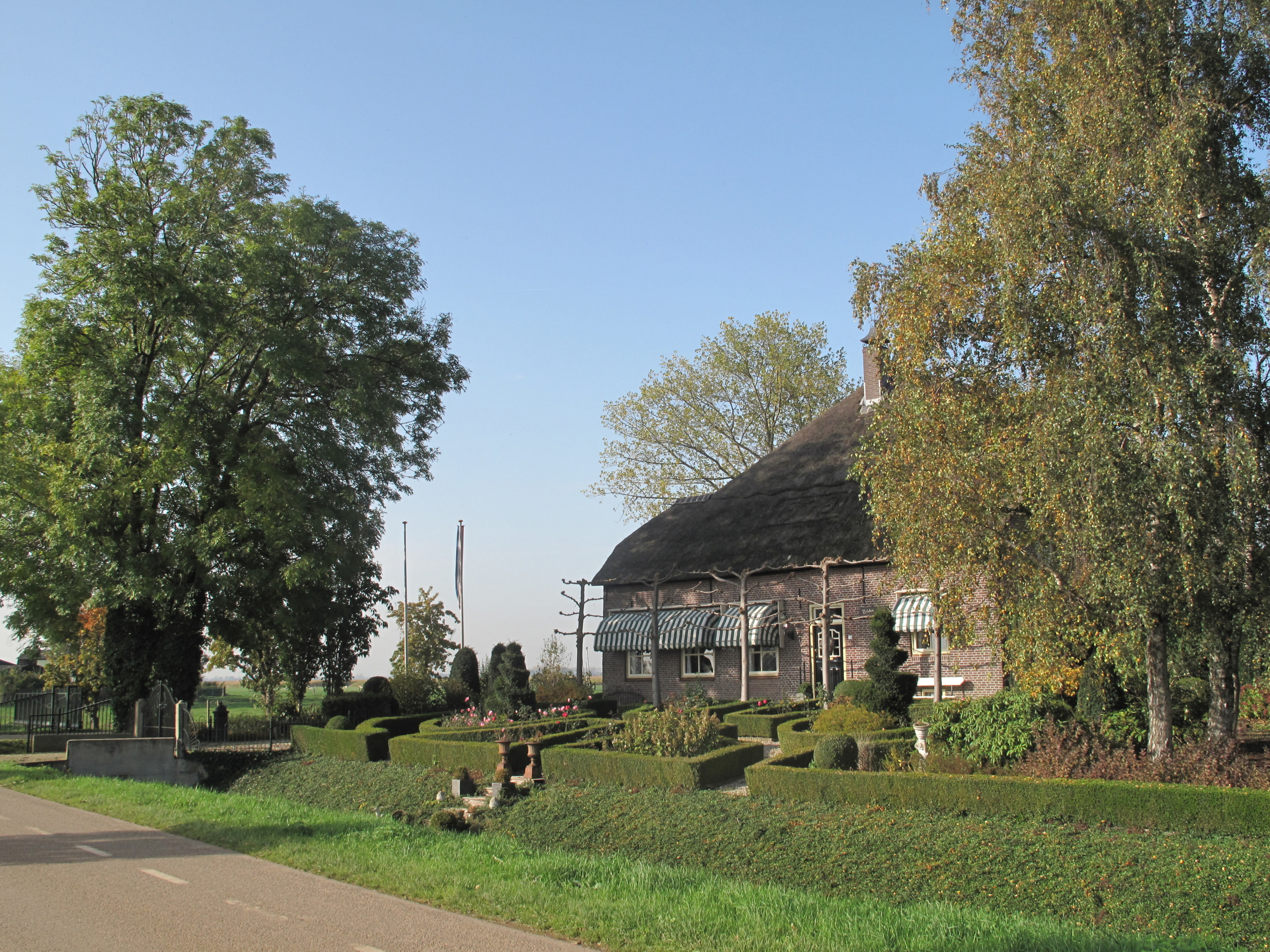
Farm in Babyloniënbroek

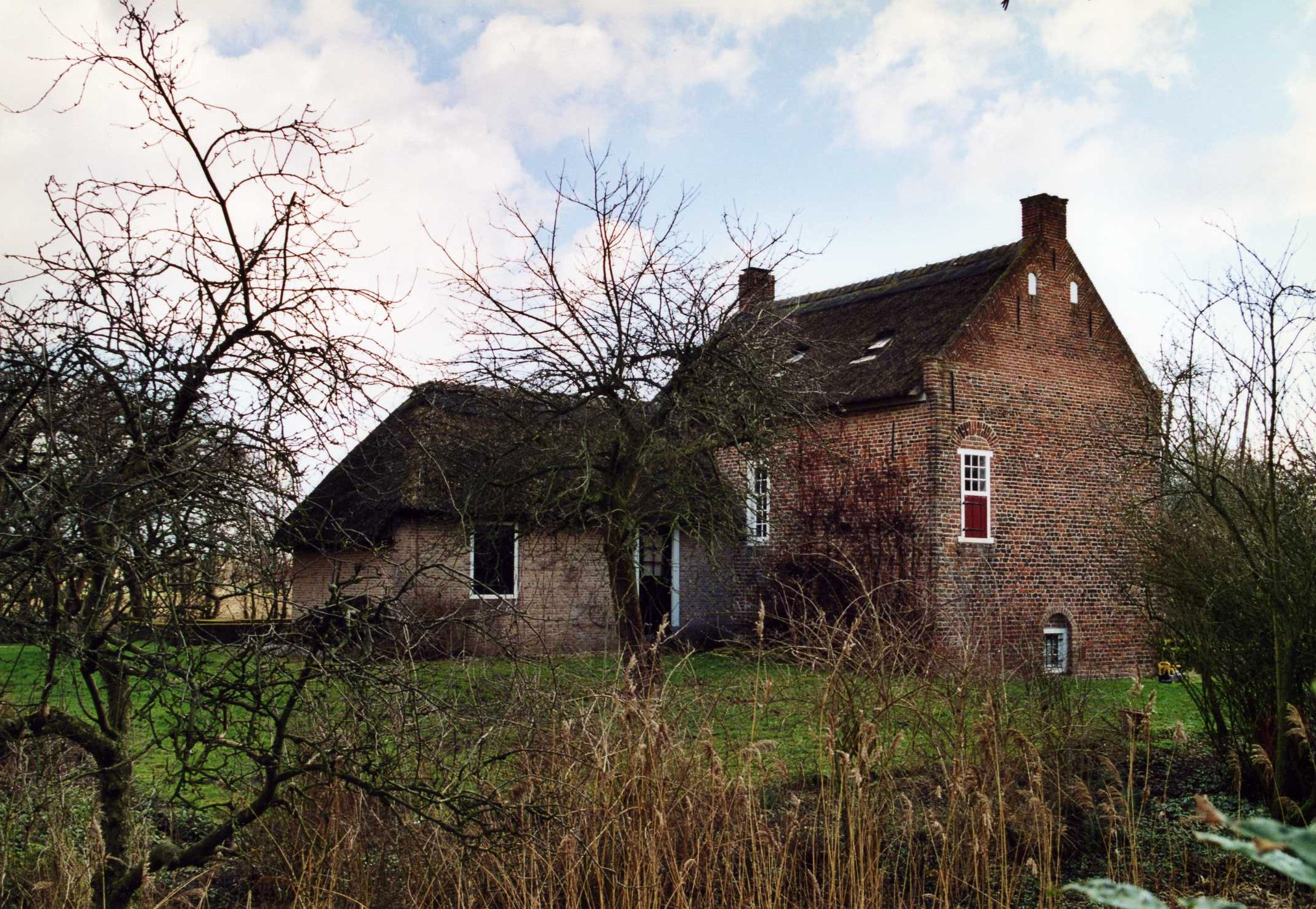
Farm in Babyloniënbroek

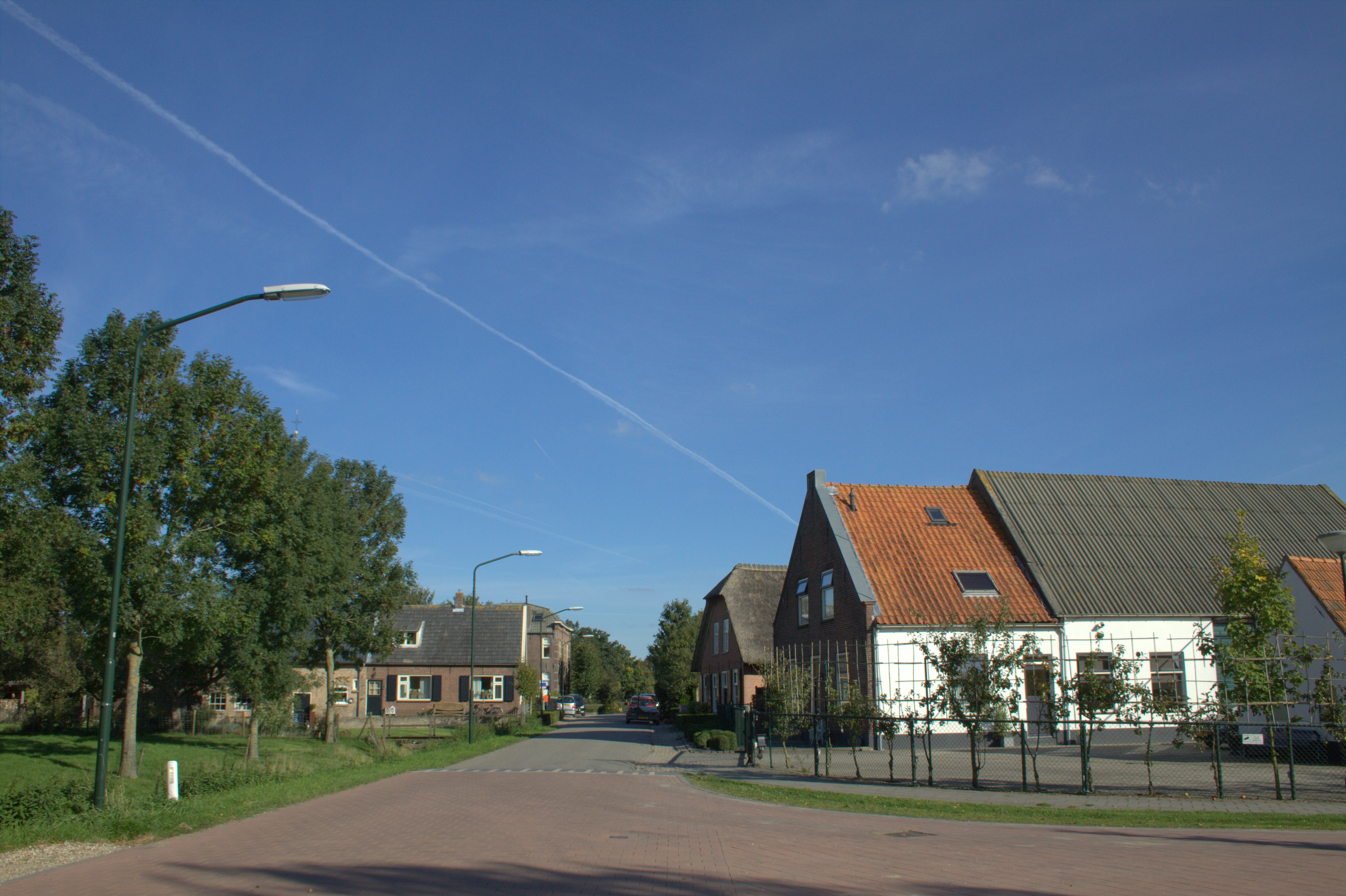
Street view
