= Kievitswaard =

- Hamlet
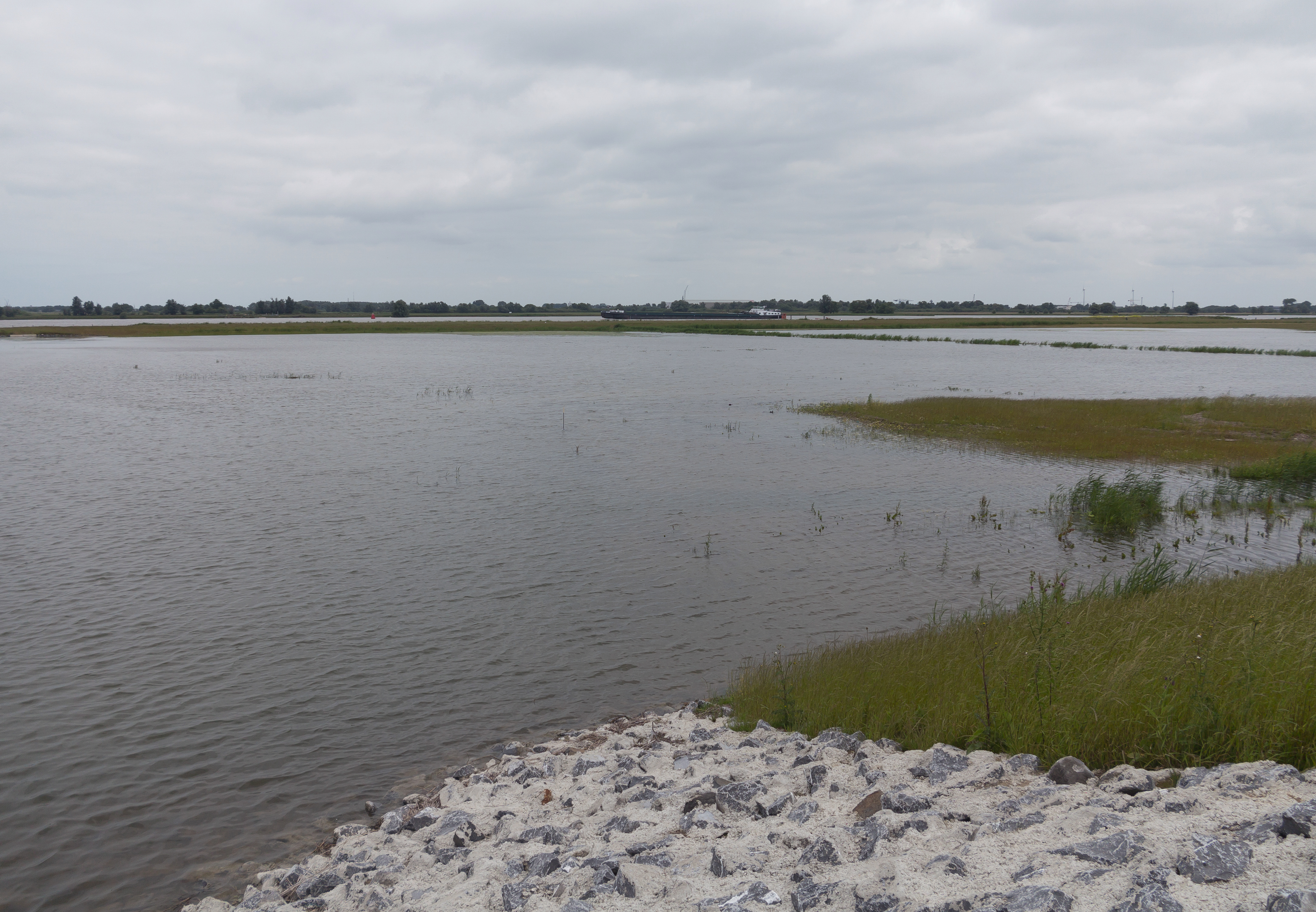
- View on the Nieuwe Merwede from Kievitswaard

- Location in the province of North Brabant in the Netherlands Kievitswaard (Netherlands)
- Coordinates: 51.79221°N 4.82064°E
- Country: Netherlands
- Province: North Brabant
- Municipality: Altena
- Time zone: UTC+1 (CET)
  - Summer (DST): UTC+2 (CEST)
- Postal code: 4251
- Dialing code: 0183

Kievitswaard is a hamlet in the Dutch province of North Brabant. It is a part of the municipality of Altena, and lies about 10 km east of Dordrecht. Kievitswaard lies in the Biesbosch area.

It is not a statistical entity and the postal authorities have placed it under Werkendam. It was first mentioned in 1845 as Kievitswaard (De), and is the name of a polder. It is a combination of "land on water" and the northern lapwing bird.

The hamlet used to have place name signs, however they were removed again. Kievitswaard was home to 12 people in 1840. Nowadays, it consists of about 40 house.
