= Mart Visser =

Dutch fashion designer and sculptor (born 1968)

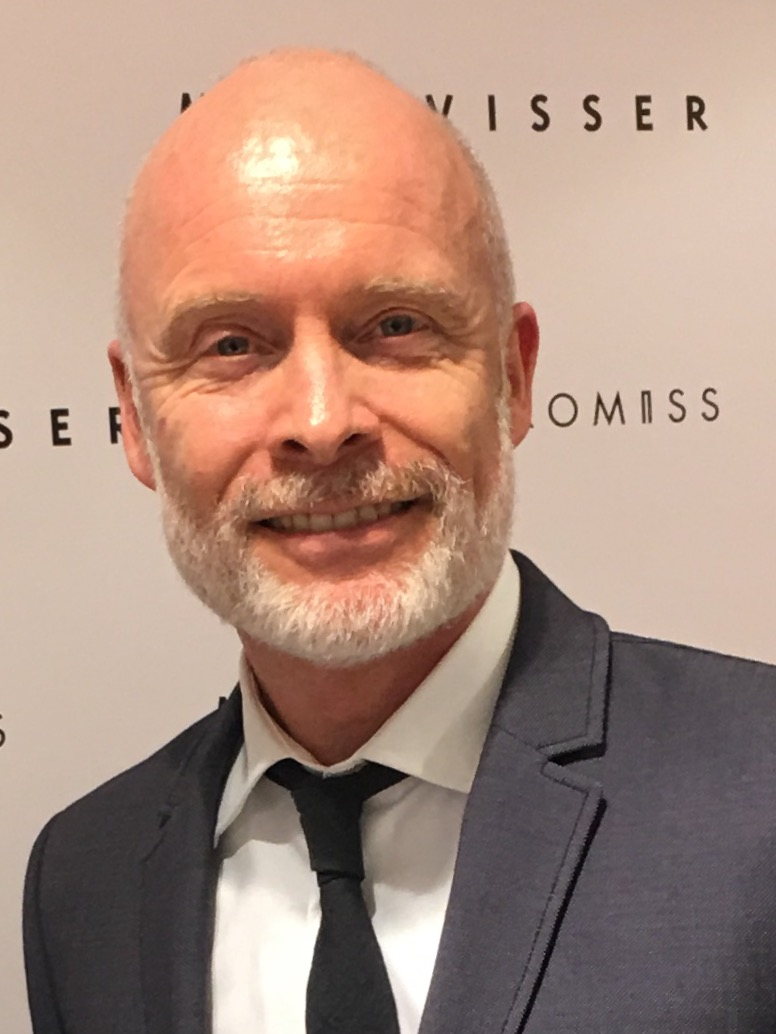
- Born: 8 July 1968 (age 57); Sleeuwijk, Netherlands
- Education: Hogeschool van Amsterdam; Modeacademie Montaigne; Saga International Design Centre
- Occupation: Fashion designer
- Label: Mart Visser Haute Couture

Mart Visser (born 10 July 1968) is a Dutch fashion designer and sculptor from Sleeuwijk, Netherlands.

== Education ==
Visser studied fashion and design at the Hoge School Amsterdam. The Amsterdam Fashion Academy (formerly known as Charles Montaigne) and the Saga International Design Centre in Copenhagen, and worked as assistant for Frans Molenaar.

== Career ==
=== Fashion ===
Visser launched his first couture collection in 1992 and went on to create a ready-to-wear collection in 2003. The store Mart Visser Haute Couture is located in Amsterdam, Netherlands. In 2009, Visser designed new uniforms for KLM Royal Dutch Airlines for female pilots, cabin and ground crews, consisting of a capsule wardrobe of 11 pieces.

=== Visual arts ===
In 2022, his paintings and sculptures were the subject of a three-month exhibition in Beelden aan Zee.

== Personal life ==
Visser was born to Arie Visser and Marry Visser-van Doorn, a Dutch politician who served in the House of Representatives of the Netherlands from 1997 to 2002 for the Christian Democratic Appeal, as middle of three children. Visser is openly gay and married to his husband Job van Dooren, a business consultant.
