= Elsbeth van Rooy-Vink =

Dutch cyclist

Personal information
- Full name: Elsbeth van Rooy-Vink
- Born: 25 January 1973 (age 53) Wijk en Aalburg, the Netherlands

Cycling career
- Sport: Cycling
- Discipline: MTB
- Role: Rider

Elisabet "Elsbeth" van Rooy-Vink (born 25 January 1973 in Wijk en Aalburg) is a Dutch cyclist specializing in competitive mountain biking.

Van Rooy-Vink represented the Netherlands at the 1996 Summer Olympics in Atlanta in both the road race and mountain biking, while at the 2004 Summer Olympics in Athens she only competed in mountain biking. In Atlanta's road race, she finished in 28th position, 53 seconds behind the winner. She did better in mountain biking, ranking fifth. She repeated this performance in Athens, eight years later, again ranking fifth.

== See also ==
- List of Dutch Olympic cyclists
