= Hermanus Eliza Verschoor =

Dutch politician

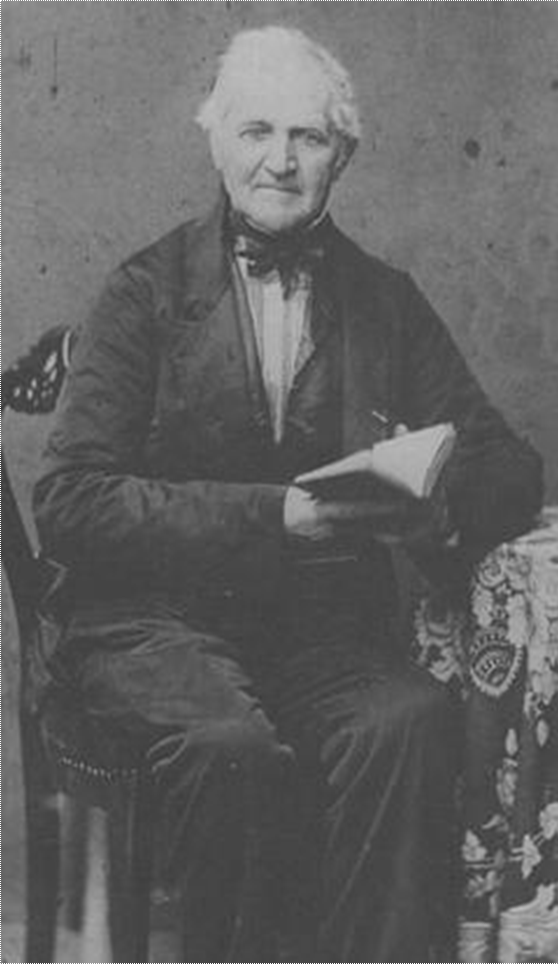

Hermanus Eliza Verschoor (10 July 1791, in Sleeuwijk – 2 August 1877, in Sleeuwijk) was a Dutch politician.
