= Vierbannen =

- Hamlet
- Location in the province of North Brabant in the Netherlands Vierbannen (Netherlands)
- Coordinates: 51°44′55″N 04°54′32″E
- Country: Netherlands
- Province: North Brabant
- Municipality: Altena
- Time zone: UTC+1 (CET)
  - Summer (DST): UTC+2 (CEST)
- Postal code: 4255
- Dialing code: 0133

Vierbannen is a hamlet in the Dutch province of North Brabant. It is a part of the municipality of Altena, and lies about 11 km south of Gorinchem.

Vierbannen is not a statistical entity, and the postal authorities have placed it under Nieuwendijk. It consists of about 40 houses.

It was first mentioned in 1798 as Vierbanse Sluys, and is a settlement near a sluice with the same name. A "banne" was an old name for polder land often also a drainage area.
