= Wijk en Aalburg =

- Village
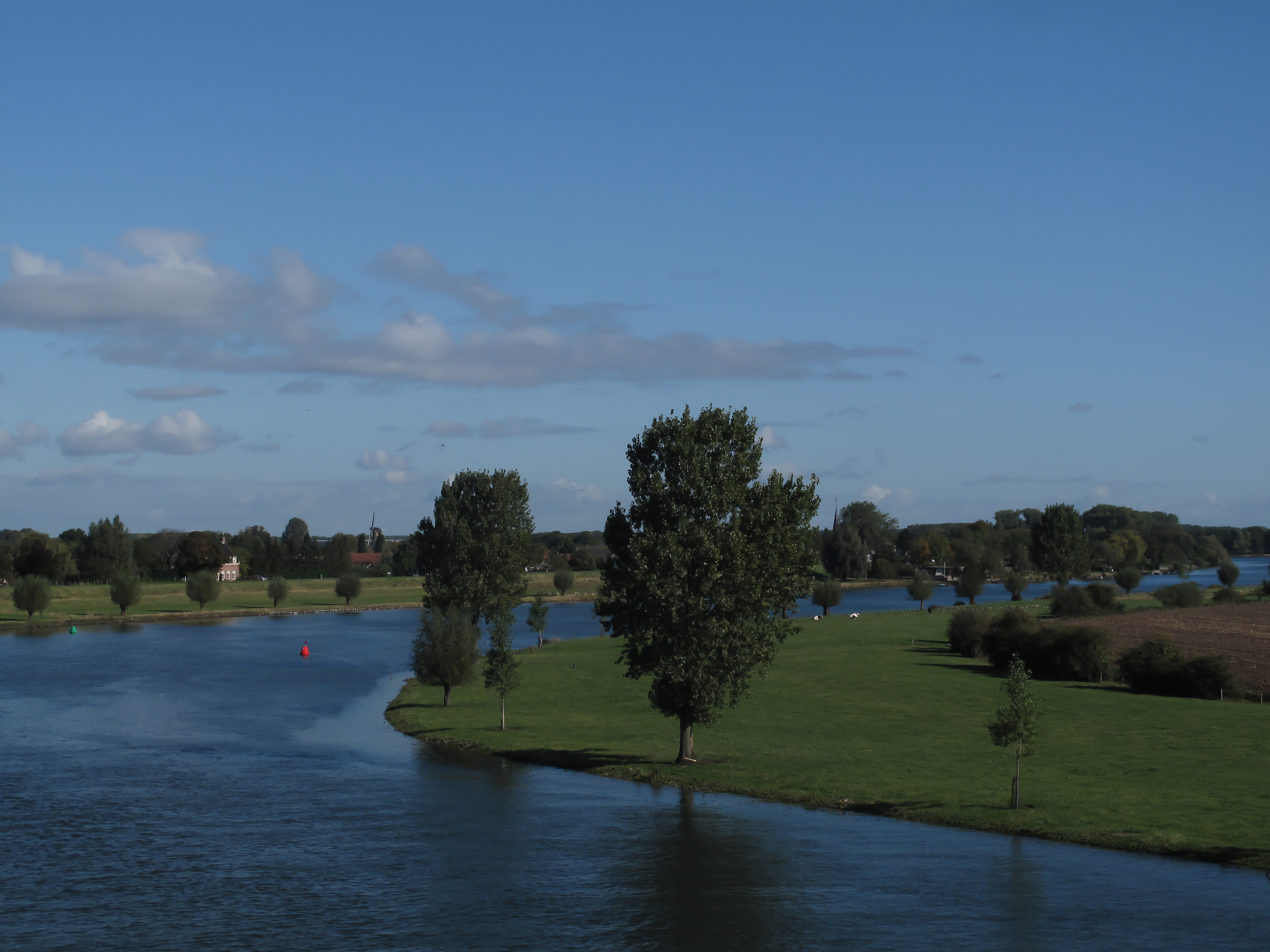
- Near Wijk en Aalburg, view of the village

- Coat of arms

- Location in the province of North Brabant in the Netherlands Wijk en Aalburg (Netherlands)
- Coordinates: 51°45′15″N 5°7′50″E
- Country: Netherlands
- Province: North Brabant
- Municipality: Altena

Area
  - Total: 16.08 km^{2} (6.21 sq mi)
- Elevation: 1.6 m (5.2 ft)

Population (2021)
  - Total: 5,100
  - Density: 320/km^{2} (820/sq mi)
- Time zone: UTC+1 (CET)
  - Summer (DST): UTC+2 (CEST)
- Postal code: 4261
- Dialing code: 0416

Wijk en Aalburg is a village in the Dutch province of North Brabant. It is located in the municipality of Altena, about 15 km northwest of 's-Hertogenbosch.

== History ==
Aalburg was first mentioned in 889 as Alburch. The etymology is unclear. Wijk was first mentioned in 1208 as Wic and means "neighbourhood". Both villages developed along the Afgedamde Maas in the Middle Ages and merged into a single settlement. The villages were frequently flooded.

The tower of the Dutch Reformed church of Aalburg probably dates from the 14th century. The church has been extensively modified in 1630. The church of Wijk is a basilica-like structure which was extensively altered in the 18th century.

In 1813, during the French occupation, the administrative system of the Netherlands was reformed and old rights and privileges were abolished. On 31 January 1816, after the establishment of the Kingdom of the Netherlands, the Province of North Brabant decided to rent out the floodplains of the river. The mayor of Wijk sued the Province, because the area was a communal ground according to old privileges. On 3 June 1817, the court ruled that the floodplains are communal grounds.

In 1840, Wijk was home to 1,229 people and Aalburg was home to 486 people. Wijk en Aalburg was a separate municipality until 1973, when it merged with Eethen and Veen to form the new municipality of Aalburg. In 2019, it was merged into Altena.

== Gallery ==
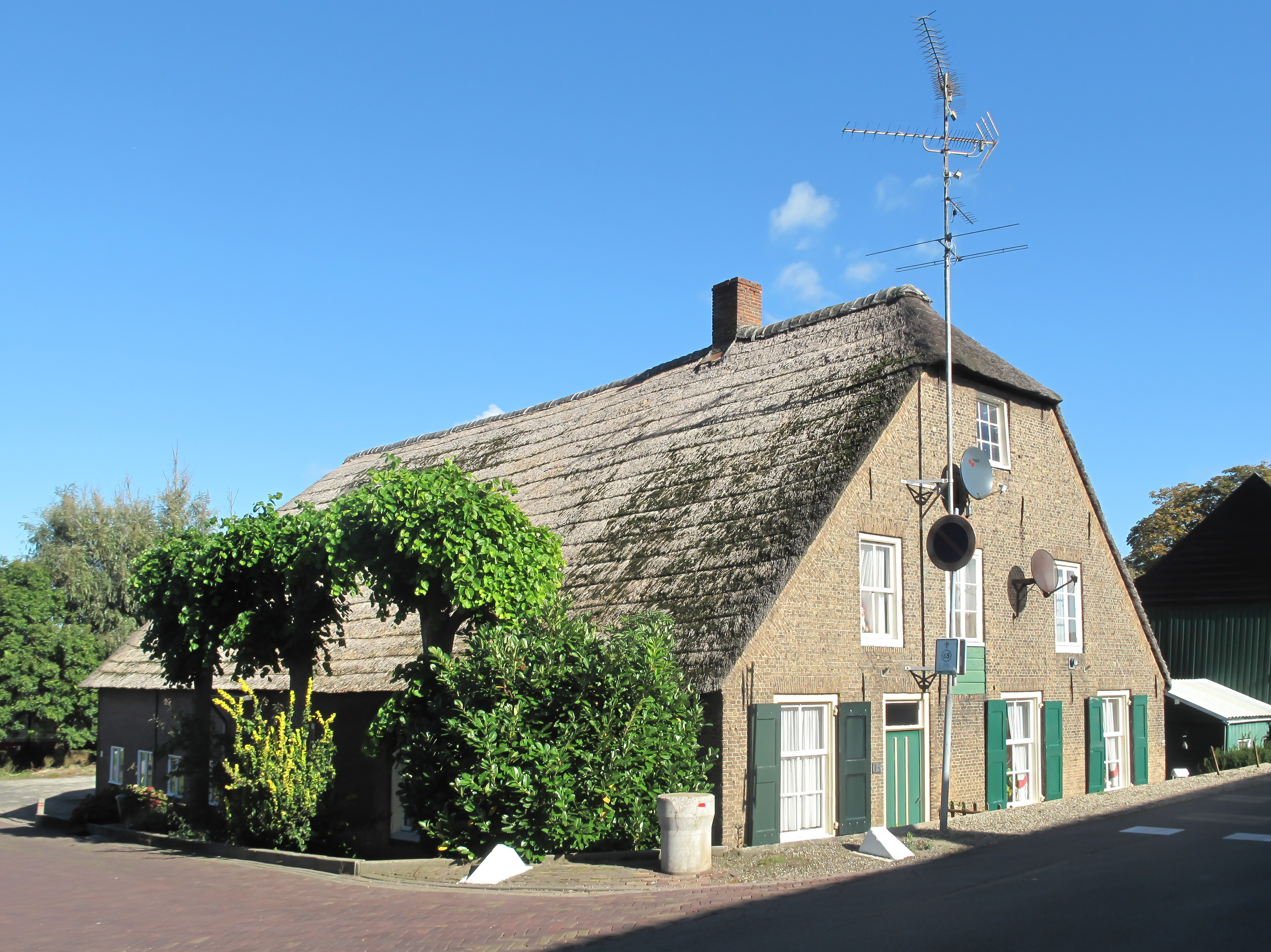
Wijk en Aalburg, monumental farmhouse

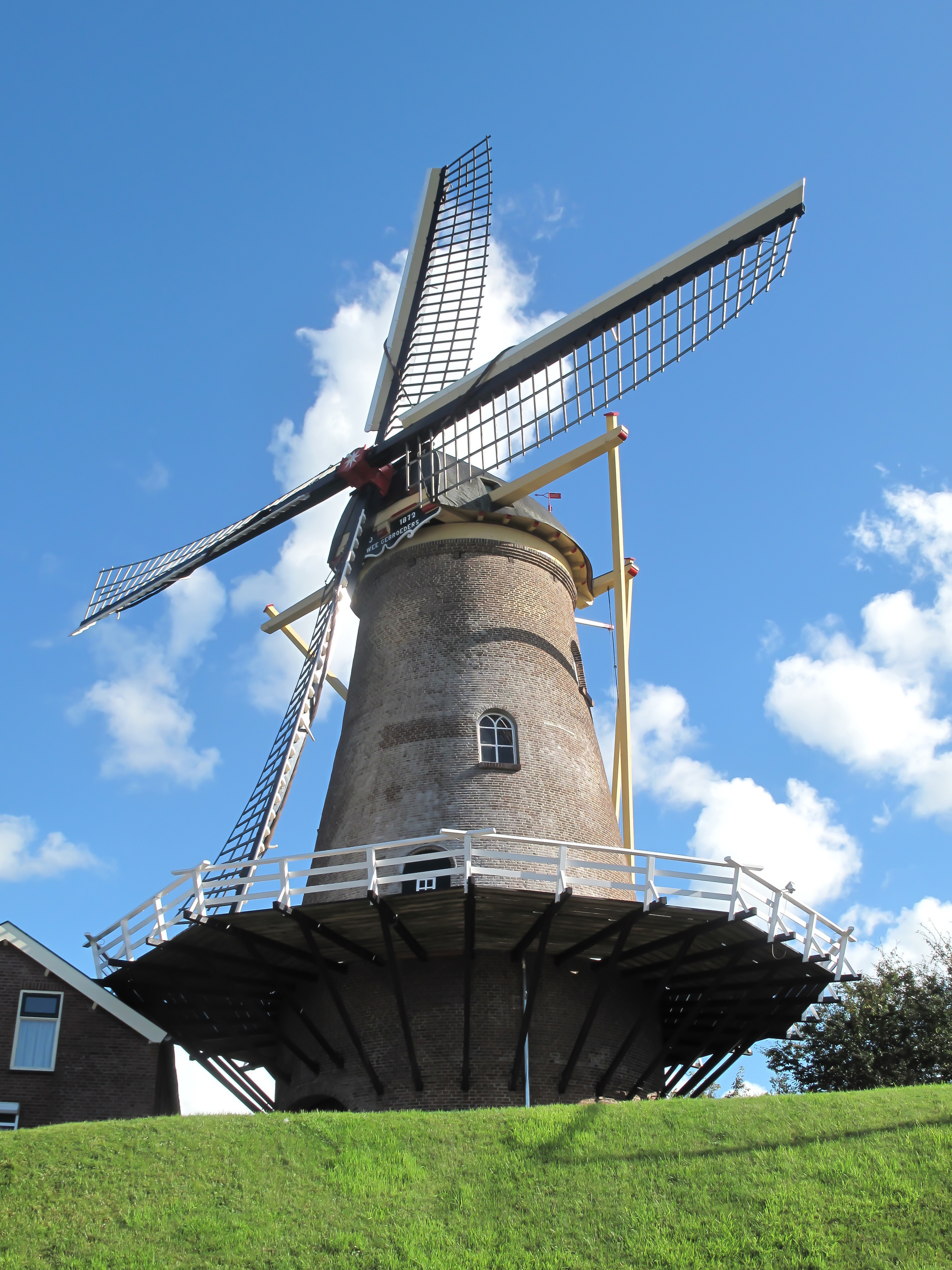
Wijk en Aalburg, Windmill: Stellingmolen (a high windmill with gallery) - "de Twee Gebroeders"

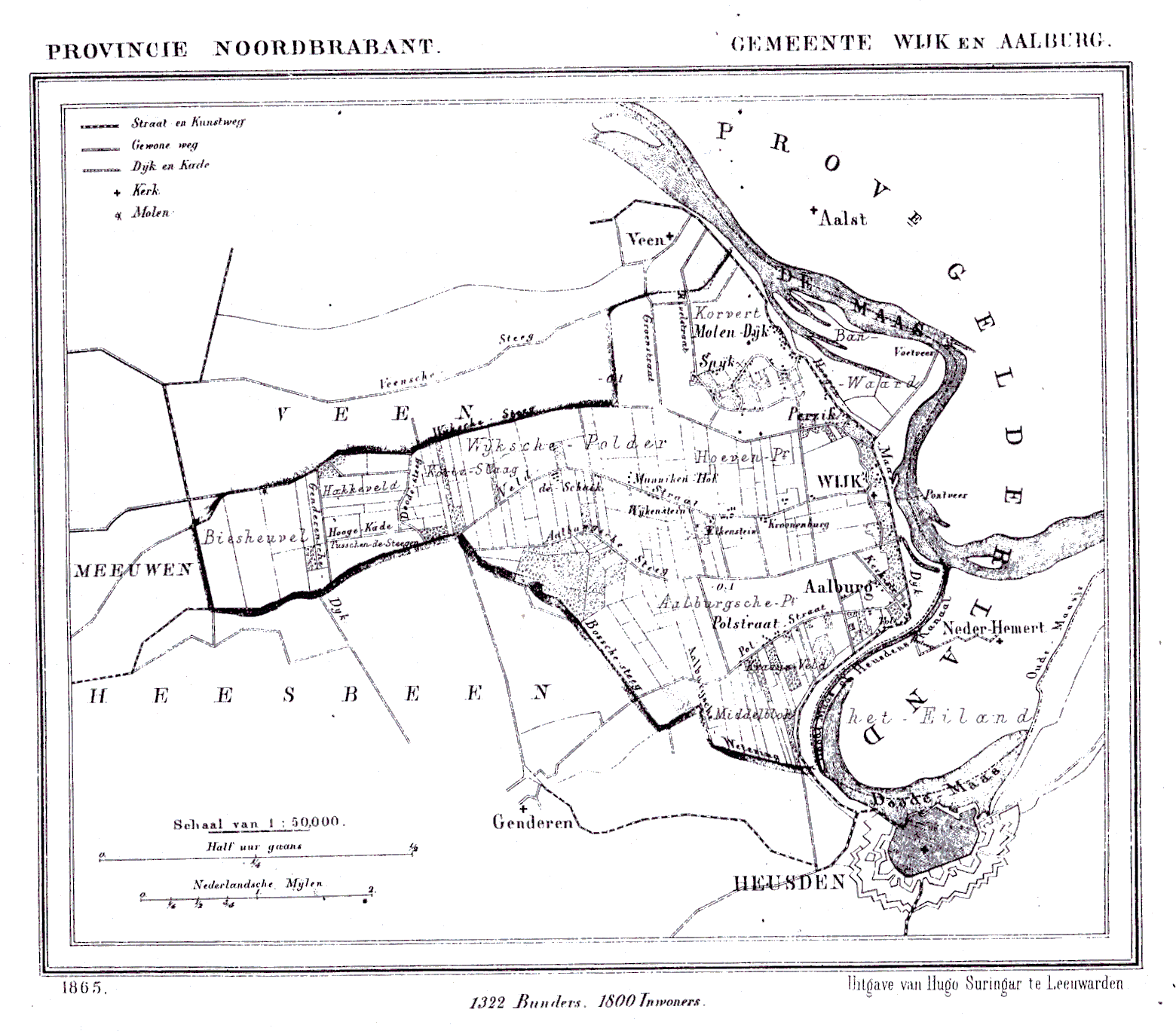
Wijk en Aalburg in 1865

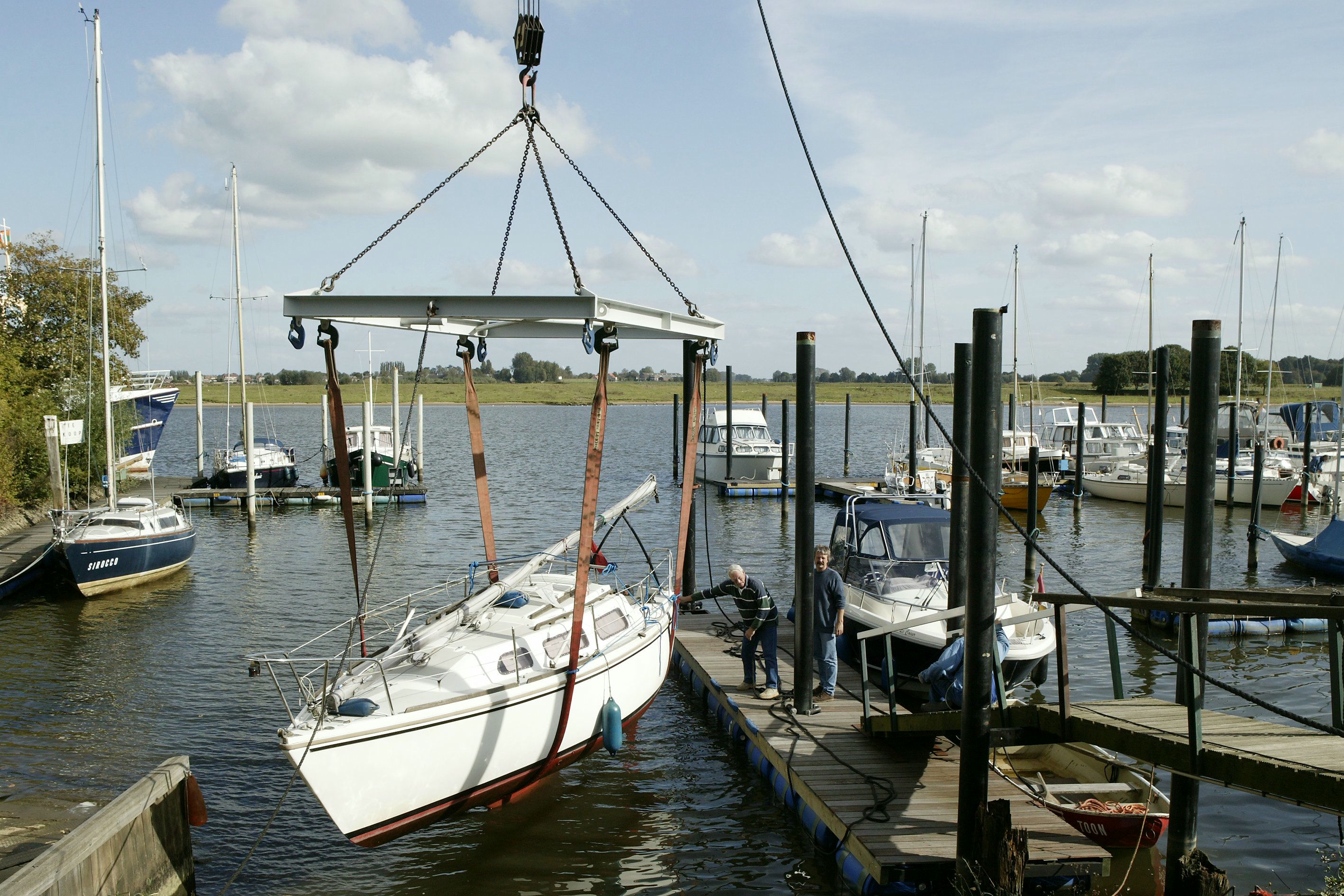
Removing a yacht from the marina
