= Kille, Netherlands =

Kille
- Hamlet
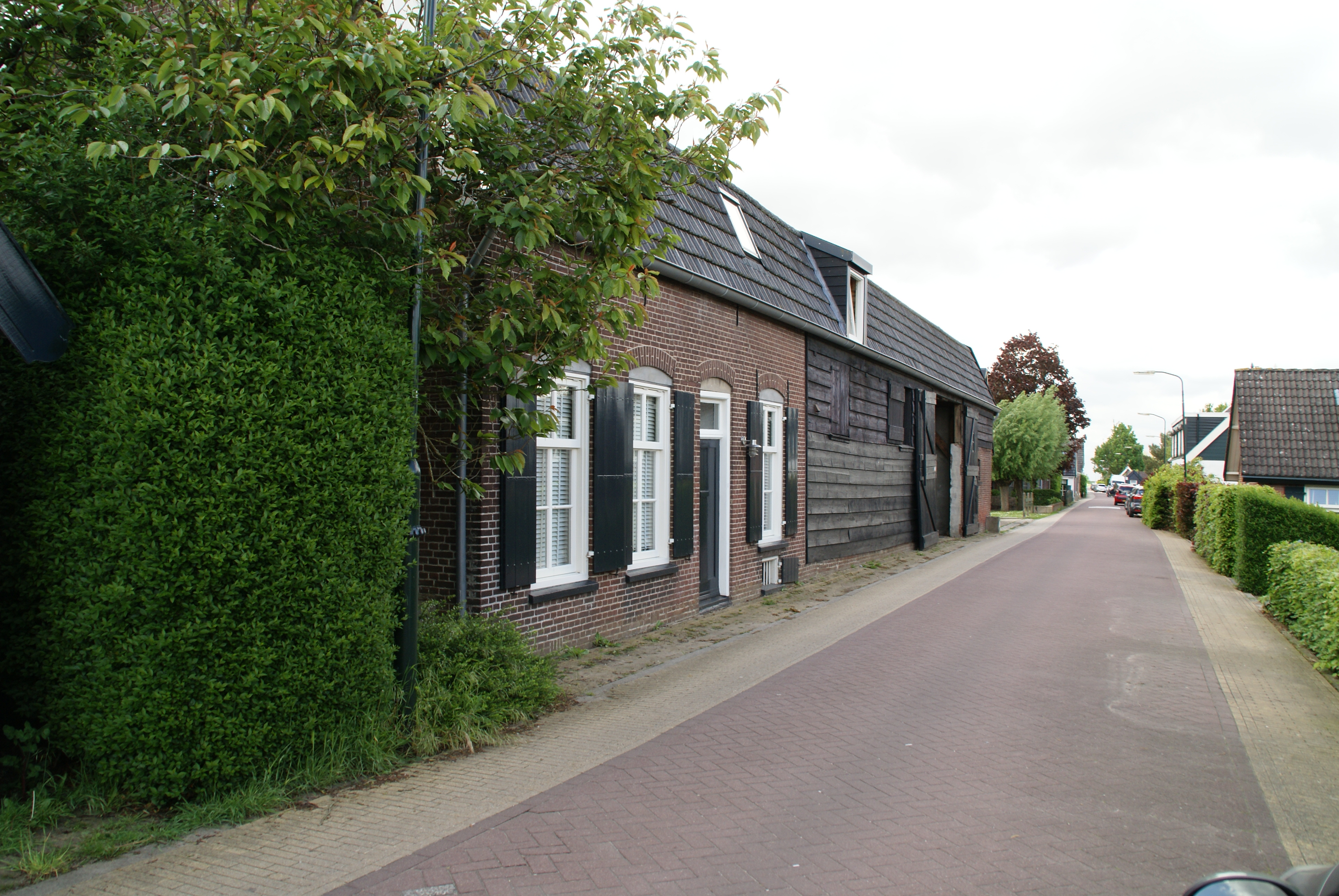
- Street view

- Location in the province of North Brabant in the Netherlands Kille (Netherlands)
- Coordinates: 51°47′N 4°55′E
- Country: Netherlands
- Province: North Brabant
- Municipality: Altena
- Time zone: UTC+1 (CET)
  - Summer (DST): UTC+2 (CEST)
- Postal code: 4255
- Dialing code: 0183

Kille is a hamlet in the Dutch province of North Brabant. It is a part of the municipality of Altena, and lies northwest of Nieuwendijk, and about 8 km southwest of Gorinchem.

Kille is not a statistical entity, and the postal authorities have placed it under Nieuwendijk.

It was first mentioned in 1874 as Kille, and means gully. The name is a reference to the stream Bakkerskil. It has become a single urban area with Nieuwendijk, but still has its own place name signs. Kille was home to 216 people in 1840. Nowadays it consists of about 100 houses.
