= Hank, Netherlands =

Hank
- Village
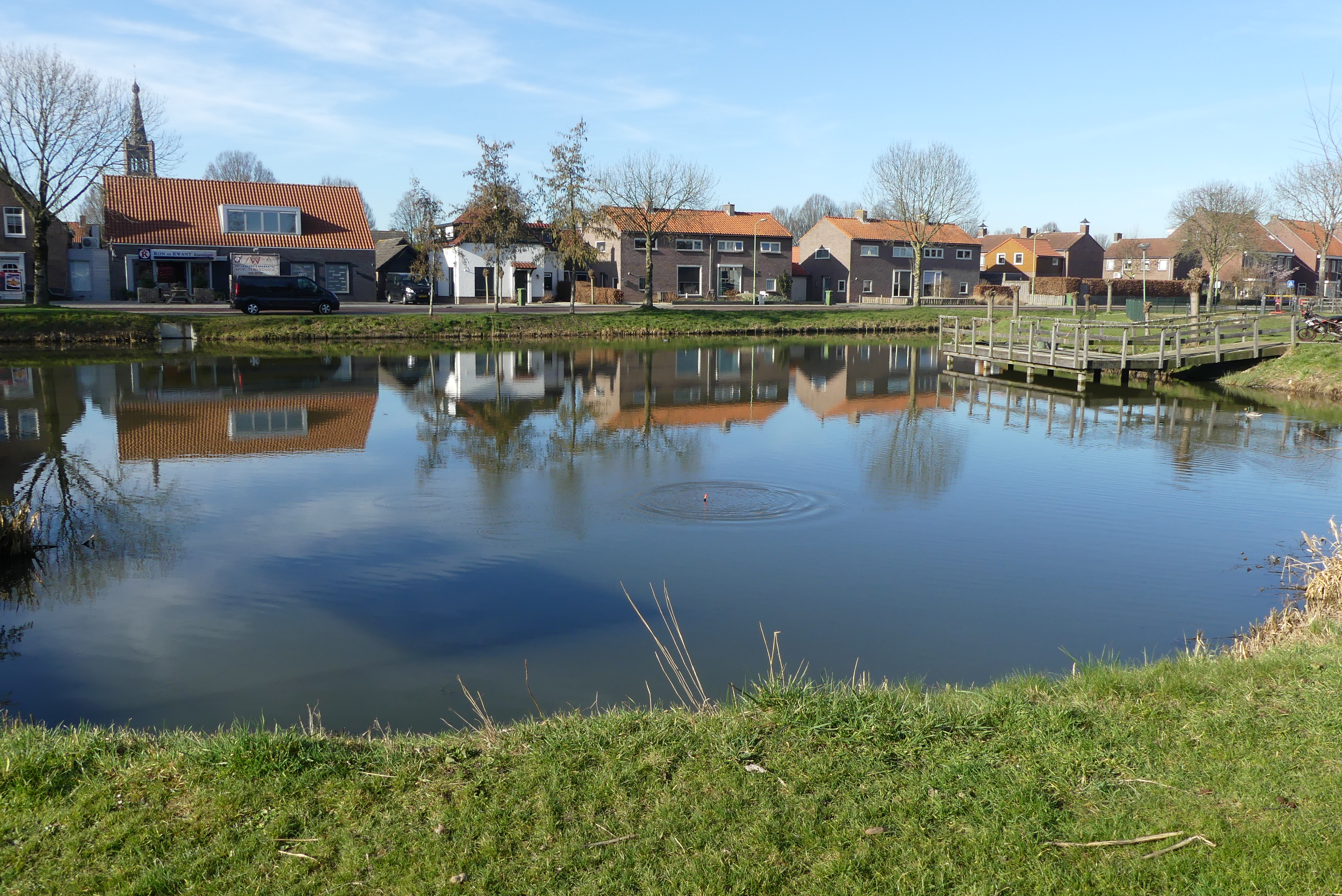
- View on Hank

- Location in the province of North Brabant in the Netherlands Hank (Netherlands)
- Coordinates: 51°44′N 4°54′E
- Country: Netherlands
- Province: North Brabant
- Municipality: Altena

Area
  - Total: 24.60 km^{2} (9.50 sq mi)
- Elevation: 0.4 m (1.3 ft)

Population (2021)
  - Total: 4,330
  - Density: 176/km^{2} (456/sq mi)
- Time zone: UTC+1 (CET)
  - Summer (DST): UTC+2 (CEST)
- Postal code: 4273
- Dialing code: 0162

Hank is a village in the Dutch province of North Brabant. It is a part of the municipality of Altena, and lies about 10 km (6 mi) north of Oosterhout. Hanks borders on De Biesbosch National Park.

It was first mentioned in 1851 as De Hank, and means "place where fishers dry their nets".

The area was poldered in 1188 and a little village called Heeraartswaarde and church were built. However the settlement was destroyed in the St. Elizabeth's flood of 1421. In 1863, a Catholic parish was founded as Mariapolder, and in 1896 a convent of the Sisters of Charity was established near the village. Hank was almost entirely destroyed in 1944 during World War II and was rebuilt after the war.

== Gallery ==
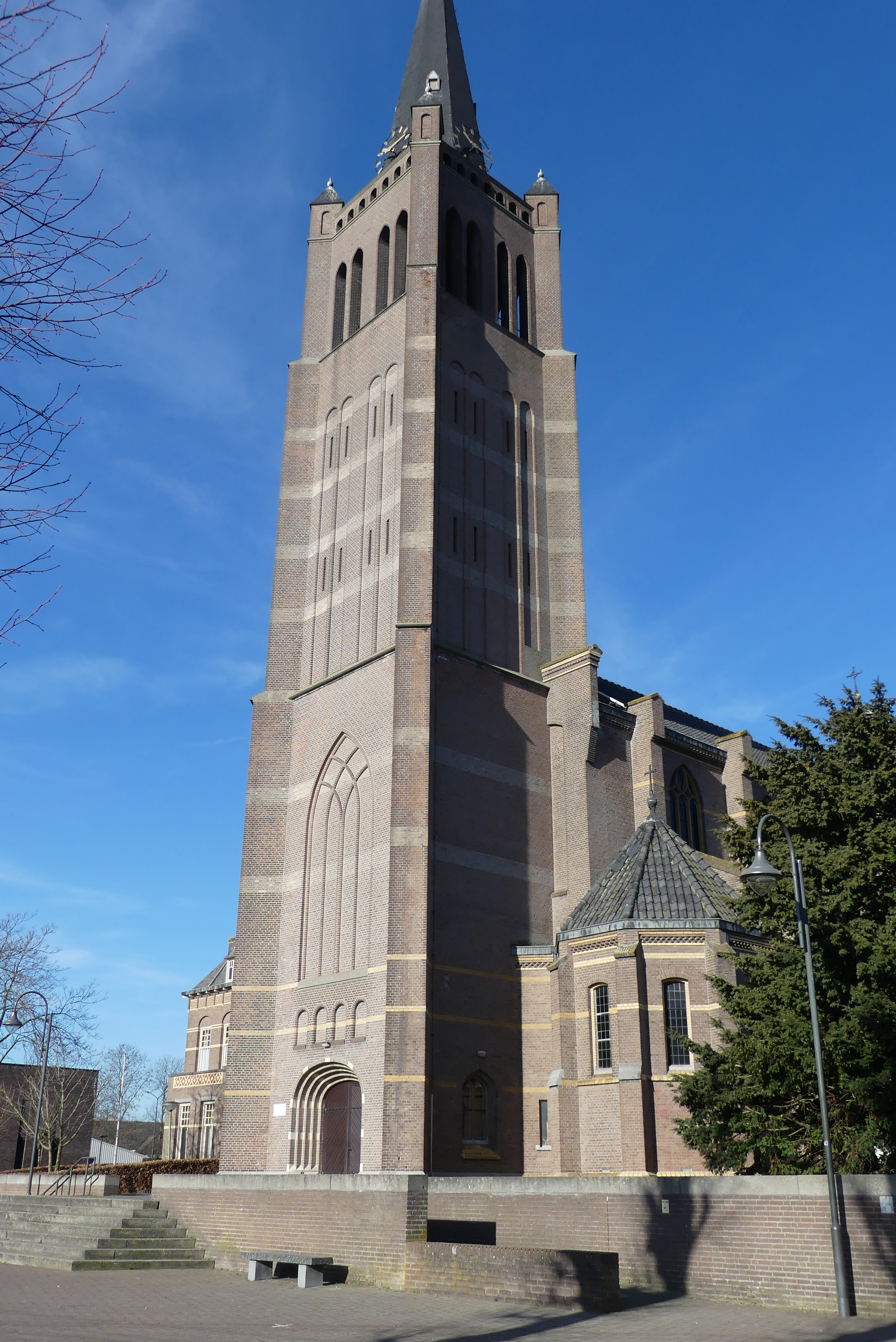
Catholic church

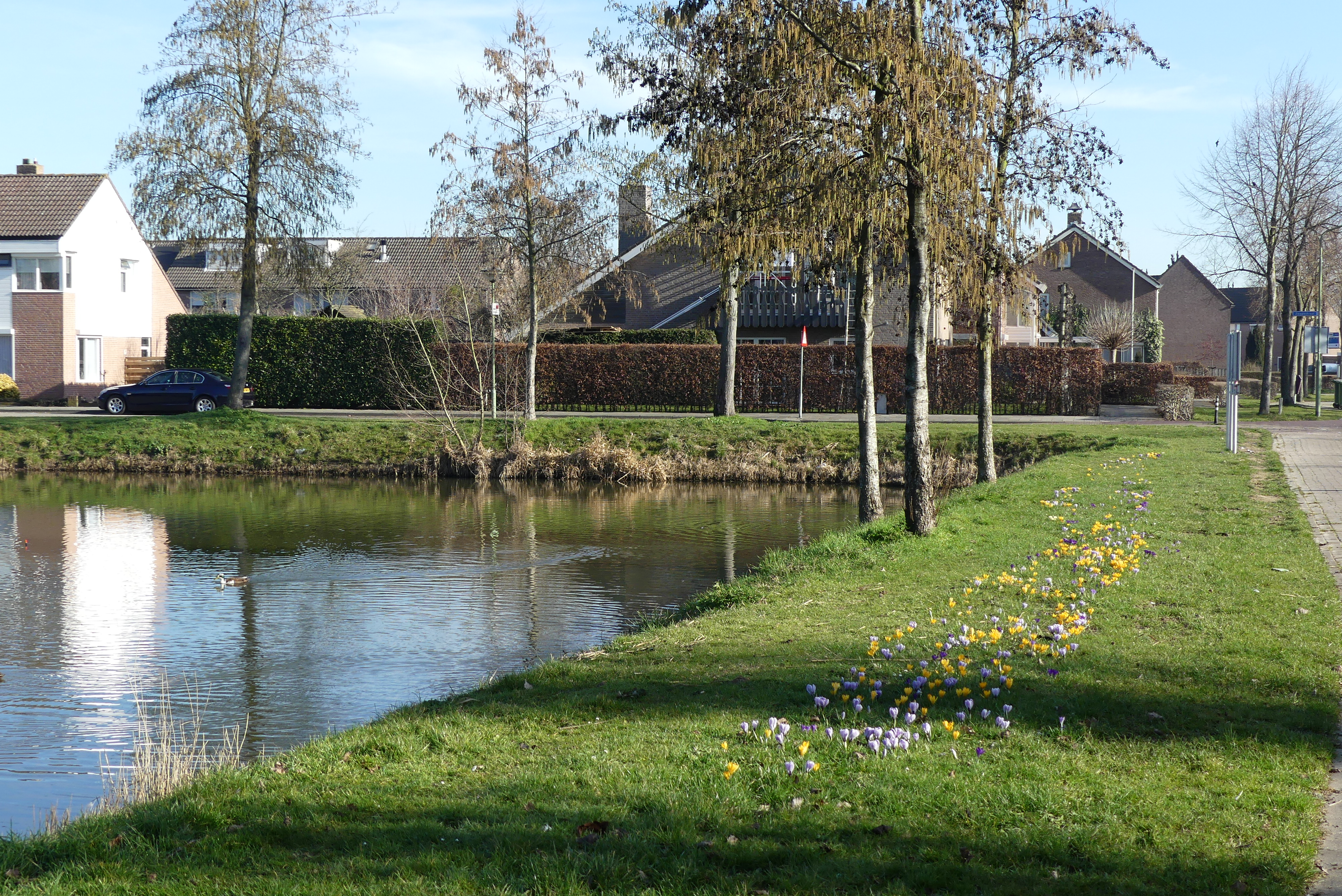
Pond in Hank

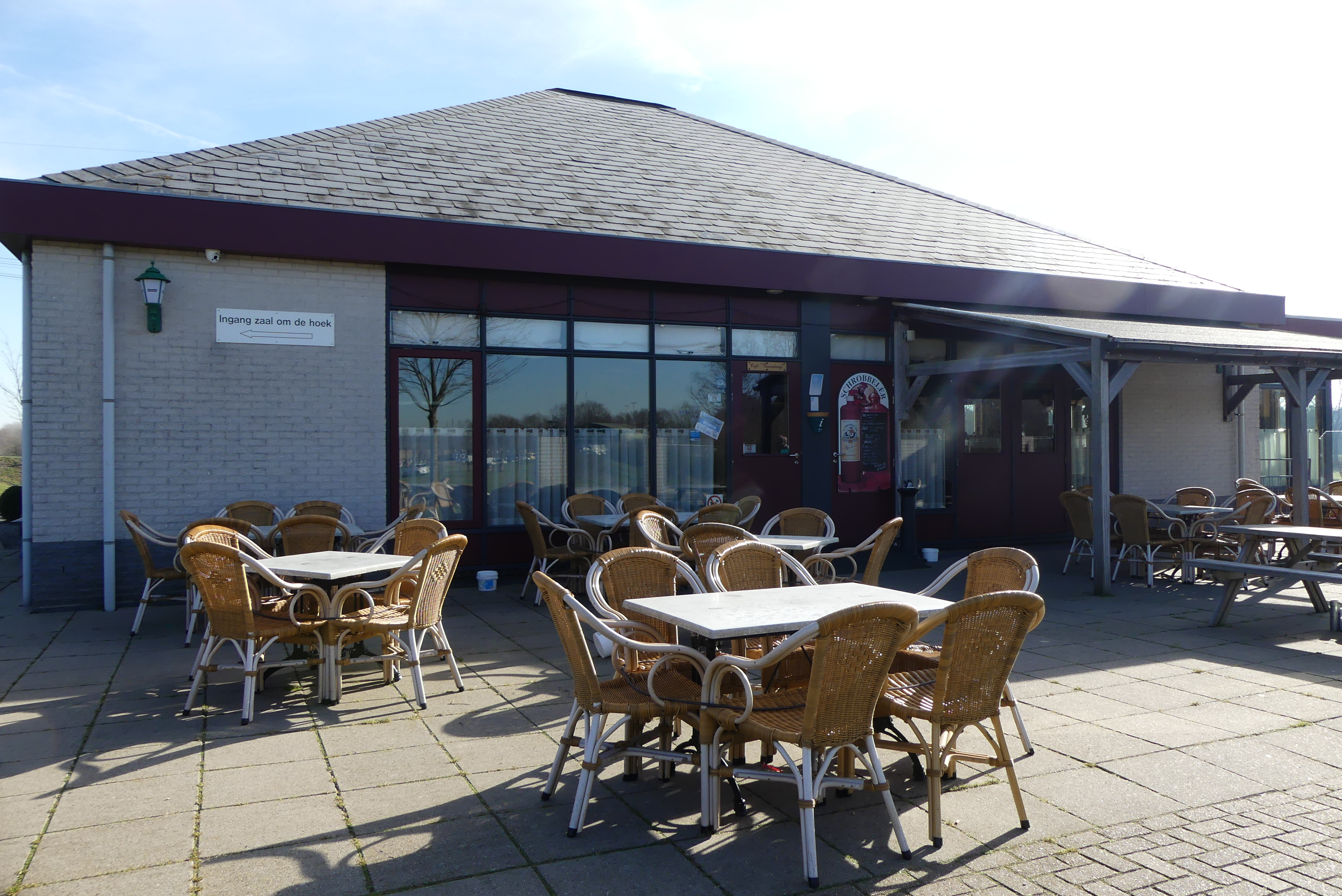
Cafeteria near the marina

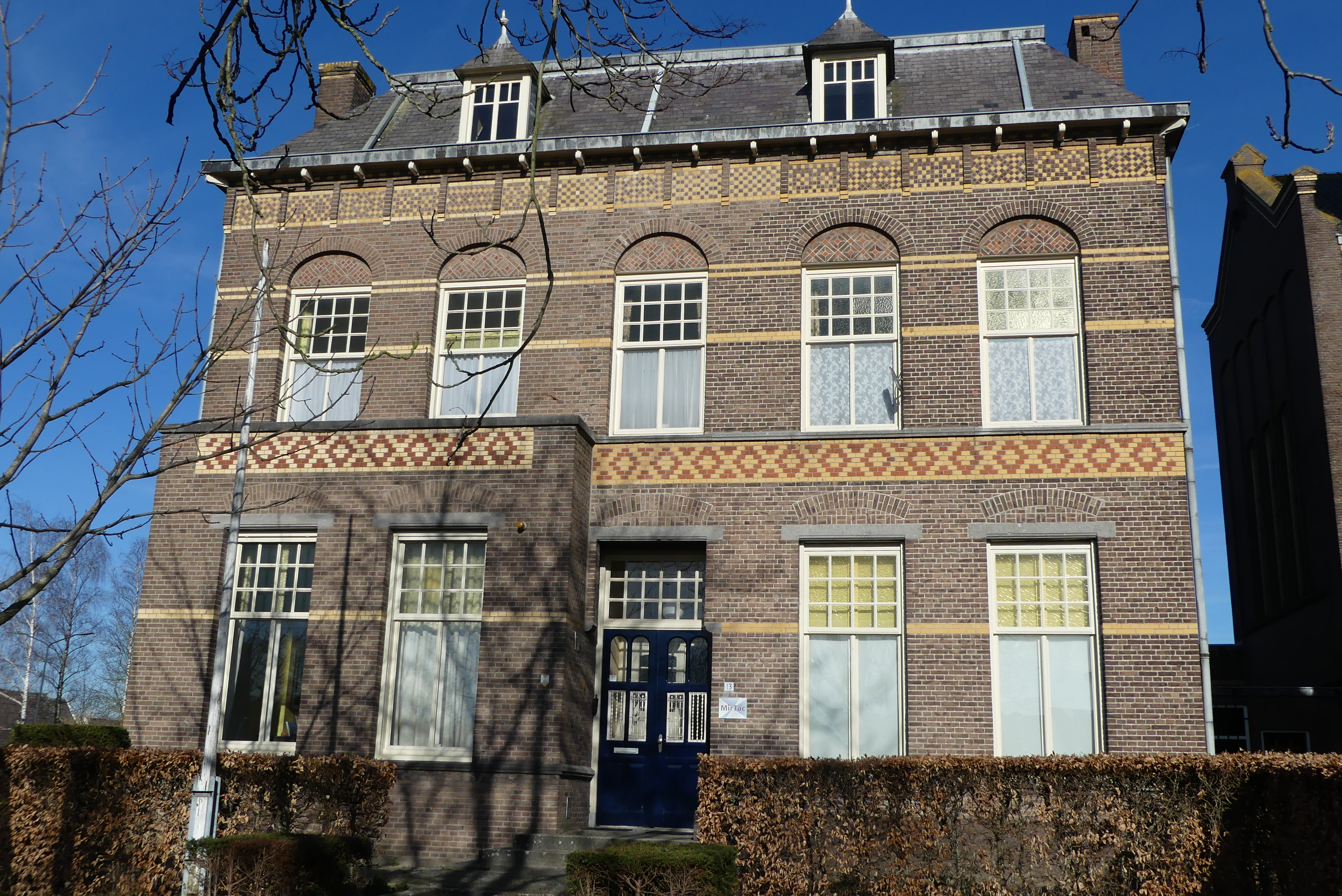
House in Hank
