= Rijswijk, North Brabant =

Rijswijk
- Village
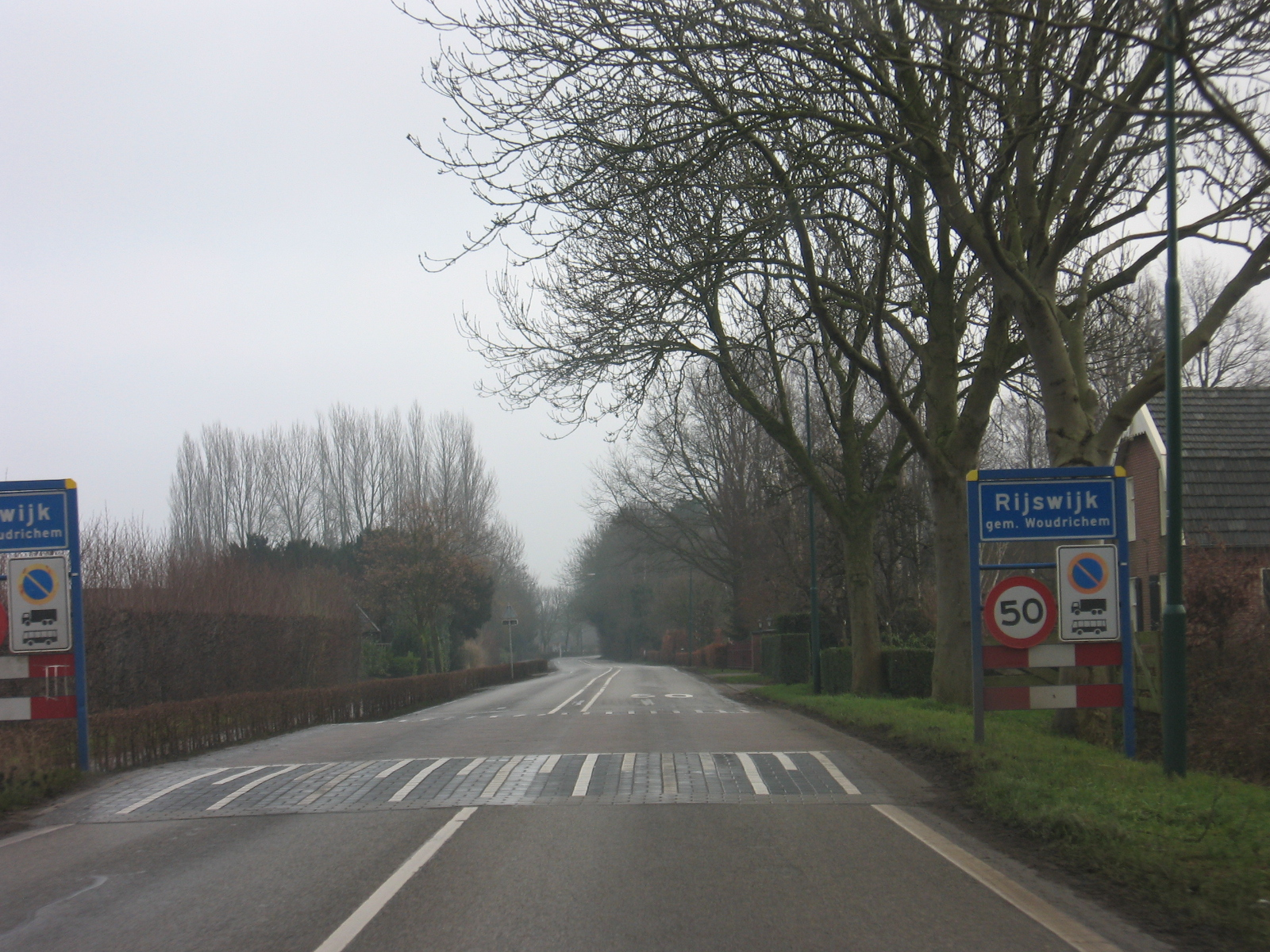
- Entrance of Rijswijk

- Flag Coat of arms

- Location in the province of North Brabant in the Netherlands Rijswijk (Netherlands)
- Coordinates: 51°47′51″N 5°1′25″E
- Country: Netherlands
- Province: North Brabant
- Municipality: Altena

Area
  - Total: 3.86 km^{2} (1.49 sq mi)
- Elevation: 1.3 m (4.3 ft)

Population (2021)
  - Total: 1,855
  - Density: 481/km^{2} (1,240/sq mi)
- Time zone: UTC+1 (CET)
  - Summer (DST): UTC+2 (CEST)
- Postal code: 4284
- Dialing code: 0183

Rijswijk is a village in the Dutch province of North Brabant. It is located in the municipality of Altena, about 5 km southeast of Gorinchem.

== History ==
The village was first mentioned in the 12th century as Riswic, the name being a combination of neighbourhood and twigs.

Slotje Rijswijk is a castle which probably dated from the 14th century. It used to have a tower, however it has been demolished. In 1760, an estate was built on the location, using the foundations of the former castle.

The Dutch Reformed church was originally built before 1369. Remains have been discovered of a church dating from around 1100. In 1809, it was destroyed by a flood, replaced by a new church, and restored in 1999 and 2000.

Rijswijk was home to 306 people in 1840. Rijswijk was a separate municipality until 1973, when it became part of Woudrichem. Rijswijk and neighbouring Giessen have grown into a single urban area. In 2019 Rijswijk became part of Altena by the merger of the municipalities Aalburg, Werkendam and Woudrichem.

== Gallery ==
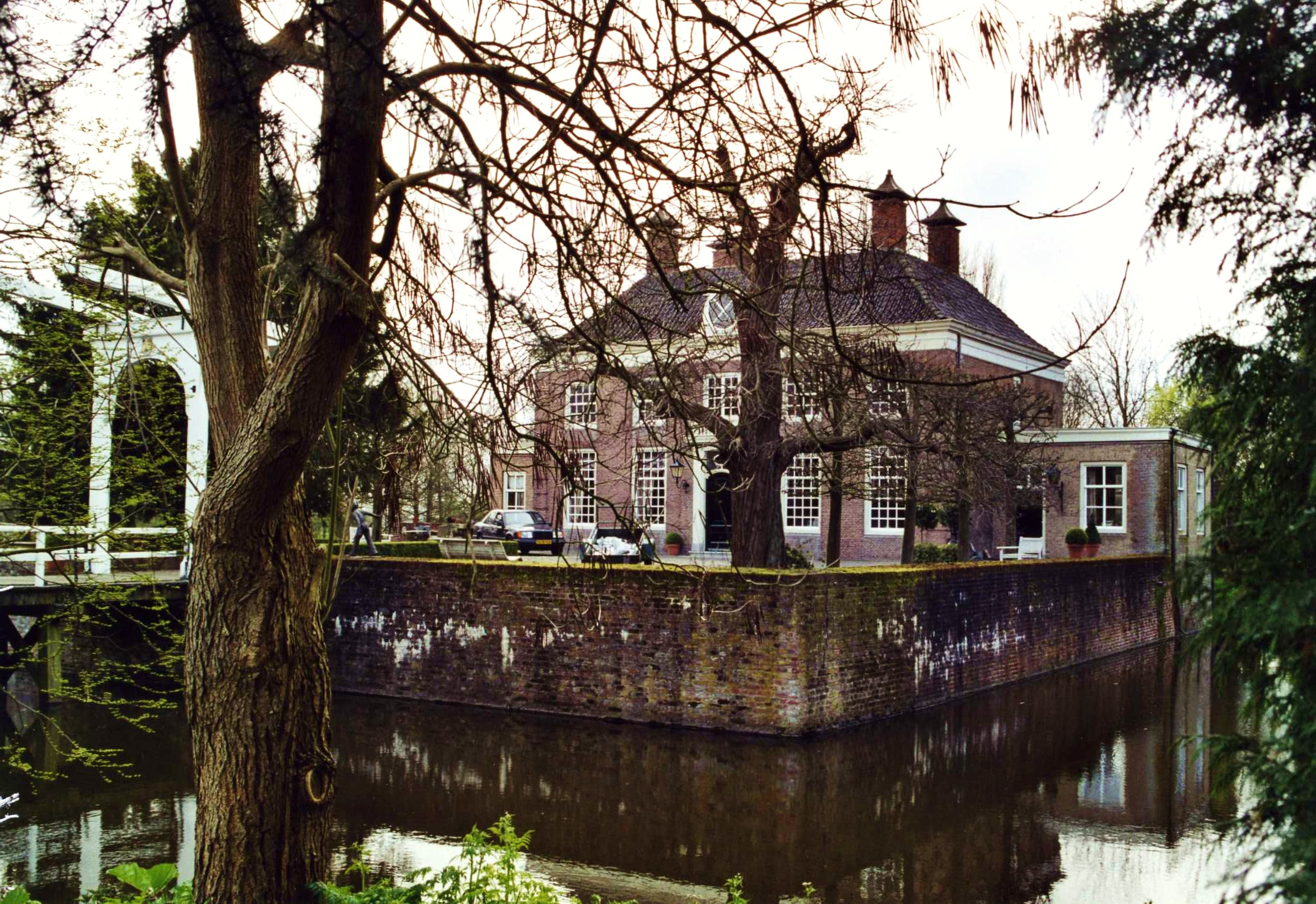
Slot Rijswijk

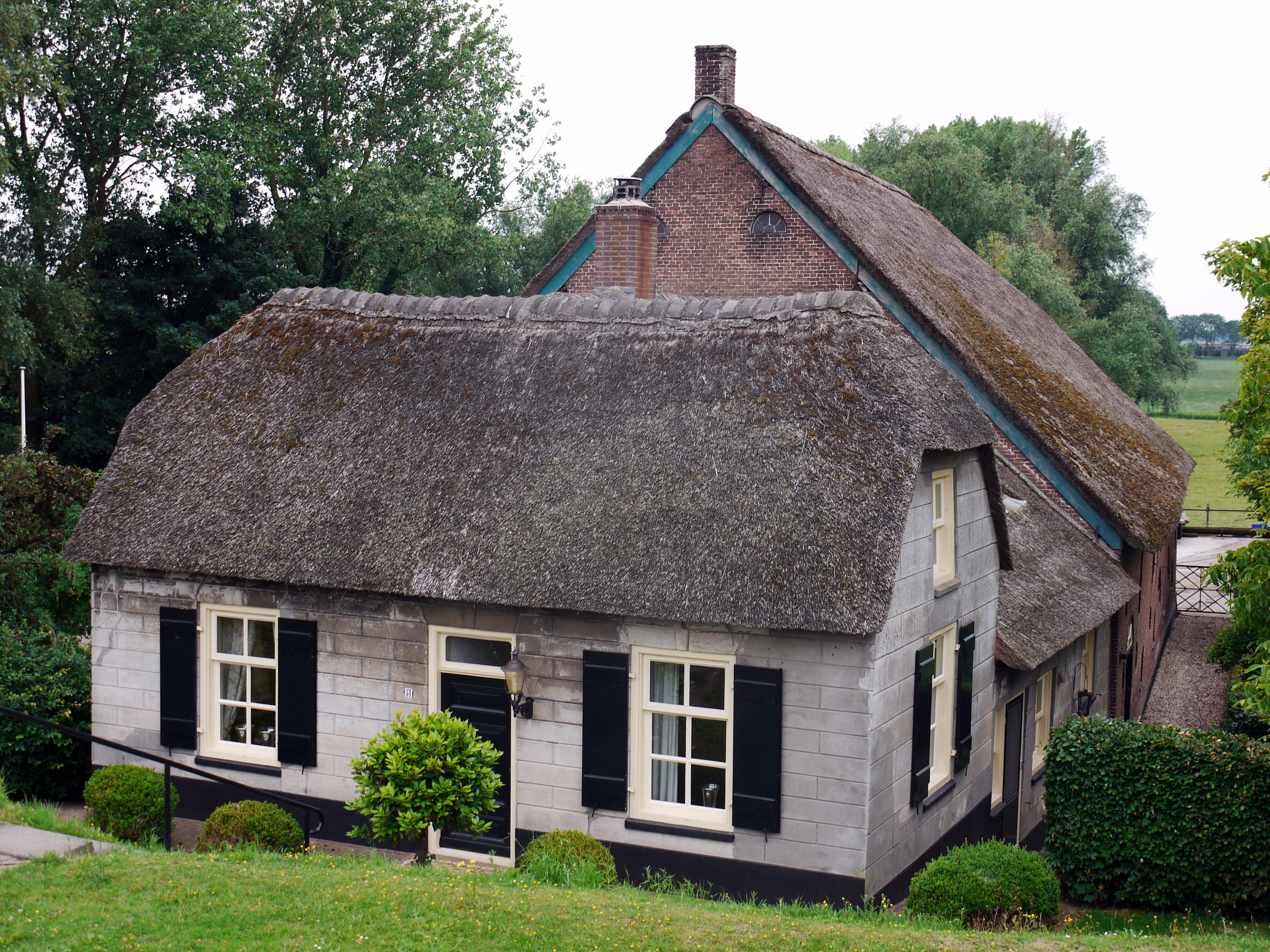
Farm in Rijswijk

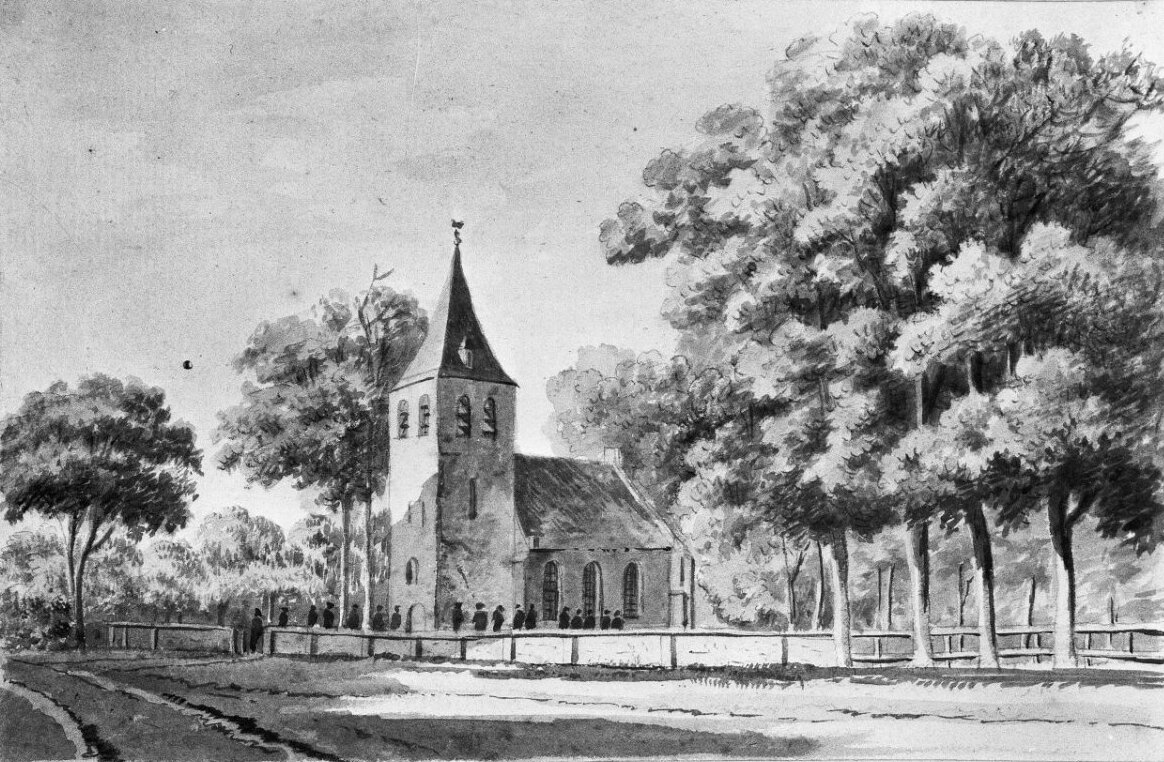
Drawing of the church (1789)
