= De Werken en Sleeuwijk =

Coordinates: 51.813072°N 4.92239°E

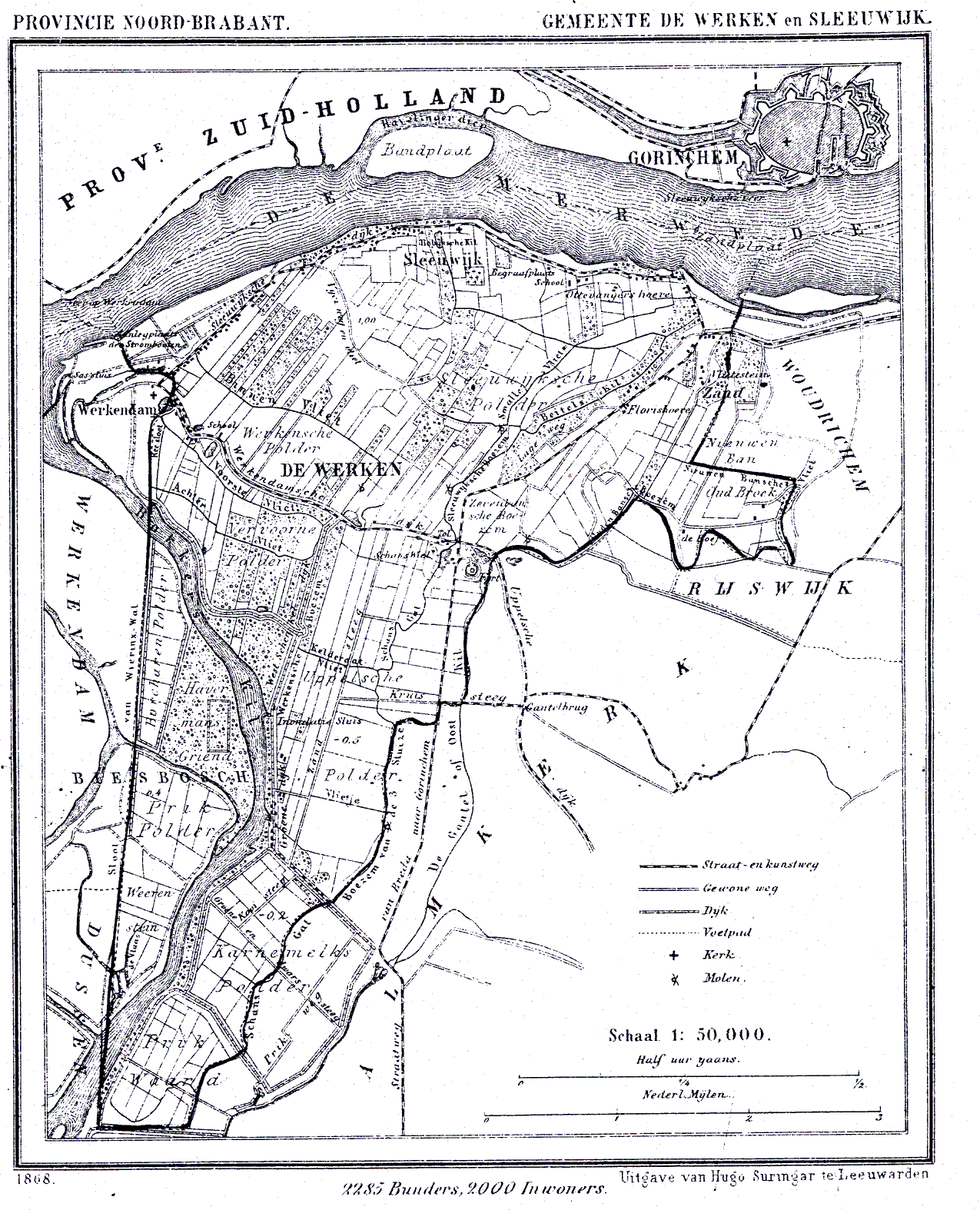
Map of Sleeuwijk, 1868

De Werken en Sleeuwijk was a municipality in the Dutch province of North Brabant. It covered the village of Sleeuwijk, and the small river De Werken.

The municipality existed until 1950, when it became part of Werkendam.
