= Sleeuwijk =

- Village
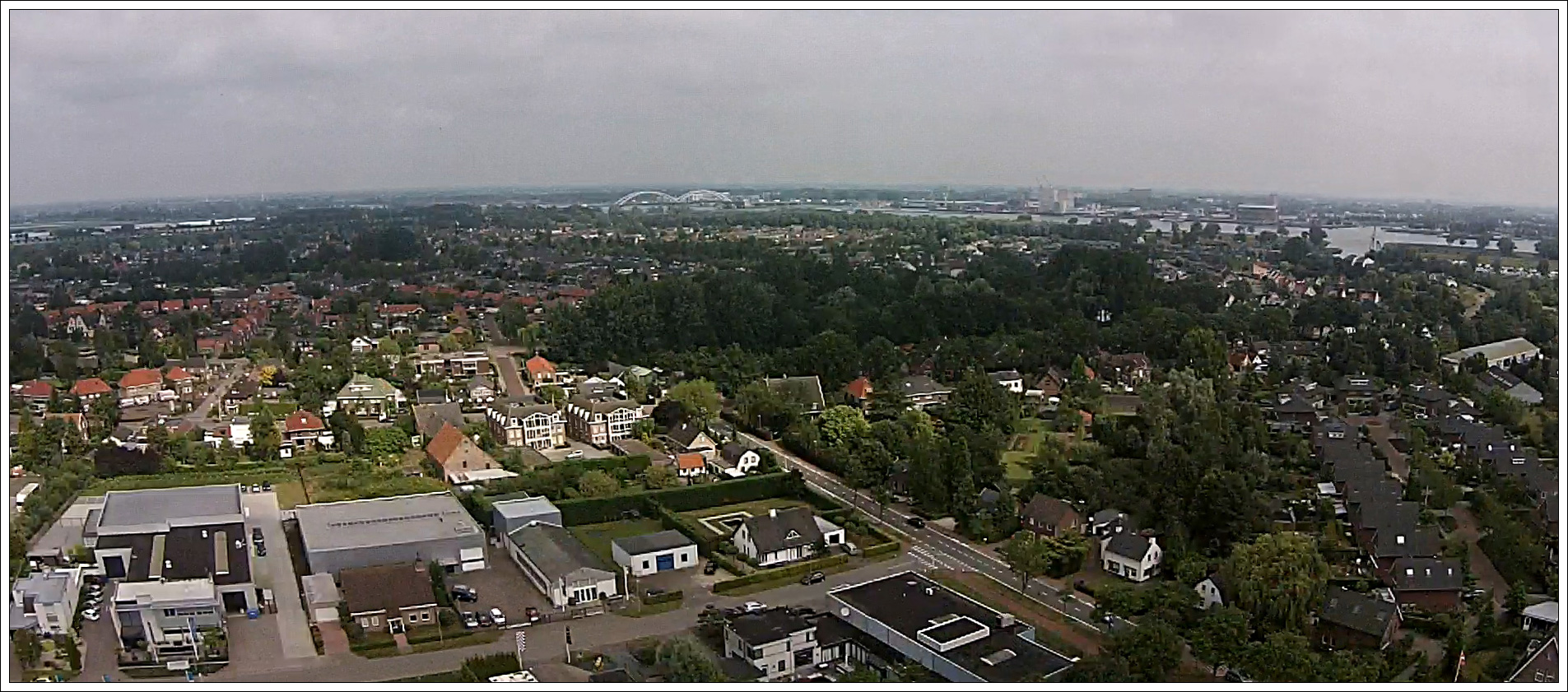
- Aerial view

- Location in the province of North Brabant in the Netherlands Sleeuwijk (Netherlands)
- Coordinates: 51°49′N 4°57′E
- Country: Netherlands
- Province: North Brabant
- Municipality: Altena

Area
  - Total: 9.71 km^{2} (3.75 sq mi)
- Elevation: 0.2 m (0.66 ft)

Population (2021)
  - Total: 5,865
  - Density: 604/km^{2} (1,560/sq mi)
- Time zone: UTC+1 (CET)
  - Summer (DST): UTC+2 (CEST)
- Postal code: 4254
- Dialing code: 0183

Sleeuwijk is a village in the Dutch province of North Brabant and part of the municipality of Altena.

== History ==
The village was first mentioned in 1268 as "Tyberio de Slewijck" and is a combination of neighbourhood and blunt. The village is known for its ferry to Gorinchem which has been known to exist since 1327. During the 20th century, the ferry caused long delays, and was replaced by the Merwedebrug in 1961. In 2017, it was announced that the Merwedebrug would be replaced by a wider bridge, because it has become too narrow.

Historically, it was part of the Land of Altena and was administered by Woudrichem. Since about 1815, Sleeuwijk had been part of the municipality of De Werken en Sleeuwijk. Sleeuwijk was home to 380 people in 1840. This had an area of 2,111 ha. In 1950, the then 4,218-inhabitants municipality was merged into the municipality of Werkendam, a municipality which was greatly enlarged in 1973. In 2012, the village had 5,349 inhabitants.

== Overview ==
The village is home to various sports clubs, including tennis, swimming, ice skating and korfball, two primary and two secondary schools and a number of shops in the shopping centre called de Nieuwe Es.

== Gallery ==
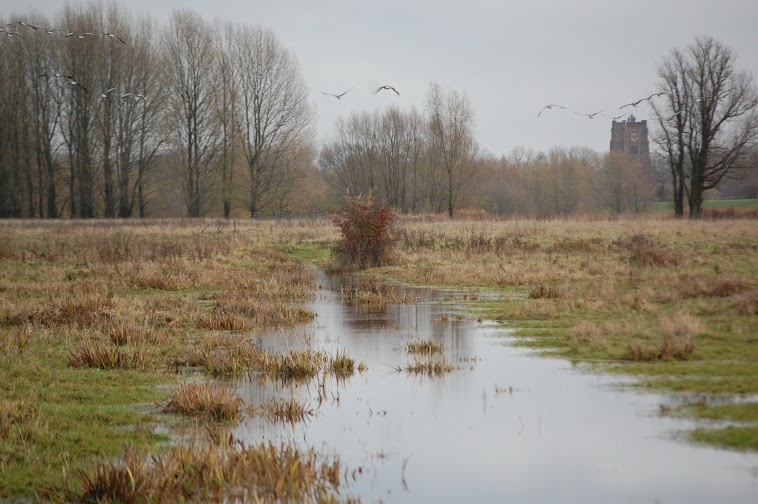
Nature area Groesplaat

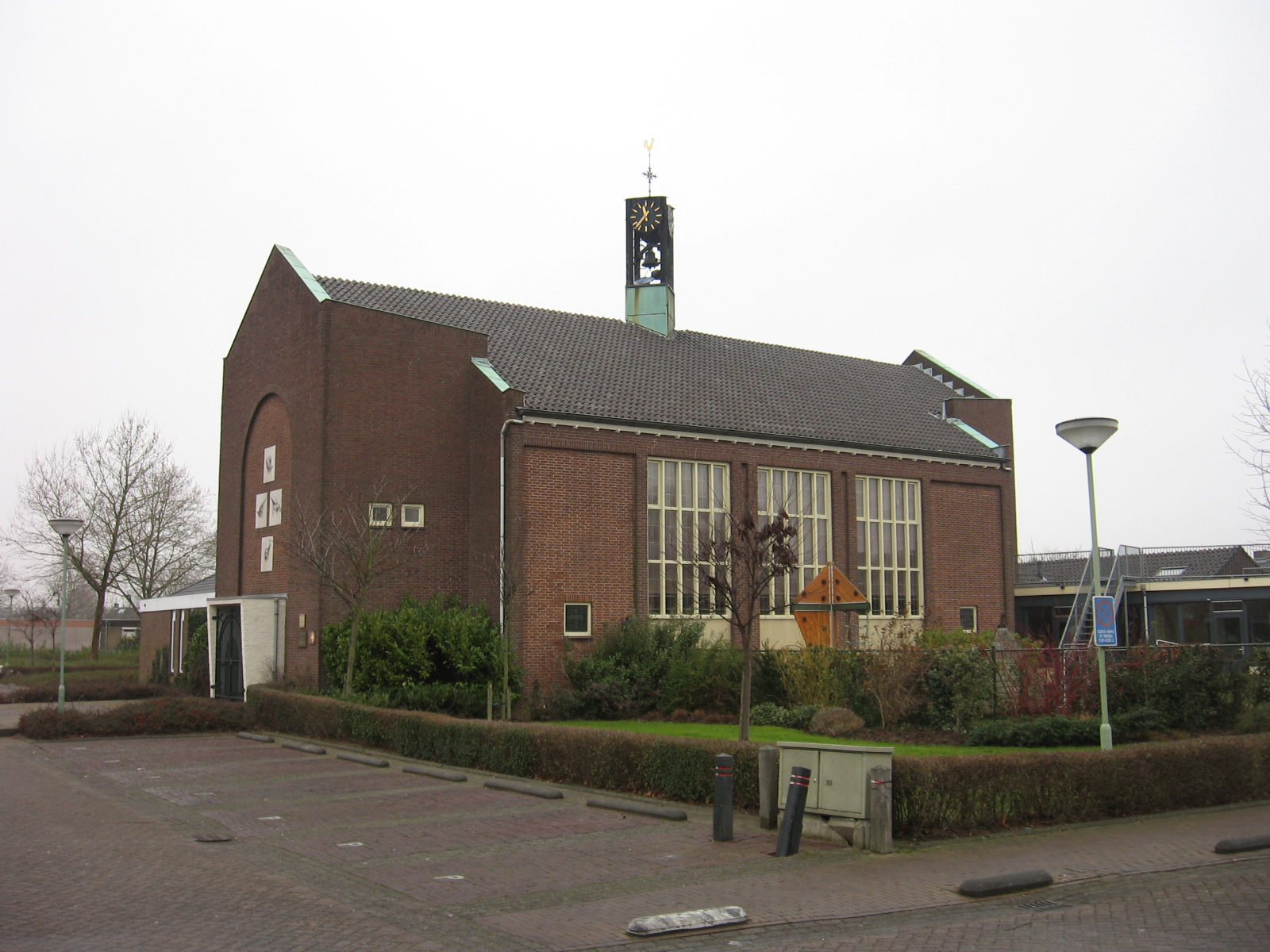
Church of Sleeuwijk

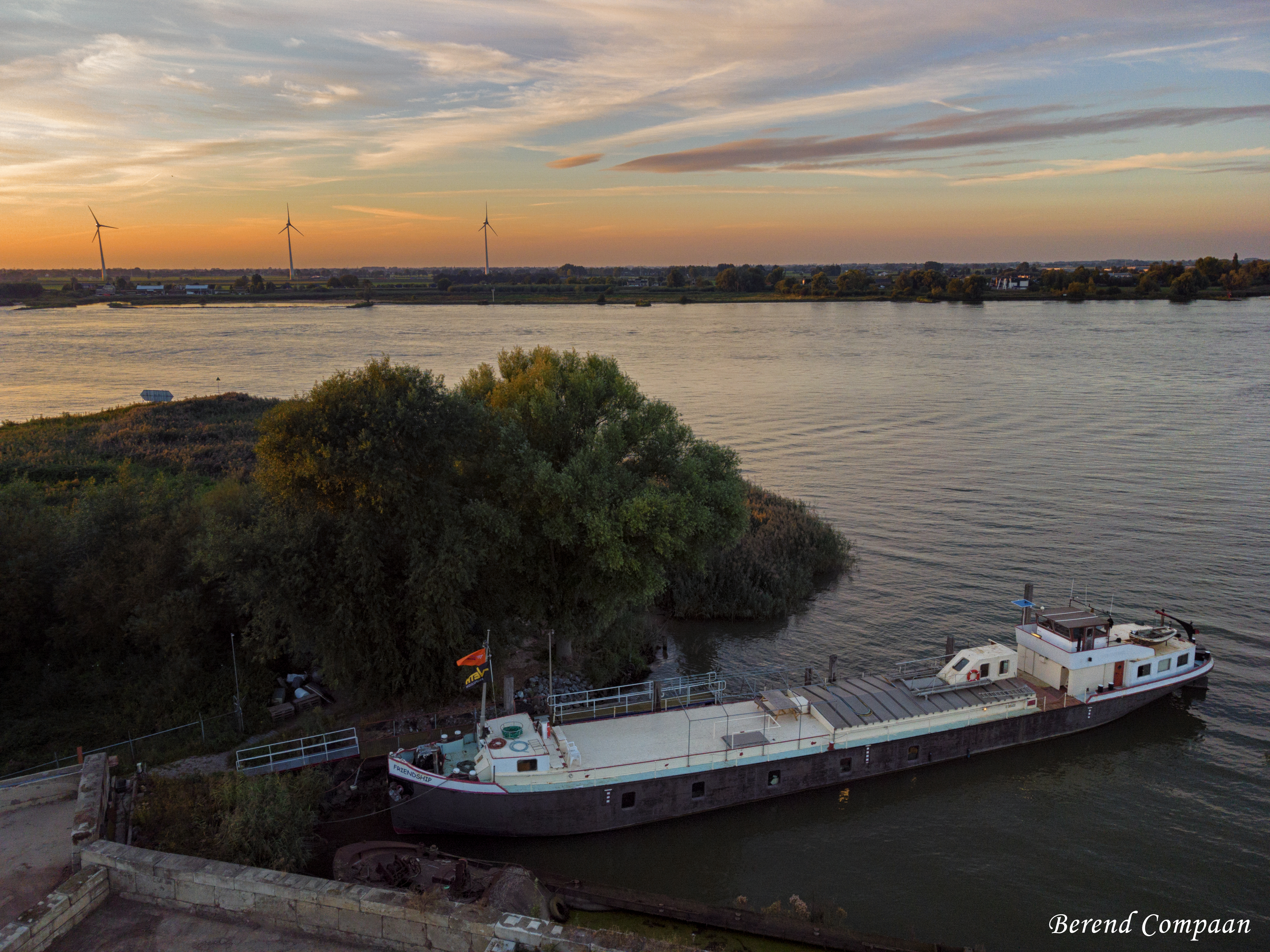
River view

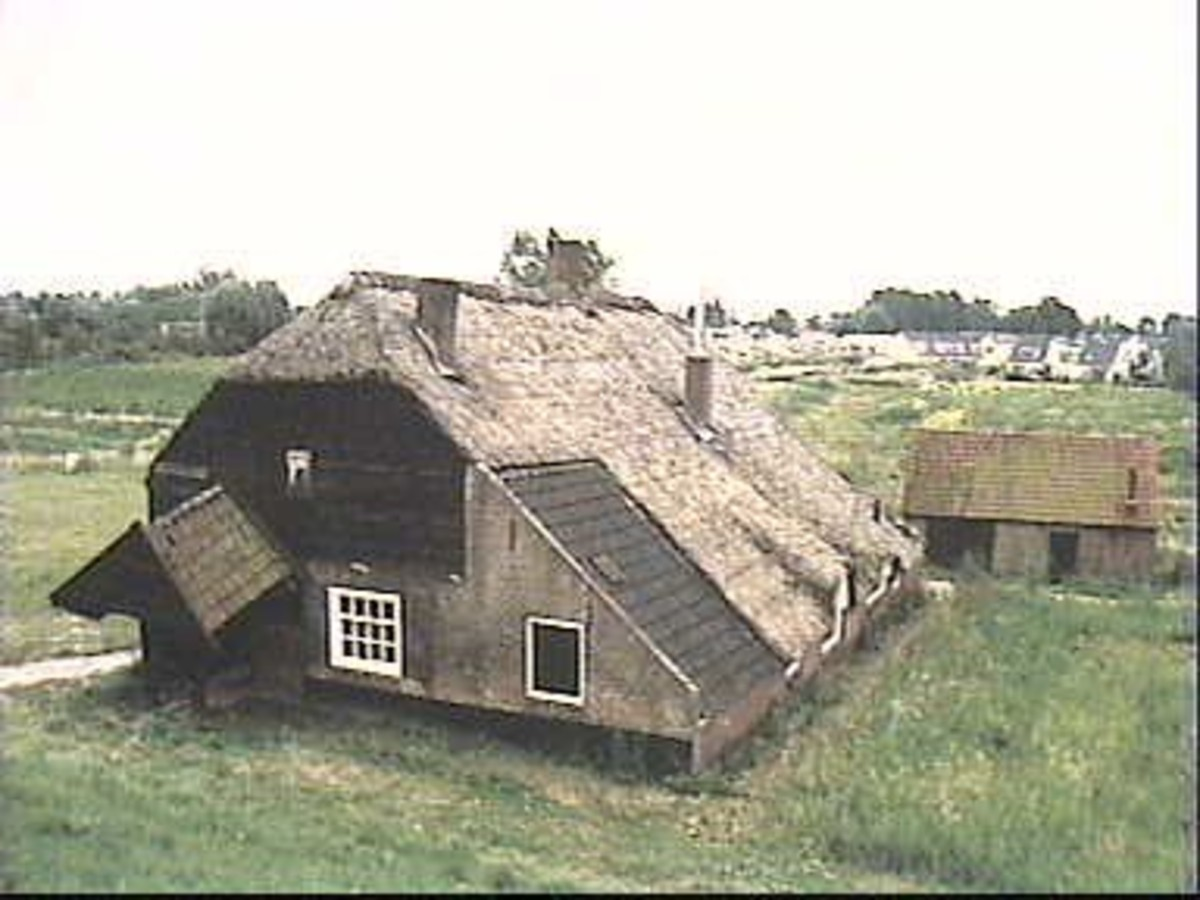
Farm in Sleeuwijk
