= Ministries of the Netherlands =

The most influential part of the executive of the Government of the Netherlands are the ministries. There are twelve ministries of the Netherlands, all with their own minister. There are also several ministers without portfolio and State Secretaries.

The names and responsibilities of the various ministries have undergone frequent change in the period 1980–2014.

== List ==
Ministries		Responsibilities	Agencies / Independent Agencies	Minister
General Affairs (Dutch: Algemene Zaken)	AZ	Government policy • Planning • Information • Dutch royal house	• Cabinet Office • Government Information Service • Scientific Council for Government Policy • Review Committee on the Intelligence and Security Services	Rob Jetten as Prime Minister and Minister of General Affairs
Interior and Kingdom Relations (Dutch: Binnenlandse Zaken en Koninkrijksrelaties)	BZK	Domestic policy • Civil service • Public administration • Elections • Local governments • Intelligence • Kingdom Relations • Housing policy • Spatial planning	• Safety Board • General Intelligence and Security Service • Electoral Council • PKIoverheid	Pieter Heerma as Minister of the Interior and Kingdom Relations
Foreign Affairs (Dutch: Buitenlandse Zaken)	BZ	Foreign relations • Foreign policy • International development • International trade • European Union • NATO • Benelux • Diaspora	• Diplomatic Service • Center for the Promotion of Imports	Tom Berendsen as Minister of Foreign Affairs
Finance (Dutch: Financiën)	FIN	Economic policy • Monetary policy • Fiscal policy • Tax policy • Incomes policy • Financial market • Regulations • Government budget	• Tax and Customs Administration • Fiscal Information and Investigation Service • Authority for the Financial Markets	Eelco Heinen as Minister of Finance
Justice and Security (Dutch: Justitie en Veiligheid)	J&V	Justice system • Law enforcement • Public security • Emergency management • Counter-terrorism • Legal aid • Drug policy • Incarcerations • Immigration policy	• National Police Corps • Public Prosecution Service • National Coordinator for Security and Counterterrorism • Forensic Institute • Custodial Institutions Agency • Immigration and Naturalisation Service	David van Weel as Minister of Justice and Security
Economic Affairs and Climate Policy (Dutch: Economische Zaken en Klimaat)	EZ	Commercial policy • Industrial policy • Investment policy • Technology policy • Mining • Trade • Space policy • Natural resource • Tourism • Environmental policy • Climate change policy • Renewable energy policy	• Foreign Investment Agency • Space Office • Bureau for Economic Policy Analysis • Department of Nuclear Safety, Security and Safeguards • Patent Office • Central Agency for Statistics • Environmental Assessment Agency • Environmental Protection Agency	Heleen Herbert as Minister of Economic Affairs and Climate Policy
Defence (Dutch: Defensie)	DEF	Armed forces • Military policy • National security • Veterans Affairs • Military police • Defence diplomacy • Humanitarian aid	• Army • Navy • Air Force • Marechaussee • Coastguard • Military Intelligence and Security Service	Dilan Yeşilgöz as Minister of Defence
Health, Welfare and Sport (Dutch: Volksgezondheid, Welzijn en Sport)	VWS	Health care • Health policy • Health insurance • Pharmaceutical policy • Vaccination policy • Welfare • Biomedical sciences • Sport	• Health Council • Institute for Public Health and the Environment • Health Care Inspectorate	Sophie Hermans as Minister of Health, Welfare and Sport
Social Affairs and Employment (Dutch: Sociale Zaken en Werkgelegenheid)	SZW	Social policy • Employment • Labour economics • Occupational safety and health • Social security • Consumer protection • Trade unions • Trade associations • Emancipation	• Social and Economic Council • Netherlands Labour Authority	Hans Vijlbrief as Minister of Social Affairs and Employment
Education, Culture and Science (Dutch: Onderwijs, Cultuur en Wetenschap)	OCW	Education policy • Cultural policy • Science policy • Knowledge policy • Research • Innovation • Art • Gender equality • Communication • Media	• Education Executive Agency • Public Broadcasting Agency • National Archives • National Library • Equal Treatment Commission	Rianne Letschert as Minister of Education, Culture and Science
Infrastructure and Water Management (Dutch: Infrastructuur en Waterstaat)	I&W	Transport • Aviation • Public works • Water Management	• Rijkswaterstaat • Driving License and Certificates Agency • Meteorological Institute	Vincent Karremans as Minister of Infrastructure and Water Management
Agriculture, Fisheries, Food Security and Nature (Dutch: Landbouw, Visserij, Voedselzekerheid en Natuur)	LVVN	Agricultural policy • Food policy • Food safety • Fisheries • Natural conservation • Forestry • Animal welfare	• Food and Consumer Product Safety Authority	Jaimi van Essen as Minister of Agriculture, Fisheries, Food Security and Nature
