= Jean Rummenie =

Dutch civil servant and politician (born 1953)

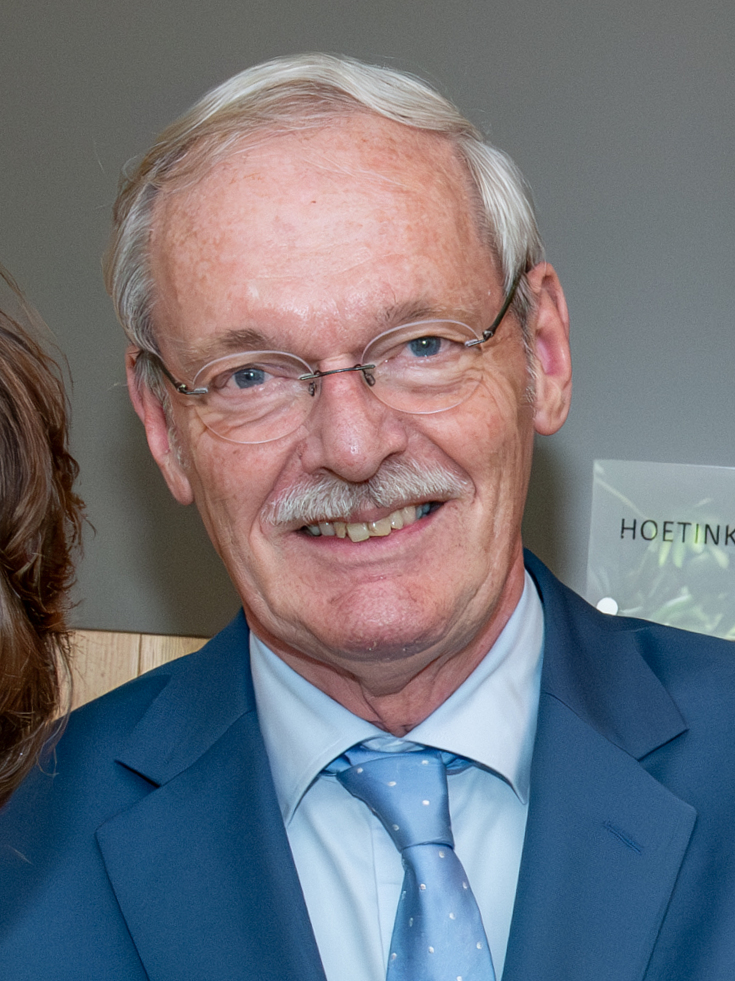
- Rummenie in 2025

State Secretary for Fisheries, Food Security and Nature
- In office 2 July 2024 – 23 February 2026
- Prime Minister: Dick Schoof
- Minister: Femke Wiersma
- Preceded by: Office established
- Succeeded by: Silvio Erkens

Personal details
- Born: Jean Frédéric Rummenie; 13 July 1953 (age 73) Amsterdam, Netherlands
- Party: Farmer–Citizen Movement
- Occupation: Politician; agricultural engineer; civil servant

Jean Frédéric Rummenie (Dutch: [ˈʑɑ̃ː ryməˈni]; born 13 July 1953) is a Dutch agricultural engineer, civil servant and politician of the Farmer–Citizen Movement (BBB). He has served as State Secretary for Fisheries, Food Security and Nature in the Schoof cabinet between July 2024 and February 2026.

== Career ==
An agricultural engineer, Rummenie had an extensive career at the Ministry of Agriculture. Besides roles in The Hague, he served as an agricultural attaché in Hungary, Poland, the United States, Argentina, Indonesia and Mexico. He was involved in negotiations to allow Dutch products to be sold internationally.

Rummenie ran for the House of Representatives in November 2023 as the eighth candidate of the Farmer–Citizen Movement (BBB). He was not elected, as his party secured seven seats. After the PVV, VVD, NSC, and BBB formed the Schoof cabinet, Rummenie was sworn in as State Secretary for Fisheries, Food Security and Nature on 2 July 2024. His portfolio includes fisheries, horticulture, NVWA, inspections, nature, biodiversity, and Staatsbosbeheer.

He outlined a plan to mitigate wolf-related nuisances following their re-settlement in the Netherlands years earlier, where they are protected under the Berne Convention. Rummenie suggested killing wolves that exhibit aggressive behavior toward humans or repeatedly attack protected livestock, and he proposed forming a team to assist farmers with installing fencing.

== Electoral history ==
Electoral history of Jean Rummenie
Year	Body	Party	Pos.	Votes	Result		Ref.
Year	Body	Party	Pos.	Votes	Party seats	Individual	Ref.
2023	House of Representatives	Farmer–Citizen Movement	8	342	7	Lost	
2025	House of Representatives	Farmer–Citizen Movement	13	320	4	Lost	

Political offices
Position established	State Secretary for Fisheries, Food Security and Nature; 2024–present	Incumbent
