= Waardhuizen =

- Village
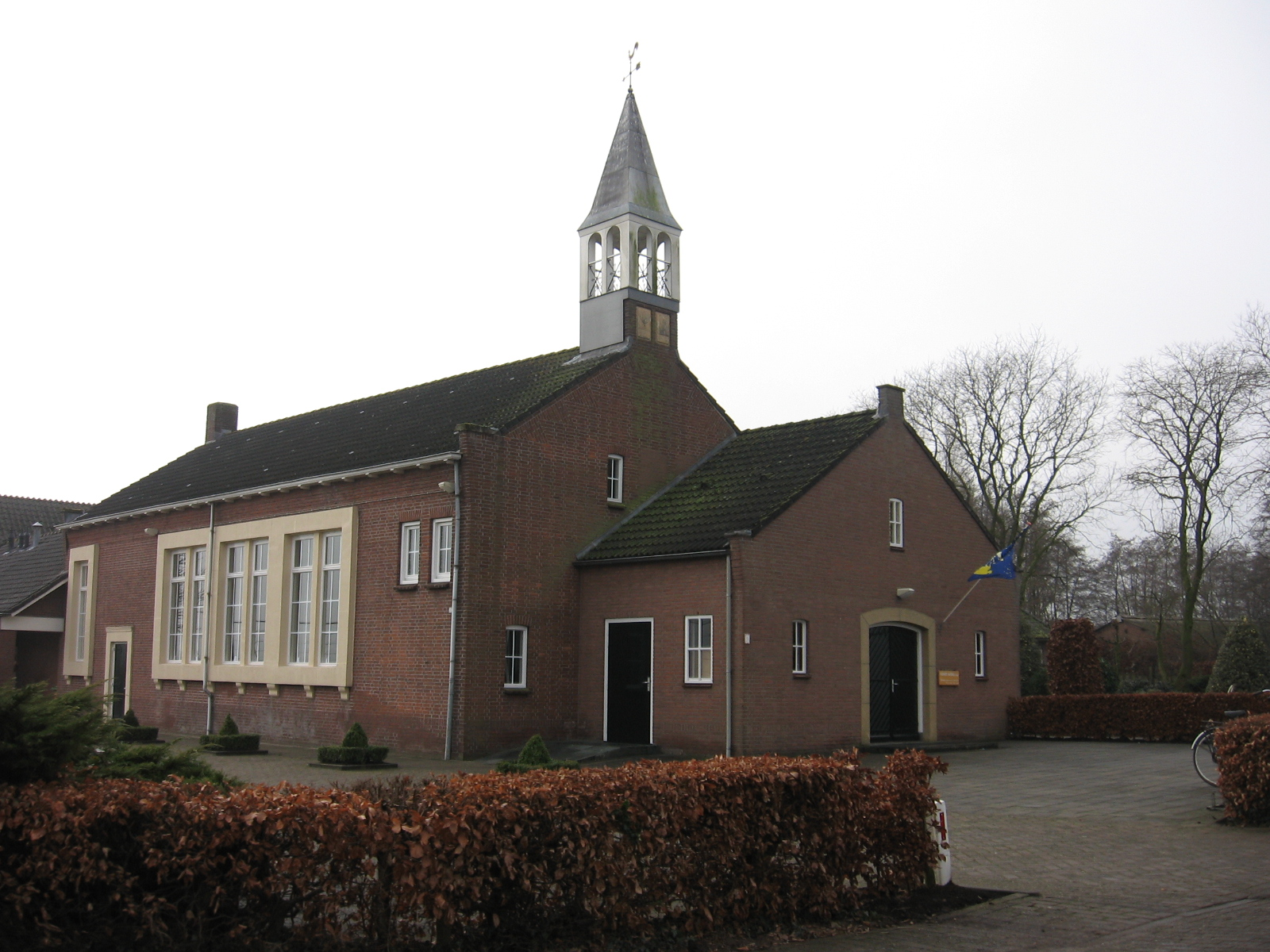
- A view of the former Reformed (Liberated) church building, demolished in 2020 to make way for a new church building.

- Location in the province of North Brabant in the Netherlands Waardhuizen (Netherlands)
- Coordinates: 51°46′37″N 5°00′36″E
- Country: Netherlands
- Province: North Brabant
- Municipality: Altena

Area
  - Total: 1.32 km^{2} (0.51 sq mi)
- Elevation: 0.6 m (2.0 ft)

Population (2021)
  - Total: 280
  - Density: 210/km^{2} (550/sq mi)
- Time zone: UTC+1 (CET)
  - Summer (DST): UTC+2 (CEST)
- Postal code: 4287
- Dialing code: 0183

Waardhuizen is a village in the municipality of Altena, in the province of North Brabant, Netherlands. It is about 4 km (2.5 mi) south of Woudrichem, as well as just south of Uitwijk. As of 2020, Waardhuizen had a population of 275.

== History ==
Waardhuizen was first mentioned in 1292 under the name "Werthuysen". It was a part of the municipality of Emmikhoven en Waardhuizen (also called Emmikhoven c.a. or just Emmikhoven), alongside the other namesake, Emmikhoven.

Emmikhoven en Waardhuizen merged into the municipality of Almkerk in 1879, the latter merged into the municipality of Woudrichem in 1973, which in turn merged into the municipality of Altena in 2019.

== Geography ==
Waardhuizen lies south of the Oude Alm stream, not far from the provincial border with South Holland and Utrecht. The hamlet of Stenenheul belongs to Waardhuizen.

== Notable people ==
- Louwrens Penning (1854–1927), popular Dutch novelist
- Carola Schouten (born 1977), Minister of Agriculture
- Raymond Schouten (born 1985), motorcycle racer
