= Uitwijk =

- Village
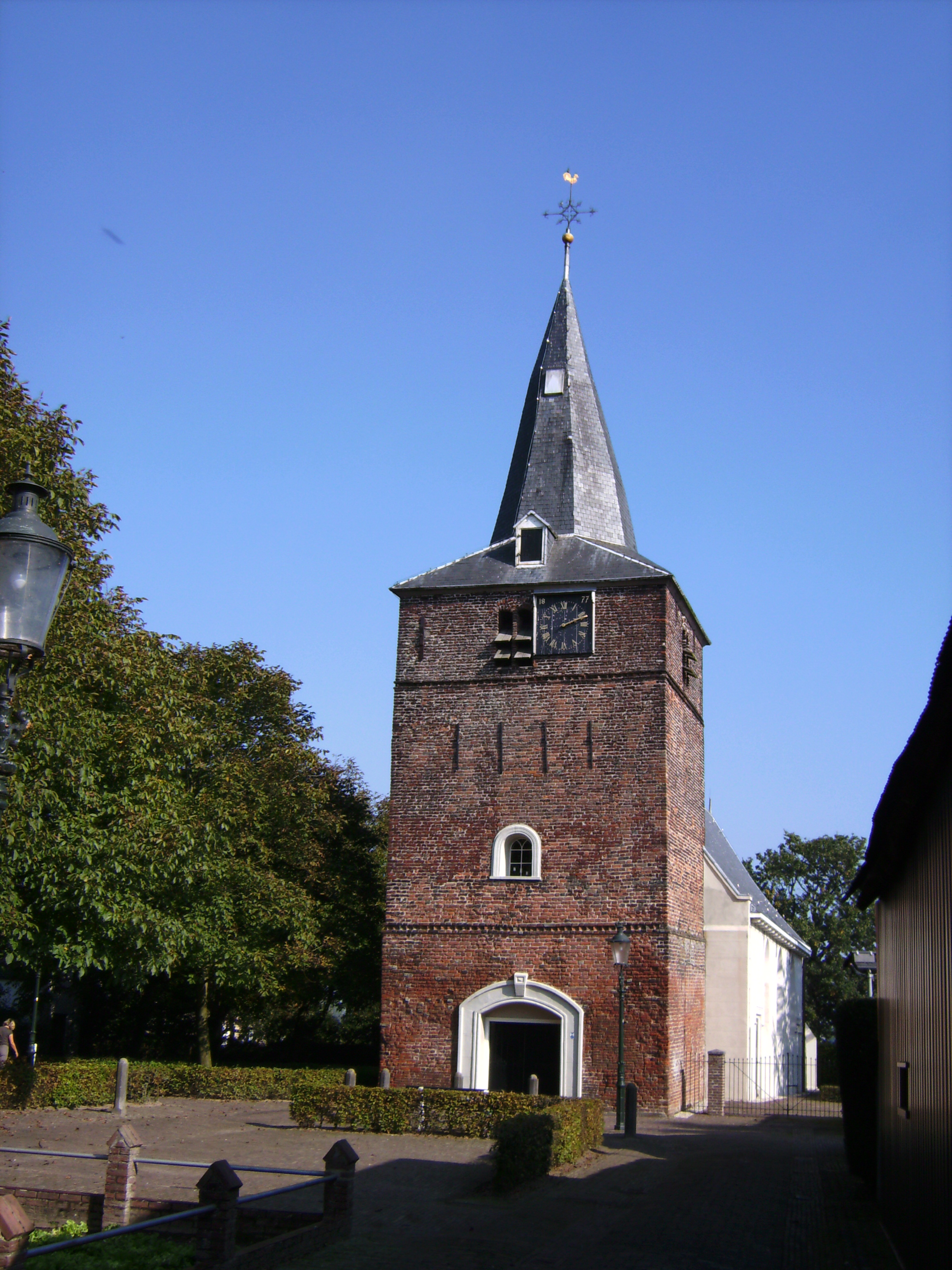
- Dutch Reformed church

- Location in the province of North Brabant in the Netherlands Uitwijk (Netherlands)
- Coordinates: 51°47′10″N 5°00′29″E
- Country: Netherlands
- Province: North Brabant
- Municipality: Altena

Area
  - Total: 4.26 km^{2} (1.64 sq mi)
- Elevation: 1.2 m (3.9 ft)

Population (2021)
  - Total: 340
  - Density: 80/km^{2} (210/sq mi)
- Time zone: UTC+1 (CET)
  - Summer (DST): UTC+2 (CEST)
- Postal code: 4288
- Dialing code: 0183

Uitwijk is a village in the municipality of Altena, in the Netherlands. It is located about 3 km south of Woudrichem, and just north of Waardhuizen. As of 2021, Uitwijk had 340 inhabitants.

== History ==
The village was first mentioned in 1108 as Hubertus de Utwic, and means "outward lying neighbourhood". Uitwijk is an esdorp which developed on a sandy ridge during the Middle Ages.

The tower of the Dutch Reformed church dates from around 1300. The nave was built around 1500, and the choir is from the early 16th century.

Uitwijk was home to 180 people in 1840, and was a part of the municipality of Almkerk (until the mid-19th century also called Almkerk en Uitwijk).

Almkerk merged into the municipality of Woudrichem in 1973, and the later merged into the municipality of Altena in 2019.

Uitwijk lies northwest of the Oude Alm stream. The hamlet of Eng belongs to Uitwijk.
