= Manure crisis in the Netherlands =

Anticipated manure surplus crisis in the Netherlands

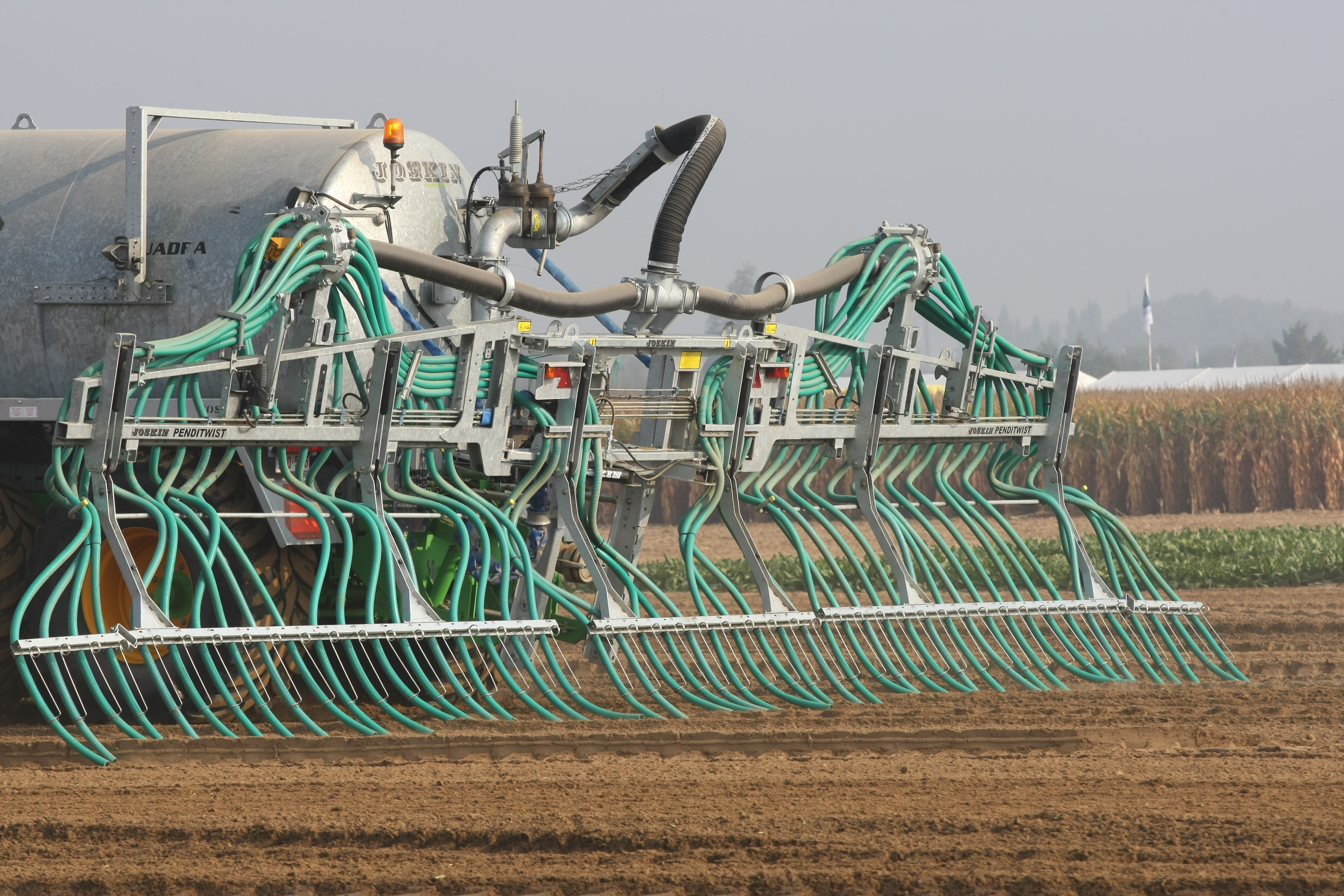
Fertilization of farmland with liquid manure

The manure crisis in the Netherlands (Dutch: mestcrisis) is an anticipated surge in the national surplus of manure. It is mainly caused by the phasing out of an exemption to the European Union's Nitrates Directive in the years 2023–2025. Because of this manure derogation, Dutch farmers had been allowed to exceed a limit on organic fertilization, intended to protect water resources from nutrient pollution, since 2006.

Due to its expiration, mainly dairy farmers would no longer be able to use all the manure produced to fertilize their lands, resulting in an anticipated yearly surplus of 95 kilotonnes (210×10^{6} lb) of nitrogen in 2026.

== Background ==
=== Water pollution and Nitrates Directive exemption ===
To combat nutrient pollution of water, the European Union enacted the Nitrates Directive in 1991. High contents of nitrate and phosphate in ground and surface water, mostly caused by agriculture, result in overgrowth of algae, also called algae blooms. This can lead to reduced biodiversity, increased methane emissions, and water that is less suitable for drinking and for recreational activities. Nitrates can enter bodies of water when agricultural lands are fertilized with manure, called organic fertilization, as crops do not absorb the full nitrogen content.

The Nitrates Directive has limited the use of organic fertilizer to 170 kilograms per hectare (150 lb/acre), where the weight refers to its reactive nitrogen contents. Grasslands, especially prevalent among dairy farmers and fast-growing in the Dutch climate, absorb more nitrogen compared to cropland, and the Netherlands was exempted from the regulation starting in 2006. Farmers were allowed to use between 35% and 47% more organic fertilizer on their land, resulting in more intensive dairy farming. The directive initially led to less nitrates seeping into bodies of water, but this reduction later stagnated, and ground and surface water levels of nitrate and phosphate remained above limits in about half of the country. Furthermore, the European Commission repeatedly found widespread violations of the fertilization limits through regulatory fraud.

The exemption from the Nitrates Directive, referred to as the manure derogation, was extended several times. European Commissioner Virginijus Sinkevičius rejected the Netherlands's proposal for another extension in late 2021, citing worsening water quality and a lack of measures to lower livestock density. Agriculture minister Henk Staghouwer of the fourth Rutte cabinet promised that the Netherlands would commit itself to extensive farming, and he predicted that the Dutch livestock population would decline by 30% as a result of its measures to tackle the nitrogen crisis. After Prime Minister Mark Rutte stressed the issue's importance to European Commission President Ursula von der Leyen, the European Commission agreed in September 2022 that the Netherlands could phase out its derogation over the years 2023–2025. The agreement also included the creation of buffer zones around watercourses in which no fertilization would be allowed as well as the designation of some areas as nutrient-polluted. The latter would have a quicker phasing out of the derogation and a ceiling on total fertilizer usage (including artificial fertilizer). The initial zones included sandy and loess soils in Overijssel, Gelderland, Utrecht, North Brabant, and Limburg in addition to three more areas, covering a combined 40% of the surface area of the Netherlands.

On 6 December 2023, agriculture minister Piet Adema announced that the areas designated as nutrient-polluted would be expanded to cover 60% of the Netherlands. This mostly affected the Groene Hart as well as the provinces of Zeeland, Flevoland, Friesland, Groningen, and Drenthe.

=== Surplus ===
A surge in the manure surplus was anticipated as a result of these measures allowing less organic fertilization to occur. This would affect dairy farmers most severely, as they could previously rely on liquid manure to fertilize their expansive lands. Manure not directly used as organic fertilizer – common in pig and poultry farming – was typically exported or used domestically in biogas plants. To produce biogas, manure is mixed in equal amounts with uncontaminated animal and vegetable remains. An inspection agency found widespread fraud among suppliers of such plants, for example by using waste from illegal drug production, and it concluded in 2016 that subsequent usage of biogas residue as fertilizer was leading to severe health risks. Some plants were shut down, while overall enforcement by the agriculture ministry remained limited.

The yearly Dutch manure surplus amounted to 15–30 kilotonnes (33×10^{6}–66×10^{6} lb) of nitrogen in the years 2021–2022. This was expected to rise to 95 kilotonnes (210×10^{6} lb) of nitrogen in 2026 by the independent Dutch Center for Valorisaton of Manure (NCM), who performed an investigation at the request of Het Financieele Dagblad. Over 80% of that increase was attributed to the expiration of the derogation and the fertilization-free buffer zones. The expansion of nutrient-polluted areas would result in a similar decline in fertilizer usage, but the NCM estimated that three quarters of that decline would concern artificial fertilizer – not impacting the manure surplus. In early 2024, Wageningen University & Research estimated on behalf of the Dutch Dairy Association that the dairy cattle population would decline by 167,000 to 450,000 (10–30% of the total) until 2030. Manure disposal costs had increased to €20–€25 per tonne of manure in 2024, up from €7 in 2021. The NCM's director expected those costs to reach €40–€50. The surplus was aggravated by a wet spring in 2023, lowering the amount of organic fertilizer that could be spread over land.

== Political response ==
=== Fourth Rutte cabinet ===
The cabinet created a €120-million fund to partly compensate the farmers most affected. The Party for Freedom (PVV) received a plurality in the November 2023 general election, and it subsequently led talks to form a right-wing cabinet. In December 2023, the House of Representatives passed a motion by the VVD with widespread support calling on the outgoing cabinet to present an action plan to tackle the crisis before March 2024. Pending the formation of a government, major farmers organizations, with the exception of Farmers Defence Force, had suspended protests triggered by the nitrogen and manure crises. However, following a broader movement across Europe, farmers protested at several locations, and they blocked a number of highways and border crossings to Belgium in early February 2024.

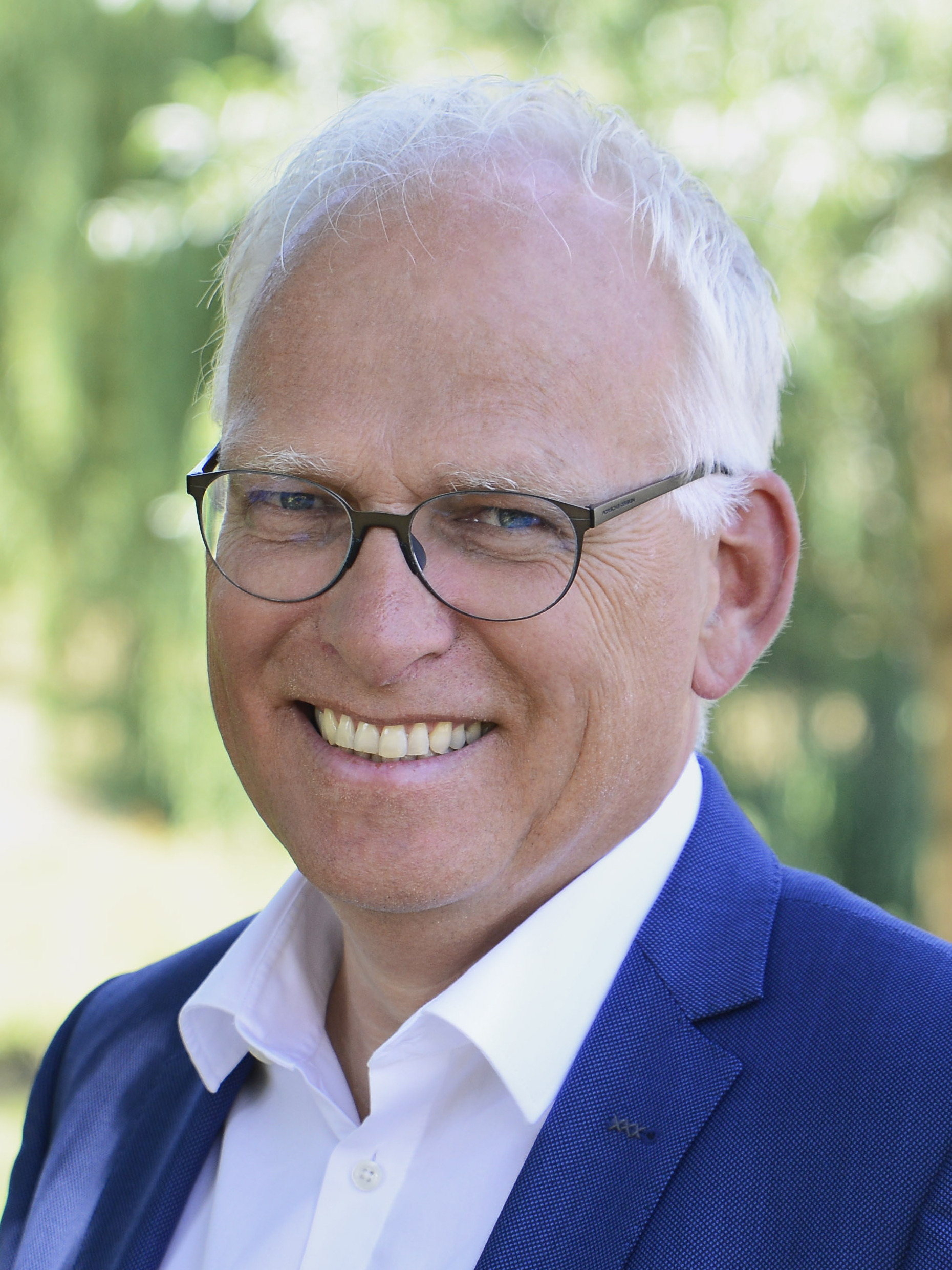
Agriculture minister Piet Adema (2022–2024)

Agriculture minister Piet Adema announced in March 2024 that the European Commission was working on a plan to allow organic fertilizer to be used as a raw material for an artificial fertilizer called "REcovered Nitrogen from manURE" or "renure", which would alleviate the Dutch manure surplus. The Dutch government had lobbied for such an authorization, and a pilot had been conducted in the Netherlands since 2009. Het Financieele Dagblad later reported that no correct overall accounting of inputs and outputs existed and that some sites had been penalized by local governments for violations. Adema failed to get additional concessions from European Commissioner Virginijus Sinkevičius for extensive dairy farmers, previously able to spread all manure over their land.

The four coalition parties – the PVV, VVD, NSC, and BBB – requested Adema to hold off on a buyout scheme for farmers because of the ongoing cabinet formation. Adema responded that urgency was required to prevent farms from going bankrupt and that no easy and painless solutions to the manure crisis existed. Member of parliament Cor Pierik of the Farmer–Citizen Movement (BBB) pressed him to renegotiate with the European Commission, but Adema stated that there was no possibility for extending the Netherlands's legal exemption from the Nitrates Directive. On 5 April 2024, Adema presented his plans, aimed at reducing the livestock population to avert price hikes for manure disposal. The plans included a voluntary buyout scheme for 2025–2029 targeting farmers willing to cease their business and a limit on cattle density of 3 per hectare (1.2/acre) starting in 2032. For every sale of rights to hold farm animals, the government would skim off 30% of the rights. Adema also proposed setting standards to reduce the protein level in cattle feed, thereby lowering the nitrogen content of manure, and raising subsidies for preserving grassland, which retains more nitrogen compared to cropland.

Ahead of a debate in the House of Representatives, four farmers organizations presented an alternative plan that included a compensation scheme for voluntary reductions in the livestock population. In return, they demanded that the European Commission delay the phasing out of the manure derogation. A majority of the House, consisting of the VVD, NSC, GroenLinks–PvdA, D66, CDA, and CU, voiced their support for Adema's plans. The PVV and BBB were in opposition, with Caroline van der Plas (BBB) calling a buyout scheme unacceptable. Van der Plas also opposed the voluntary compensation scheme proposed by the farmers organizations.

=== Schoof cabinet ===
The PVV, VVD, NSC, and BBB presented their coalition agreement on 16 May 2024. It did not include Adema's proposals, and the governing coalition instead planned to renegotiate the phasing out of the manure derogation with the European Commission.

== See also ==
- Nitrogen crisis in the Netherlands
- Great horse manure crisis of 1894
