= List of ministers of agriculture of the Netherlands =

Ministry of Agriculture, Fisheries, Food Security and Nature of the Netherlands
- Minister van Landbouw, Natuur en Voedselkwaliteit
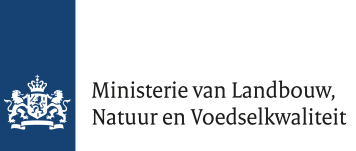
- Ministry of Agriculture, Fisheries, Food Security and Nature

- Flag of the Kingdom of the Netherlands

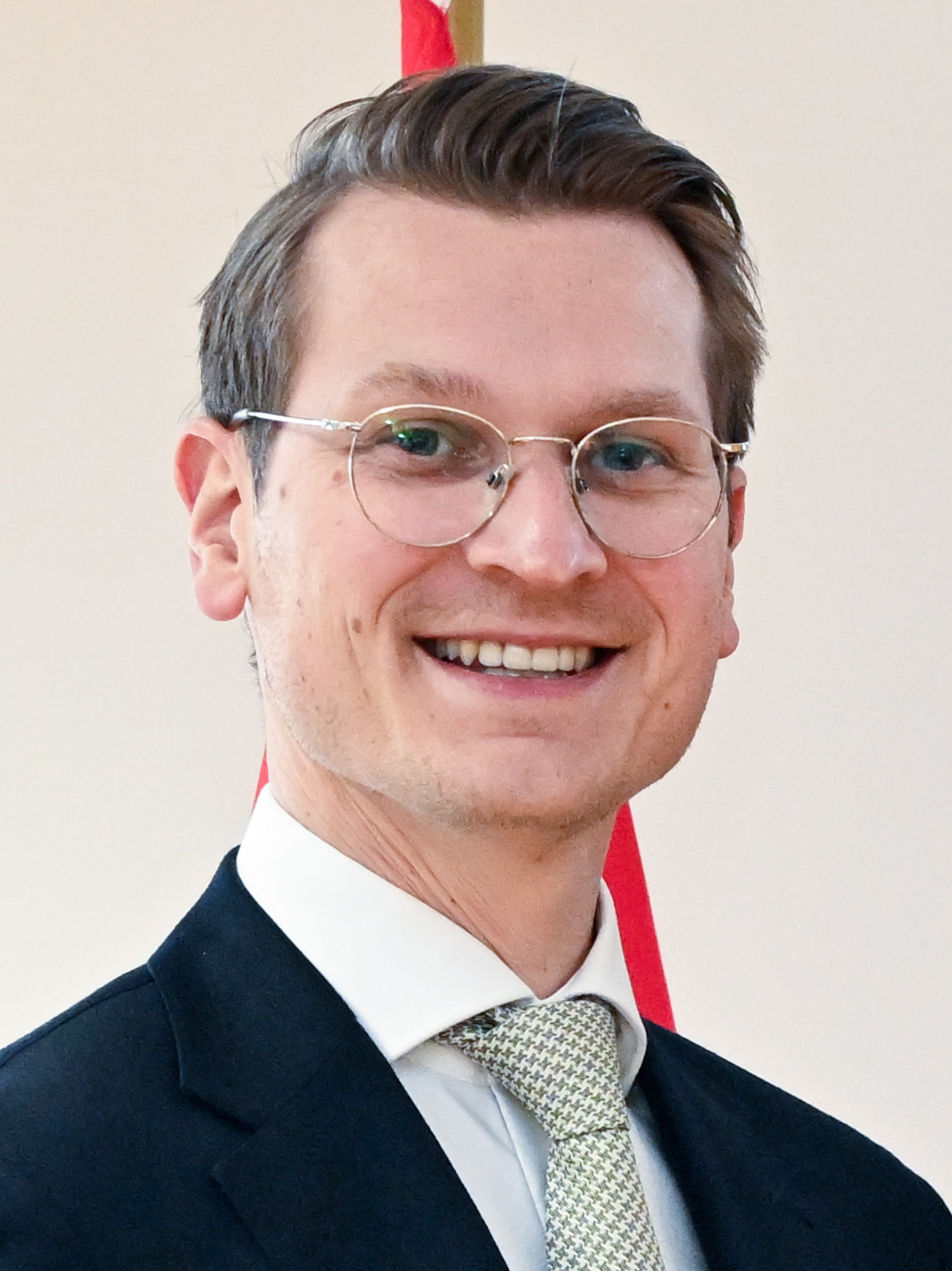
- Incumbent; Jaimi van Essen since 23 February 2026; 7 months ago
- Ministry of Agriculture, Fisheries, Food Security and Nature
- Style: His/Her Excellency
- Member of: Council of Ministers
- Appointer: The monarch; on advice of the prime minister
- First holder: Alexander Gogel as Minister of the Interior; 19 June 1801; 225 years ago Jacob Veegens as Minister of Agriculture, Commerce and Industry; 1 July 1906; 120 years ago
- Deputy: Silvio Erkens as State Secretary for Fisheries, Food Security and Nature
- Salary: €205,991 (As of 2025)

The minister of agriculture, fisheries, food security and nature (Dutch: Minister van Landbouw, Visserij, Voedselzekerheid en Natuur) is the head of the Ministry of Agriculture, Fisheries, Food Security and Nature and a member of the Cabinet and the Council of Ministers. The current minister is Jaimi van Essen of Democrats 66 (D66) who has been in office since 23 February 2026. The current state secretary of Fisheries, Food Security and Nature is Silvio Erkens of the People's Party for Freedom and Democracy (VVD).

== List of ministers ==
=== Agriculture (1906–1940) ===
Minister of Agriculture, Commerce and Industry		Term of office	Party	Prime Minister (Cabinet)
Jacob Veegens	Jacob Veegens (1845–1910)	1 July 1906 – 12 February 1908	Free-thinking; Democratic League	Theo de Meester (De Meester)
Syb Talma	Syb Talma (1864–1916)	12 February 1908 – 29 August 1913	Anti-Revolutionary Party	Theo Heemskerk (T. Heemskerk)
Willem Treub	Willem Treub (also Minister of Finance; 1914) (1858–1931)	29 August 1913 – 19 November 1914^{[Appt]}	Free-thinking; Democratic League	Pieter Cort van der Linden (Cort van der Linden)
Folkert Posthuma	Folkert Posthuma (1874–1943)	19 November 1914 – 9 September 1918	Independent; Liberal (Conservative Liberal)	Pieter Cort van der Linden (Cort van der Linden)
Hendrik van IJsselsteyn	Hendrik van IJsselsteyn (1874–1942)	9 September 1918 – 13 September 1922^{[Res]}	Independent; Christian Democrat (Protestant)	Charles Ruijs de Beerenbrouck (Ruijs de Beerenbrouck I)
Charles Ruijs de Beerenbrouck	Jonkheer; Charles Ruijs de Beerenbrouck (Prime Minister) (1873–1936)	13 September 1922 – 1 January 1923^{[Ad interim]}	Roman Catholic; State Party	Charles Ruijs de Beerenbrouck (Ruijs de Beerenbrouck I)
Charles Ruijs de Beerenbrouck	Jonkheer; Charles Ruijs de Beerenbrouck (Prime Minister) (1873–1936)	13 September 1922 – 1 January 1923^{[Ad interim]}	Roman Catholic; State Party	Charles Ruijs de Beerenbrouck (Ruijs de Beerenbrouck II)
Minister of the Interior and Agriculture		Term of office	Party	Prime Minister (Cabinet)
Charles Ruijs de Beerenbrouck	Jonkheer; Charles Ruijs de Beerenbrouck (Prime Minister) (1869–1944)	1 January 1923 – 4 August 1925	Roman Catholic; State Party	Charles Ruijs de Beerenbrouck (Ruijs de Beerenbrouck II)
Dirk Jan de Geer	Jonkheer; Dirk Jan de Geer (1870–1960)	4 August 1925 – 8 March 1926	Christian Historical Union	Hendrikus Colijn (Colijn I)
Jan Kan	Jan Kan (1873–1947)	8 March 1926 – 10 August 1929	Independent; Liberal (Social Liberal)	Dirk Jan de Geer (De Geer I)
Charles Ruijs de Beerenbrouck	Jonkheer; Charles Ruijs de Beerenbrouck (Prime Minister) (1869–1944)	10 August 1929 – 1 May 1932	Roman Catholic; State Party	Charles Ruijs de Beerenbrouck (Ruijs de Beerenbrouck III)
Minister of Economic Affairs and Labour		Term of office	Party	Prime Minister (Cabinet)
Timotheus Verschuur	Timotheus Verschuur (1886–1945)	1 May 1932 – 8 June 1933	Roman Catholic; State Party	Charles Ruijs de Beerenbrouck (Ruijs de Beerenbrouck III)
Timotheus Verschuur	Timotheus Verschuur (1886–1945)	1 May 1932 – 8 June 1933	Roman Catholic; State Party	Hendrikus Colijn (Colijn II)
Minister of Economic Affairs		Term of office	Party	Prime Minister (Cabinet)
Timotheus Verschuur	Timotheus Verschuur (1886–1945)	8 June 1933 – 17 April 1934^{[Res]}	Roman Catholic; State Party	Hendrikus Colijn (Colijn II)
Hendrikus Colijn	Dr. Hendrikus Colijn (Prime Minister) (1869–1944)	17 April 1934 – 25 June 1934^{[Ad interim]}	Anti-Revolutionary Party	Hendrikus Colijn (Colijn II)
Max Steenberghe	Max Steenberghe (1899–1972)	25 June 1934 – 6 June 1935^{[Res]}	Roman Catholic; State Party	Hendrikus Colijn (Colijn II)
Henri Gelissen	Dr. Henri Gelissen (1895–1982)	6 June 1935 – 2 September 1935	Roman Catholic; State Party	Hendrikus Colijn (Colijn II)
Minister of Agriculture and Fisheries		Term of office	Party	Prime Minister (Cabinet)
Laurentius Nicolaas Deckers	Dr. Laurentius Nicolaas; Deckers (1883–1978)	2 September 1935 – 24 June 1937	Roman Catholic; State Party	Hendrikus Colijn (Colijn III)
Max Steenberghe	Max Steenberghe (also Minister of Economic; Affairs) (1899–1972)	24 June 1937– 25 July 1939	Roman Catholic; State Party	Hendrikus Colijn (Colijn IV)
Minister of Economic Affairs		Term of office	Party	Prime Minister (Cabinet)
Hendrikus Colijn	Dr. Hendrikus Colijn (Prime Minister) (1869–1944)	25 July 1939 – 10 August 1939	Anti-Revolutionary Party	Hendrikus Colijn (Colijn V)
Max Steenberghe	Max Steenberghe (1899–1972)	10 August 1939 – 10 May 1940	Roman Catholic; State Party	Dirk Jan de Geer (De Geer II)

=== Agriculture and fisheries (since 1940) ===
Minister of Agriculture and Fisheries		Term of office	Party	Prime Minister (Cabinet)
Aat van Rhijn	Aat van Rhijn (1892–1986)	10 May 1940 – 1 May 1941^{[App]}	Christian; Historical Union	Dirk Jan de Geer (De Geer II)
Aat van Rhijn	Aat van Rhijn (1892–1986)	10 May 1940 – 1 May 1941^{[App]}	Christian; Historical Union	Pieter Sjoerds; Gerbrandy (Gerbrandy I)
Max Steenberghe	Max Steenberghe (1899–1972)	1 May 1941 – 17 November 1941^{[Res]}	Roman Catholic; State Party	Pieter Sjoerds; Gerbrandy (Gerbrandy I)
Max Steenberghe	Max Steenberghe (1899–1972)	1 May 1941 – 17 November 1941^{[Res]}	Roman Catholic; State Party	Pieter Sjoerds; Gerbrandy (Gerbrandy II)
Jan van den Tempel	Jan van den Tempel (1877–1955)	17 November 1941 – 8 January 1942^{[Ad Interim]} ^{[Minister]}	Social Democratic; Workers' Party	Pieter Sjoerds; Gerbrandy (Gerbrandy II)
Piet Kerstens	Piet Kerstens (1896–1958)	8 January 1942 – 31 May 1944^{[Minister]} ^{[Dis]}	Roman Catholic; State Party	Pieter Sjoerds; Gerbrandy (Gerbrandy II)
Minister of Commerce, Industry and Agriculture		Term of office	Party	Prime Minister (Cabinet)
Johan van den Broek	Johan van den Broek (1882–1946)	31 May 1944 – 23 February 1945^{[Minister]}	Independent; Classical Liberal	Pieter Sjoerds; Gerbrandy (Gerbrandy II)
Hans Gispen	Hans Gispen (1905–1968)	23 February 1945 – 25 June 1945	Anti-Revolutionary; Party	Pieter Sjoerds; Gerbrandy (Gerbrandy III)
Minister of Agriculture, Fisheries and Food Supplies		Term of office	Party	Prime Minister (Cabinet)
Sicco Mansholt	Sicco Mansholt (1908–1995)	25 June 1945 – 1 January 1958^{[App]}	Social Democratic; Workers' Party	Willem; Schermerhorn (Schermerhorn– Drees)
Sicco Mansholt	Sicco Mansholt (1908–1995)	25 June 1945 – 1 January 1958^{[App]}	Labour Party	Louis Beel (Beel I)
Sicco Mansholt	Sicco Mansholt (1908–1995)	25 June 1945 – 1 January 1958^{[App]}	Labour Party	Willem Drees (Drees–Van Schaik • I • II)
Sicco Mansholt	Sicco Mansholt (1908–1995)	25 June 1945 – 1 January 1958^{[App]}	Labour Party	Willem Drees (Drees III)
Kees Staf	Kees Staf (1905–1973)	1 January 1958 – 13 January 1958^{[Ad Interim]} ^{[Minister]}	Christian; Historical Union	Willem Drees (Drees III)
Anne Vondeling	Anne Vondeling (1916–1979)	13 January 1958 – 22 December 1958	Labour Party	Willem Drees (Drees III)
Kees Staf	Kees Staf (1905–1973)	22 December 1958 – 19 May 1959^{[Minister]}	Christian; Historical Union	Louis Beel (Beel II)
Minister of Agriculture and Fisheries		Term of office	Party	Prime Minister (Cabinet)
Victor Marijnen	Victor Marijnen (1917–1975)	19 May 1959 – 24 July 1963	Catholic; People's Party	Jan de Quay (De Quay)
Barend Biesheuvel	Barend; Biesheuvel (1920–2001)^{[Deputy]}	24 July 1963 – 5 April 1967^{[Minister]}	Anti-Revolutionary; Party	Victor Marijnen (Marijnen)
Barend Biesheuvel	Barend; Biesheuvel (1920–2001)^{[Deputy]}	24 July 1963 – 5 April 1967^{[Minister]}	Anti-Revolutionary; Party	Jo Cals (Cals)
Barend Biesheuvel	Barend; Biesheuvel (1920–2001)^{[Deputy]}	24 July 1963 – 5 April 1967^{[Minister]}	Anti-Revolutionary; Party	Jelle Zijlstra (Zijlstra)
Pierre Lardinois	Pierre; Lardinois (1924–1987)	5 April 1967 – 1 January 1973^{[App]}	Catholic; People's Party	Piet de Jong (De Jong)
Pierre Lardinois	Pierre; Lardinois (1924–1987)	5 April 1967 – 1 January 1973^{[App]}	Catholic; People's Party	Barend Biesheuvel (Biesheuvel I)
Pierre Lardinois	Pierre; Lardinois (1924–1987)	5 April 1967 – 1 January 1973^{[App]}	Catholic; People's Party	Barend Biesheuvel (Biesheuvel II)
Jaap Boersma	Jaap Boersma (1929–2012)	1 January 1973 – 11 May 1973^{[Ad Interim]} ^{[Minister]}	Anti-Revolutionary; Party	Barend Biesheuvel (Biesheuvel II)
Tiemen Brouwer	Tiemen Brouwer (1916–1977)	11 May 1973 – 1 November 1973^{[Res]}	Catholic; People's Party	Joop den Uyl (Den Uyl)
Fons van der Stee	Fons van der Stee (1928–1999)	1 November 1973 – 5 March 1980^{[App]}	Catholic; People's Party	Joop den Uyl (Den Uyl)
Fons van der Stee	Fons van der Stee (1928–1999)	1 November 1973 – 5 March 1980^{[App]}	Catholic; People's Party	Dries van Agt (Van Agt I)
Gerrit Braks	Gerrit Braks (1933–2017)	5 March 1980 – 11 September 1981	Catholic; People's Party	Dries van Agt (Van Agt I)
Gerrit Braks	Gerrit Braks (1933–2017)	5 March 1980 – 11 September 1981	Christian; Democratic; Appeal	Dries van Agt (Van Agt I)
Jan de Koning	Jan de Koning (1926–1994)	11 September 1981 – 4 November 1982^{[Minister]}	Christian; Democratic; Appeal	Dries van Agt (Van Agt II • III)
Gerrit Braks	Gerrit Braks (1933–2017)	4 November 1982 – 7 November 1989	Christian; Democratic; Appeal	Ruud Lubbers (Lubbers I • II)
Minister of Agriculture, Nature and Fisheries		Term of office	Party	Prime Minister (Cabinet)
Gerrit Braks	Gerrit Braks (1933–2017)	7 November 1989 – 18 September 1990^{[Res]}	Christian; Democratic; Appeal	Ruud Lubbers (Lubbers III)
Bert de Vries	Bert de Vries (born 1938)	18 September 1990 – 28 September 1990^{[Ad interim]} ^{[Minister]}	Christian; Democratic; Appeal	Ruud Lubbers (Lubbers III)
Piet Bukman	Piet Bukman (1934–2022)	28 September 1990 – 22 August 1994	Christian; Democratic; Appeal	Ruud Lubbers (Lubbers III)
Jozias van Aartsen	Jozias van Aartsen (born 1947)	22 August 1994 – 3 August 1998	People's Party for Freedom and Democracy	Wim Kok (Kok I)
Haijo Apotheker	Hayo Apotheker (born 1950)	3 August 1998 – 7 June 1999^{[Res]}	Democrats 66	Wim Kok (Kok II)
Klaas de Vries	Klaas de Vries (born 1943)	7 June 1999 – 9 June 1999^{[Ad interim]} ^{[Minister]}	Labour Party	Wim Kok (Kok II)
Laurens Jan Brinkhorst	Laurens Jan; Brinkhorst (born 1937)	9 June 1999 – 22 July 2002	Democrats 66	Wim Kok (Kok II)
Cees Veerman	Cees Veerman (born 1949)	22 July 2002 – 1 July 2003	Christian; Democratic; Appeal	Jan Peter; Balkenende (Balkenende I • II)
Minister of Agriculture, Nature and Food Quality		Term of office	Party	Prime Minister (Cabinet)
Cees Veerman	Cees Veerman (born 1949)	1 July 2003 – 22 February 2007	Christian; Democratic; Appeal	Jan Peter; Balkenende (Balkenende II • III)
Gerda Verburg	Gerda Verburg (born 1957)	22 February 2007 – 14 October 2010	Christian; Democratic; Appeal	Jan Peter; Balkenende (Balkenende IV)
Minister of Economic Affairs, Agriculture and Innovation		Term of office	Party	Prime Minister (Cabinet)
Maxime Verhagen	Maxime; Verhagen (born 1956)^{[Deputy]}	14 October 2010 – 5 November 2012	Christian; Democratic; Appeal	Mark Rutte (Rutte I)
Minister of Economic Affairs		Term of office	Party	Prime Minister (Cabinet)
Henk Kamp	Henk Kamp (born 1952)	5 November 2012 – 26 October 2017	People's Party for Freedom and Democracy	Mark Rutte (Rutte II)
Minister of Agriculture, Nature and Food Quality		Term of office	Party	Prime Minister (Cabinet)
Carola Schouten	Carola; Schouten (born 1977)^{[Deputy]}	26 October 2017 – 10 January 2022	Christian Union	Mark Rutte (Rutte III)
Henk Staghouwer	Henk Staghouwer (born 1962)	10 January 2022 – 5 September 2022^{[Res]}	Christian Union	Mark Rutte (Rutte IV)
Carola Schouten	Carola; Schouten (born 1977)^{[Deputy]}	5 September 2022 – 2 October 2022^{[Ad interim]} ^{[Minister]}	Christian Union	Mark Rutte (Rutte IV)
Piet Adema	Piet Adema (born 1964)	2 October 2022 – 2 July 2024	Christian Union	Mark Rutte (Rutte IV)
Minister of Agriculture, Fisheries, Food Security and Nature		Term of office	Party	Prime Minister (Cabinet)
Femke Wiersma	Femke Wiersma (born 1984)	2 July 2024 – 23 February 2026	Farmer–Citizen; Movement	Dick Schoof (Schoof)
	Jaimi van Essen (born 1991)	23 February 2026 – Incumbent	Democrats 66	Rob Jetten (Jetten)

^{Resigned}
^{Ad Interim}
^{Deputy Prime Minister}
^{Minister of Social Affairs}
^{Minister of Commerce, Industry and Shipping}
^{Minister of Finance}
^{Minister of Defence}
^{Minister for Kingdom Relations}
^{Minister of Social Affairs and Employment}
^{Minister for Poverty Policy, Participation and Pensions}
^{Appointed as President of the Court of Audit}
^{Appointed as European Commissioner}
^{Appointed as Minister of Finance}

== List of ministers without portfolio ==
Minister without Portfolio		Portfolio(s)	Term of office	Party	Prime Minister (Cabinet)
Christianne van der Wal	Christianne van der Wal (born 1973)	• Nature Conservation • Nitrogen Policy	10 January 2022 – 2 July 2024	People's Party for Freedom and Democracy	Mark Rutte (Rutte IV)

== List of state secretaries for agriculture ==
State Secretary for Agriculture and Fisheries		Portfolio(s)	Term of office	Party	Prime Minister (Cabinet)
Ad Ploeg	Ad Ploeg (1927–1994)	• Food Policy • Environmental; Policy • Nature • Fisheries • Forestry • Animal Welfare	8 November 1982 – 14 July 1986	People's Party for Freedom and Democracy	Ruud Lubbers (Lubbers I)
State Secretary for Agriculture, Nature and Fisheries		Portfolio(s)	Term of office	Party	Prime Minister (Cabinet)
	Dzsingisz Gabor (born 1940)	• Food Policy • Environmental; Policy • Nature • Fisheries • Forestry • Animal Welfare • Recreation	28 September 1990 – 22 August 1994	Christian; Democratic; Appeal	Ruud Lubbers (Lubbers III)
Geke Faber	Geke Faber (born 1952)	• Food Policy • Nature • Fisheries • Forestry • Animal Welfare	3 August 1998 – 22 July 2002	Labour Party	Wim Kok (Kok II)
	Jan Odink (1944–2018)	• Fisheries • Forestry • Animal Welfare	22 July 2002 – 27 May 2003	Pim Fortuyn List	Jan Peter; Balkenende (Balkenende I)
State Secretary for Economic Affairs, Agriculture and Innovation		Portfolio(s)	Term of office	Party	Prime Minister (Cabinet)
Henk Bleker	Henk Bleker (born 1953)	• Trade and Export • Agriculture • Food Policy • Fisheries • Forestry • Postal Service • Tourism • Animal Welfare^{[Title]}	14 October 2010 – 5 November 2012	Christian; Democratic; Appeal	Mark Rutte (Rutte I)
State Secretary for Economic Affairs		Portfolio(s)	Term of office	Party	Prime Minister (Cabinet)
Co Verdaas	Co Verdaas (born 1966)	• Agriculture • Food Policy • Nature • Fisheries • Forestry • Animal Welfare • Tourism^{[Title]}	5 November 2012 – 6 December 2012^{[Res]}	Labour Party	Mark Rutte (Rutte II)
Sharon Dijksma	Sharon Dijksma (born 1971)	• Agriculture • Food Policy • Nature • Fisheries • Forestry • Animal Welfare • Tourism^{[Title]}	18 December 2012 – 3 November 2015^{[App]}	Labour Party	Mark Rutte (Rutte II)
Martijn van Dam	Martijn van Dam (born 1978)	• Agriculture • Food Policy • Nature • Fisheries • Forestry • Animal Welfare • Tourism^{[Title]}	3 November 2015 – 1 September 2017^{[Res]}	Labour Party	Mark Rutte (Rutte II)
State Secretary for Agriculture, Fisheries, Food Security and Nature		Portfolio(s)	Term of office	Party	Prime Minister (Cabinet)
Jean Rummenie	Jean Rummenie (born 1953)	• Fisheries • Food Security • Nature	2 July 2024 – 23 February 2026	Farmer–Citizen; Movement	Dick Schoof (Schoof)
Silvio Erkens	Silvio Erkens (born 1990)	• Fisheries • Food Security • Nature	23 February 2026 – Incumbent	People's Party for Freedom and Democracy	Rob Jetten (Jetten)

^{Resigned}
^{Designated with the diplomatic rank of Minister}
^{Appointed as State Secretary for Infrastructure and the Environment}

== See also ==
- Ministry of Agriculture, Fisheries, Food Security and Nature
- Flower bulb cultivation in the Netherlands
- 1963 Dutch farmers' revolt
- 1971 Dutch farmers' revolt
- 1989–1990 Dutch farmers' protests
- Dutch farmers' protests
- Netherlands Food and Consumer Product Safety Authority
