= FIOD =

Dutch government agency

- Logo of the Dutch Government.
- Common name: FIOD

Agency overview
- Formed: 1945
- Preceding agency: FIOD-ECD
- Employees: 1,750

Jurisdictional structure
- National agency (Operations jurisdiction): Netherlands
- Operations jurisdiction: Netherlands
- Population: 17 million
- Legal jurisdiction: As per operations jurisdiction

Operational structure
- Overseen by Ministry: Ministry of Finance
- Headquarters: Utrecht, Netherlands
- Elected officer responsible: Eelco Heinen, Minister of Finance
- Agency executive: Niels Obbink, Director
- Parent agency: Tax and Customs Administration
- Teams: 6-9: Observation Teams; Technical Investigation Team; Digital Investigations; Strategic Investigations; International Investigations; Piracy Investigation Team (TOP)

Notables
- Programme: Rekeningenproject

Website
- https://www.fiod.nl

The FIOD is an agency of the government of the Netherlands responsible for investigating financial crimes. It is part of the Tax and Customs Administration, which itself falls under the responsibility of the Dutch Ministry of Finance.

== History ==
The FIOD-ECD was formed when the Fiscal Intelligence and Investigation Service (Dutch: Fiscale inlichtingen- en opsporingsdienst, FIOD) and the ECD (Dutch: Economische Controledienst) were merged in 1999. In 2010, the name was changed to FIOD.

== Role ==
The FIOD's main roles are in investigation and governance. Investigations are mainly carried out into economic, fiscal and financial fraud. Governance is carried out in economic and financial areas.

Any one of the five main Dutch ministries (Economics, Finance, Foreign Affairs, Justice, and Health, Welfare and Sports) can order the FIOD to act on information of suspected fraud. They are also the investigation unit for several financial watchdogs.

== Piracy ==
One of the investigative teams is the Team Opsporing Piraterij (Piracy Investigations Team) which specifically investigates breaches of the Copyright Act of 1912.

It has cooperated with BREIN to investigate p2p sites hosted in the Netherlands.
