= Henk Staghouwer =

Dutch politician (born 1962)

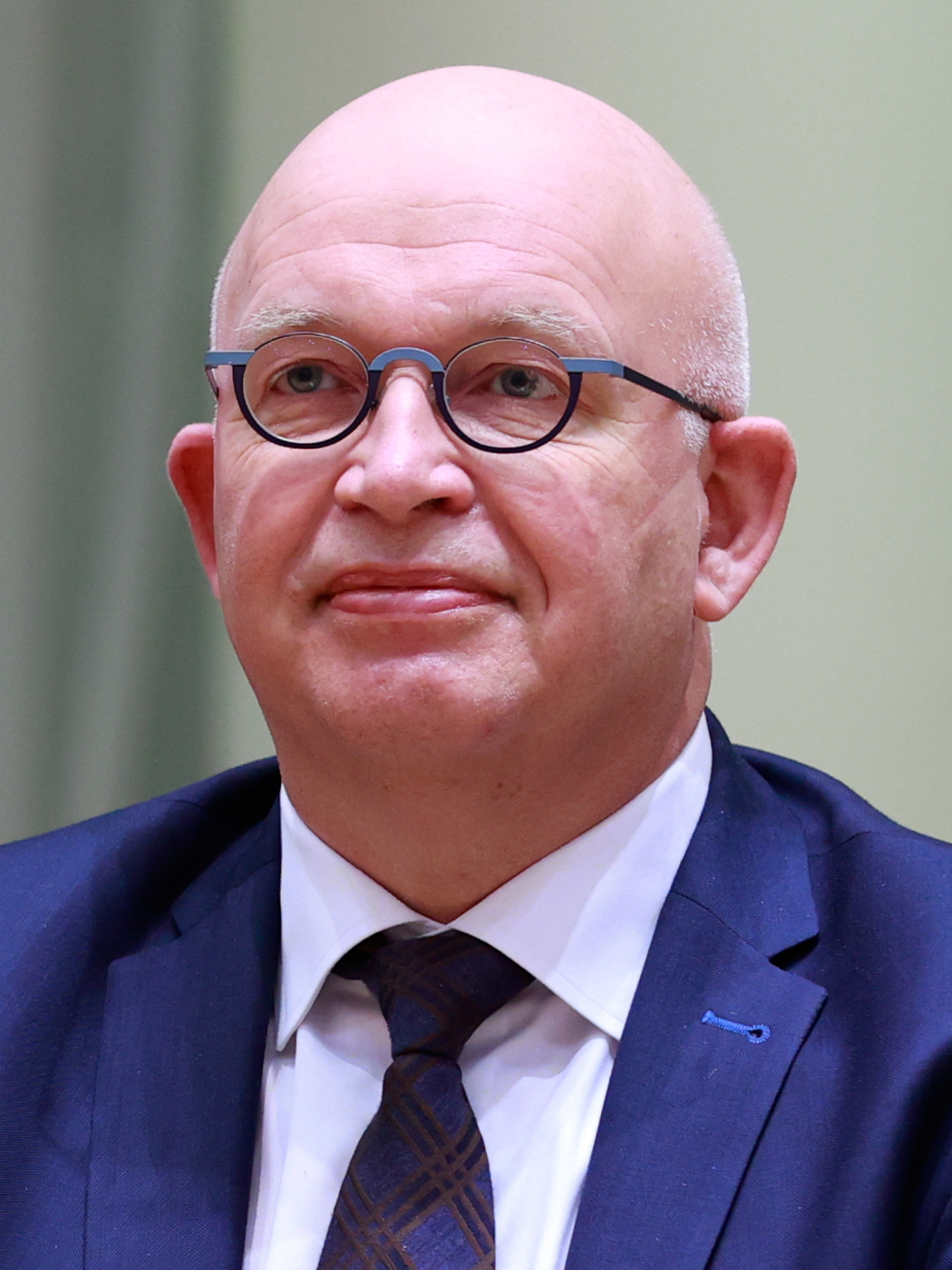
- Staghouwer in 2022

Minister of Agriculture, Nature and Food Quality
- In office 10 January 2022 – 5 September 2022
- Preceded by: Carola Schouten
- Succeeded by: Piet Adema

Provincial executive of Groningen
- In office 24 April 2013 – 10 January 2022

Group leader of the Christian Union in the Provincial Council of Groningen
- In office 2007–2013

Member of the Provincial Council of Groningen
- In office 2002–2013

Personal details
- Born: 14 February 1962 (age 64) Hoogkerk, Netherlands
- Party: Christian Union

Henk Staghouwer (born 14 February 1962) is a Dutch administrator and Christian Union politician. He served as Minister of Agriculture, Nature and Food Quality in the fourth Rutte cabinet from 10 January to 5 September 2022. From 24 April 2013 to 10 January 2022 he was a member of the provincial executive of Groningen.

== Education and career ==
Staghouwer went to middle school from 1974 to 1978, and from 1978 to 1982 he followed a vocational training course at the present Noorderpoort in Groningen, and from 1981 to 1982, he followed an entrepreneurial course at the present Piter Jelles in Leeuwarden. From 1978 to 1989, he worked at a bakery in Zuidhorn, and from 1989 to 2012, he was director and owner of bakery chain Staghouwer.

Until 2013, Staghouwer also held various additional positions, such as board member of the Company Pension Fund for the Bakery, Kredietunie Nederland, and the Kredietunie voor de Bakkerij. Until April 2015, he was a part-time deputy, and he was also treasurer of the Dutch Bread and Pastry Bakers Association NBOV, and advisor to the PUM, Program Broadcast Managers.

== Political career ==
Staghouwer was a member of the Provincial Council of Groningen from 2002 to 2013, becoming the Christian Union's group leader in 2007. From 2013, he was deputy of Groningen, succeeding Wiebe van der Ploeg. His portfolio included topsoil (damage, reinforcement, governance), agriculture and fisheries, nature and landscape, Wadden and Wadden Fund, internationalization and area North Groningen (Het Hogeland, Eemsdelta). Since the departure of Deputy Nienke Homan on 1 December 2021 he also had climate adaptation and water in his portfolio.

In November 2021, Deputy Staghouwer came under fire because of a letter he sent on his own initiative in June to outgoing Minister of Economic Affairs Stef Blok as chairman of the Groningen Reinforcement Consultation (VOG). This was a letter of support not to implement the amendments of Socialist lawmaker Sandra Beckerman. These amendments adopted by the House of Representatives (changes to a bill) were intended to support Groningen residents who are dealing with the consequences of gas extraction by means of legal assistance, and to offer them the opportunity to take control of the reinforcement process themselves.

Minister Blok wanted to ignore this amendment to the law because members of parliament Paul van Meenen (D66) and Agnes Mulder (CDA) accidentally voted for one of the two proposals on behalf of their group, resulting in a majority in the House. At the request of outgoing Minister Blok of Economic Affairs, Staghouwer sent this letter of support on behalf of the Groningen Reinforcement Consultation (VOG), without consulting other Groningen administrators.

Staghouwer was appointed Minister of Agriculture, Nature and Food Quality in the fourth Rutte cabinet on 10 January 2022, succeeding party colleague Carola Schouten. As a minister, his portfolio includes agriculture, horticulture, fisheries, food quality, animal welfare and animal health (DGF), plant breeders' rights, and the Dutch Food and Consumer Product Safety Authority. He resigned on 5 September 2022, citing insufficient parliamentary confidence. Carola Schouten, now also minister for Poverty Policy, Participation and Pensions, returned as acting agriculture minister. On 3 October former Christian Union party chairman Piet Adema took office as minister of Agriculture, Nature and Food Quality.

Staghouwer became chair of Food Banks Netherlands in January 2023.

== Private life ==
Staghouwer is married and has three children.
