= Great horse manure crisis of 1894 =

Historical notion in urban planning

The great horse manure crisis of 1894 is an urban myth that a significant obstacle to urban development at the turn of the 20th century was the difficulty of removing horse manure from the streets of major Western cities. The phrase originates from a 2004 article by Stephen Davies entitled "The Great Horse-Manure Crisis of 1894" which stated that "Writing in the Times of London in 1894, one writer estimated that in 50 years every street in London would be buried under nine feet of manure.". However, no such article has been located and the newspaper refuted the attribution in 2018.

More broadly, it is an analogy for supposedly insuperable extrapolated problems being rendered moot by the introduction of new technologies.

== Details ==
The supposed problem of excessive horse-manure collecting in the streets was solved by the proliferation of cars, buses and electrified trams which replaced horses as the means of transportation in big cities. The term great horse manure crisis of 1894 is often used to denote a problem which seems to be impossible to solve because it is being looked at from the wrong direction.

The name refers to a supposed 1894 publication in The Times, which said "In 50 years, every street in London will be buried under nine feet of manure". However, this citation was refuted by The Times in 2018 as erroneous. An article published on June 8, 1894 complained about dust and mud (rather than manure), but did not predict a crisis. The reasoning was that more horses are needed to remove the manure, and these horses produce more manure. An urban planning conference in 1898 supposedly broke up before its scheduled end due to a failure to find an answer to this problem. No such statement in the Times, nor conference result, is known, but in 1893 London there was a complaint that horse manure, formerly an economic good that could be sold, had become a disposal problem, an economic bad.

In 1896, in Italy, the Corriere della Sera underlined how the proliferation of cars would revolutionize habits, resulting, among other things, in the disappearance of manure from the streets.

The supposed crisis has since taken on life as a useful analogy.

== See also ==
- Manure crisis in the Netherlands
