= Carola Schouten =

Dutch politician (born 1977)

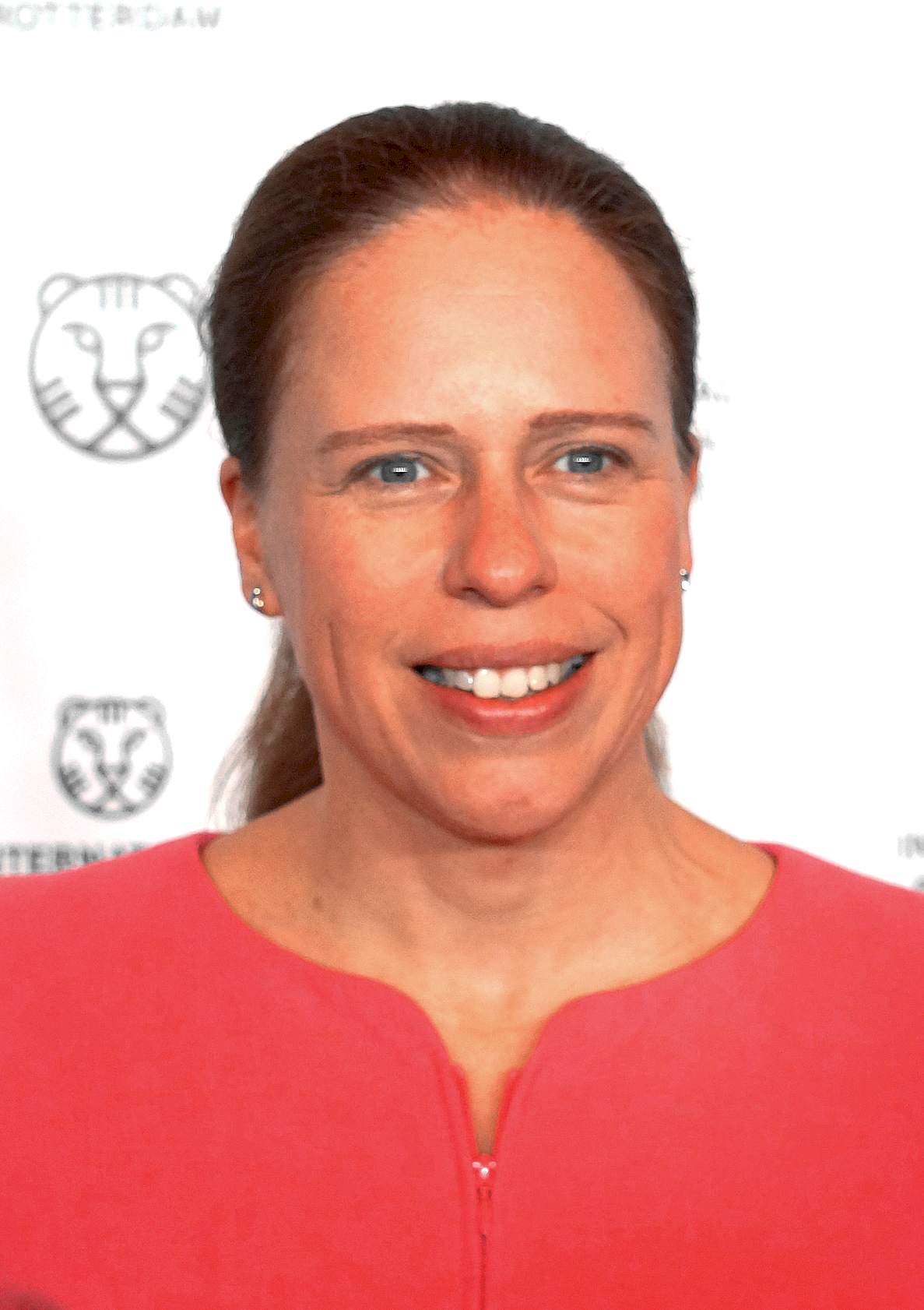
- Schouten in 2017

Mayor of Rotterdam
- Incumbent
- Assumed office 10 October 2024
- Preceded by: Ahmed Aboutaleb

Third Deputy Prime Minister of the Netherlands
- In office 26 October 2017 – 2 July 2024
- Prime Minister: Mark Rutte
- Preceded by: Lodewijk Asscher (Deputy PM)
- Succeeded by: Eddy van Hijum

Minister for Poverty Policy, Participation and Pensions
- In office 10 January 2022 – 2 July 2024
- Prime Minister: Mark Rutte
- Preceded by: Dennis Wiersma
- Succeeded by: Jurgen Nobel

Minister of Agriculture, Nature and Food Quality
- In office 26 October 2017 – 10 January 2022
- Prime Minister: Mark Rutte
- Preceded by: Henk Kamp (as Minister of Economic Affairs)
- Succeeded by: Henk Staghouwer

Member of the House of Representatives
- In office 31 March 2021 – 18 January 2022
- Succeeded by: Stieneke van der Graaf
- In office 18 May 2011 – 26 October 2017
- Preceded by: André Rouvoet
- Succeeded by: Stieneke van der Graaf

Personal details
- Born: Cornelia Johanna Schouten; 6 October 1977 (age 48) 's-Hertogenbosch, Netherlands
- Party: Christian Union
- Children: 1
- Education: Erasmus University Rotterdam (Bachelor of Business Administration, Master of Business Administration)
- Occupation: Politician · Civil servant
- Website: Minister of Agriculture, Nature and Food Quality

Cornelia Johanna "Carola" Schouten (Dutch: [kaːˈroːlaː ˈsxʌutə(n)]; born 6 October 1977) is a Dutch politician of the Christian Union (CU). She was Minister of Agriculture, Nature and Food Quality and Third Deputy Prime Minister in the third Rutte cabinet from 2017 to 2022. She continued to serve as Third Deputy Prime Minister in the fourth Rutte cabinet alongside her position as Minister for Poverty Policy, Participation and Pensions until July 2024. On 10 October 2024, Schouten became the mayor of Rotterdam succeeding Ahmed Aboutaleb.

== Early life and education ==
A native of 's-Hertogenbosch, Schouten grew up in Waardhuizen, managing her deceased father's dairy farm with her mother and her two sisters for four years, after which time the family ended the farming activities and moved to neighbouring village of Giessen (Waardhuizen and Giessen are nowadays located in the new municipality of Altena).

She attended Altena College in Sleeuwijk and studied business administration at Erasmus University Rotterdam with a year abroad at Tel Aviv University. Schouten worked at the Ministry of Social Affairs and Employment from 2000 to 2006. Subsequently, she was an assistant to the Christian Union parliamentary group, entering into politics.

== Political career ==
Schouten became a member of the House of Representatives in 2011 upon the resignation of former Deputy Prime Minister André Rouvoet. In parliament, she served as her group's spokesperson on financial policy.

Schouten and party leader Gert-Jan Segers participated in the negotiations of forming the third Rutte cabinet, which she entered as Deputy Prime Minister. From autumn 2019 she faced farmers' protests because of government's measures involving decreasing the number of livestock. In 2020, Schouten suggested the EU should begin to adjust animal welfare regulations and limit live animal exports. From 2021, she led efforts on legislation on reducing damaging ammonia pollution.

In 2022, she introduced the Future Pensions Act into law.

In July 2024, Schouten was nominated to become the mayor of Rotterdam, succeeding Ahmed Aboutaleb. She was sworn in on 10 October 2024.

== Personal life ==
Schouten married Coert Kleijwegt on 27 June 2026. She has a son from a previous relationship. She is a member of the Dutch Reformed Churches (previously the Reformed Churches in the Netherlands (Liberated)). She lives in Rotterdam. Her younger sister Marjan van der Meij-Schouten is a member of the municipal council of Altena, like her older sister on behalf of the Christian Union.

== Honours ==
- Estonia: Member 1st Class of the Order of the Cross of Terra Mariana (5 June 2018)

== See also ==
- Dutch farmers' protests

Political offices
| Preceded by Lodewijk Asscher | Deputy Prime Minister; 2017–2024 | Succeeded by Eddy van Hijum |
| Preceded by Henk Kamp as Minister of Economic Affairs | Minister of Agriculture, Nature and Food Quality; 2017–2022 | Succeeded by Henk Staghouwer |
| Preceded by Dennis Wiersma as State Secretary for Social Affairs and Employment | Minister for Poverty Policy, Participation and Pensions; 2022–2024 | Succeeded by Jurgen Nobel as State Secretary for Participation and Integration |
| Preceded by Ahmed Aboutaleb | Mayor of Rotterdam; 2024–present | Incumbent |
