= Piet Adema =

Dutch politician (born 1964)

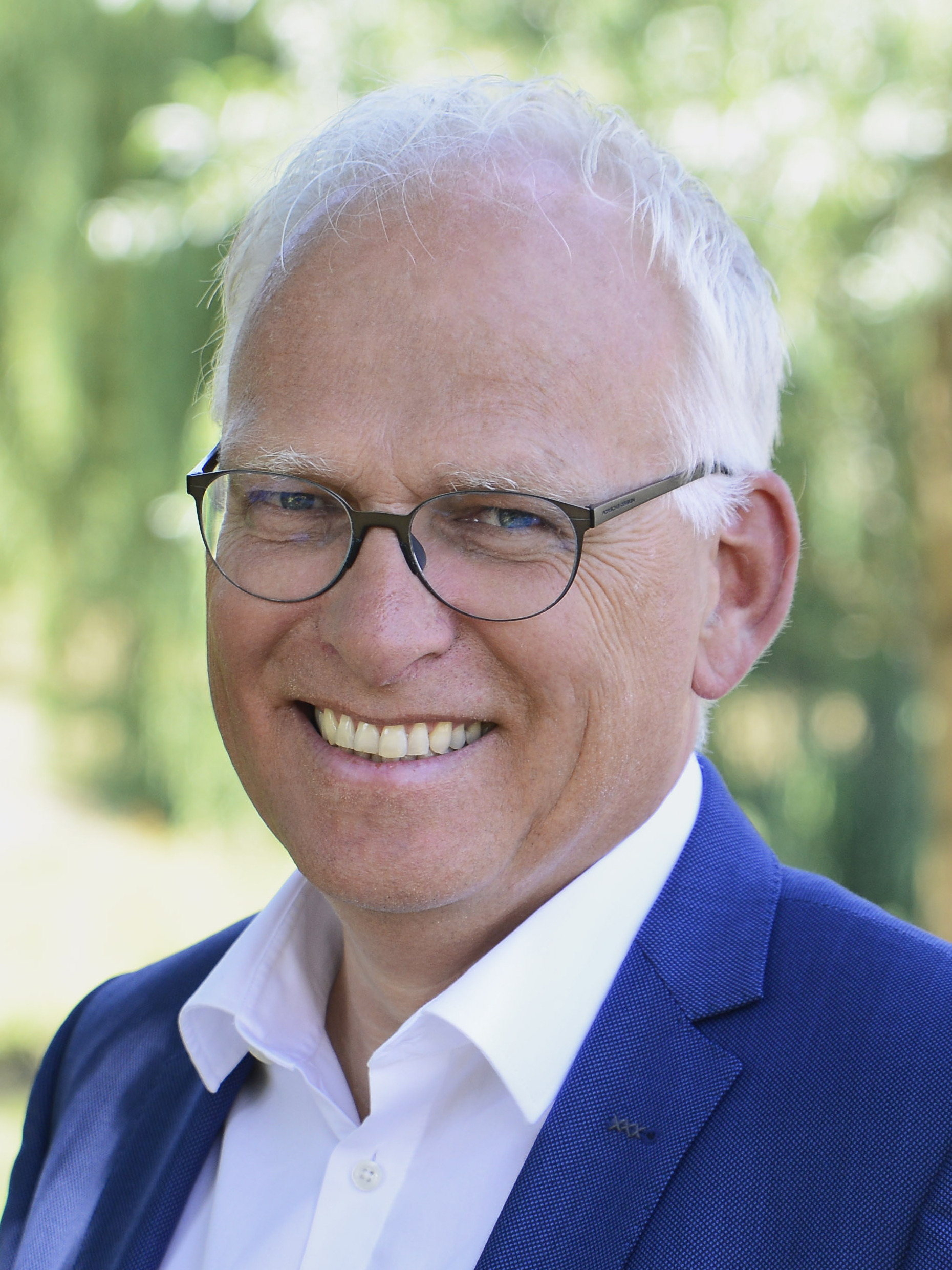
- Adema in 2018

Minister of Agriculture, Nature and Food Quality
- In office 3 October 2022 – 2 July 2024
- Prime Minister: Mark Rutte
- Preceded by: Henk Staghouwer
- Succeeded by: Femke Wiersma

Chairman of the Christian Union
- In office 13 April 2013 – 17 April 2021
- Preceded by: Klaas Tigelaar
- Succeeded by: Ankie van Tatenhove

Personal details
- Born: Pieter Adema; 6 November 1964 (age 61) Opeinde, Friesland, Netherlands
- Party: Christian Union
- Occupation: politician civil servant

Pieter "Piet" Adema (born 6 November 1964) is a Dutch politician. From 3 October 2022 to 2 July 2024, he served as the minister of agriculture, nature and food quality on behalf of the Christian Union (CU) in the fourth Rutte cabinet.

== Tenure ==
Following the collapse of the fourth Rutte cabinet in July 2023, Adema continued serving as demissionary minister. He sent a plan to the House of Representatives in April 2024 to tackle the Dutch manure crisis, a manure surplus that would likely result from the Netherlands losing its exemption in 2026 from a limit in the European Union's (EU) Nitrates Directive on the fertilization of farmland with manure. Adema's proposal included a buyout program and would lead to a decrease in the livestock population. The PVV, VVD, NSC, and BBB – representing a majority in the House – called on the minister to hold off the plans due to the ongoing cabinet formation.

Adema is known for his push for animal welfare, an example of this can be seen in his work on a ban on owning animals with harmful external characteristics, such as a cat with folded ears or a dog with a short snout. Additionally, in 2024, Adema started working on a ban on "puppy yoga".

His term as minister ended on 2 July 2024, when the Schoof cabinet was sworn in.

== Electoral history ==
Electoral history of Piet Adema
Year	Body	Party	Pos.	Votes	Result		Ref.
Year	Body	Party	Pos.	Votes	Party seats	Individual	Ref.
2010	House of Representatives	Christian Union	24	533	5	Lost	
2012	House of Representatives	Christian Union	24	502	5	Lost	
2023	House of Representatives	Christian Union	45 (Note: Adema participated as a lijstduwer.)	224	3	Lost	
