= Environmental Protection Agency (Netherlands) =

Dutch government agency

Logo of the DCMR Environmental Protection Agency, the largest Environmental Protection Agency in the Netherlands.

The Dutch Environmental Protection Agencies (Dutch: Omgevingsdiensten) are government agencies in the Netherlands responsible for permits, surveillance, and law enforcement in the natural environment. There are 28 regional environmental protection agencies, and they work on behalf of municipal and provincial governments. They enforce the Environment and Planning Act in the regions in which they are active, and the six largest agencies also enforce the European Seveso III-directive.
