= Emmikhoven =

Village in the Netherlands

Coordinates: 51°47′N 4°59′E

Emmikhoven is a former village in the Dutch province of North Brabant. It was located just south of Almkerk, on the other side of the small river Alm, and is now a part of that village.

Emmikhoven and nearby Waardhuizen formed a separate municipality until 1879, under the name Emmikhoven en Waardhuizen or Emmikhoven c.a., when it was merged with Almkerk.
