= Environment and Planning Act =

Dutch statute passed in 2016

States General of the Netherlands
- Long title: Rules on the protection and utilization of the physical environment
- Citation: Staatsblad 2016, 156
- Passed by: House of Representatives
- Passed: 1 July 2015
- Passed by: Senate
- Passed: 22 March 2016
- Signed by: King Willem-Alexander; Melanie Maas Geesteranus; Martijn van Dam; Ronald Plasterk; Stef Blok; Ard van der Steur; Jet Bussemaker
- Signed: 23 March 2016
- Effective: 1 January 2024
- Status: In force

The Environment and Planning Act (Dutch: Omgevingswet) is a statute governing spatial planning in the Netherlands. It replaces existing legislation and was signed into law on 23 March 2016. It came into force in 2024 after several postponements resulting from concerns surrounding the law's implementation.

== Contents ==
The Environment and Planning Act largely consolidated 26 existing laws and dozens of regulations concerning spatial planning and the environment. These included the Spatial Planning Act, the Route Act, the Odor Nuisance and Livestock Farming Act, and the Crisis and Recovery Act. The new statute moved the application procedure for building permits at provinces and municipalities to a single centralized online system, which would show all relevant regulations. Governments are required to respond to applications within eight weeks.

== Legislative history and implementation ==
The conception of the Environment and Planning Act was agreed upon in October 2012 in the coalition agreement of the second Rutte cabinet. King Willem-Alexander mentioned it in his annual speech on Prinsjesdag the following year, and it was introduced in the House of Representatives on 16 June 2014 by the cabinet. All parliamentary groups except GroenLinks and the Party for the Animals voted in favor on 1 July 2015, leading the bill to pass with 144 out of 150 votes. The legislation subsequently moved to the Senate, where it was adopted on 22 March 2016 with the same two parties in opposition. King Willem-Alexander and six relevant ministers signed the bill into law the day after.

The implementation of the Environment and Planning Act, initially set for 2017, was postponed multiple times by the government. This was the result of concerns about the new digital system for building permits, to which individual municipalities and provinces would have to connect their software. Warnings originated from the Council of State, local and regional government officials, and software providers. Interoperability issues between information systems were common, and the NRC reported that the €2 billion spent on the system's national database had made it one of the most costly IT projects of the Dutch government so far. The Advisory Council on IT Assessment concluded in late 2022 that it had insufficient clarity on the system's quality and was expecting mistakes.

In October 2023, a motion by GroenLinks-PvdA was supported by a Senate majority declaring that issues with the digital system were still too great to responsibly move forward with the law's implementation in 2024. Minister for Housing and Spatial Planning Hugo de Jonge decided to disregard the motion, saying that he had been assured enough issues had been resolved. However, he did appoint a special commissioner to intervene if necessary. The Environment and Planning Act finally went into effect on 1 January 2024. ANP reported at the end of 2023 that many municipalities were not yet prepared for the new digital system. They were allowed to keep using their old software in a ten-year transition period, but they would have to transfer all new permits to the new system eventually.
