= Ministry of Agriculture, Fisheries, Food Security and Nature =

Government ministry of the Netherlands

- Dutch: Ministerie van Landbouw, Visserij, Voedselzekerheid en Natuur
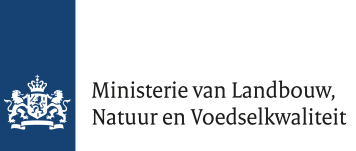
- Former logo of the ministry

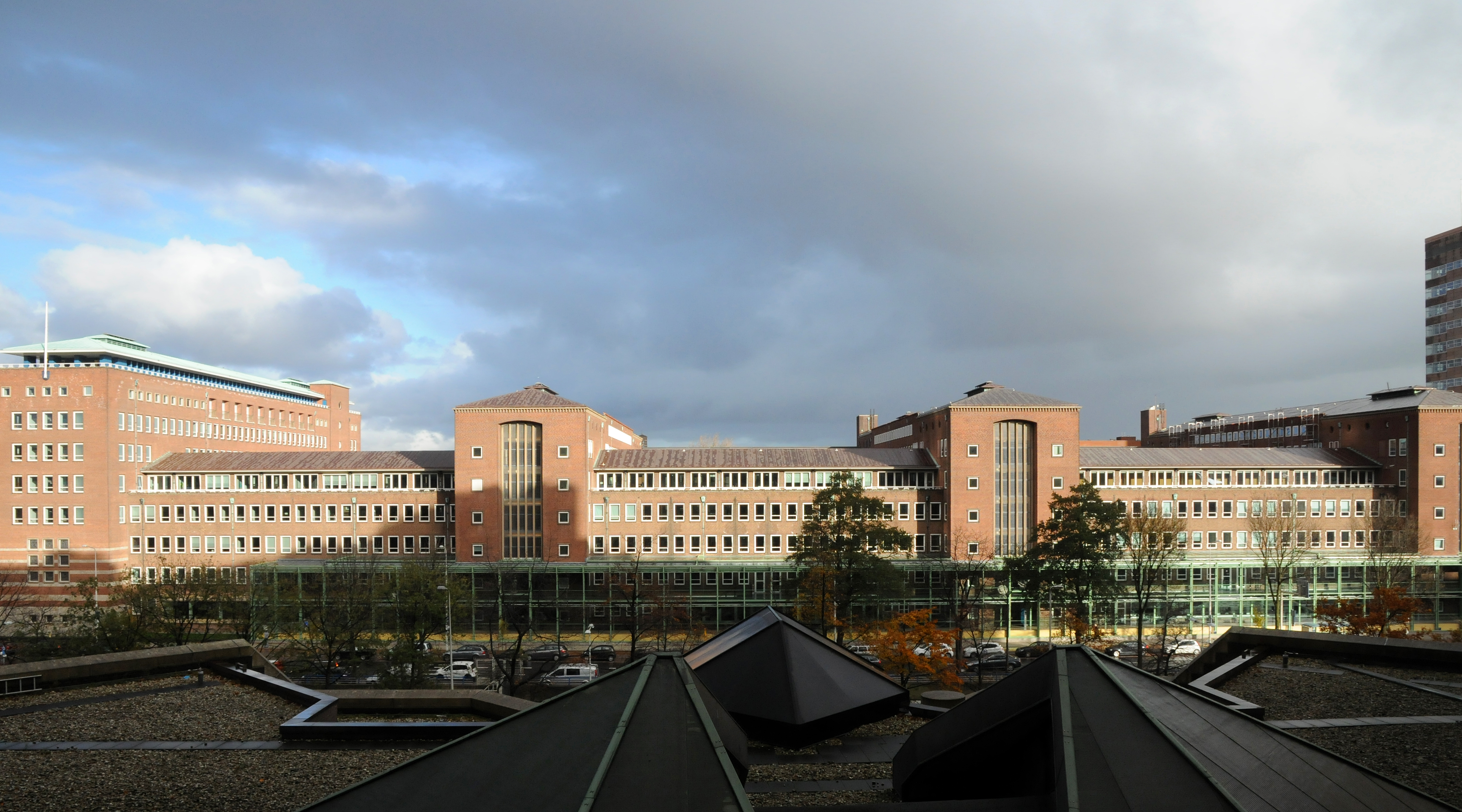
- Building of the Ministry of Agriculture, Fisheries, Food Security and Nature

Department overview
- Formed: 2 September 1935; 91 years ago
- Jurisdiction: Kingdom of the Netherlands
- Headquarters: Bezuidenhoutseweg 73, The Hague, Netherlands
- Employees: 1,000
- Minister responsible: Jaimi van Essen, Minister of Agriculture, Fisheries, Food Security and Nature
- Deputy Minister responsible: Silvio Erkens, State Secretary for Fisheries, Food Security and Nature
- Department executive: Jan-Kees Goet, Secretary-General
- Website: Ministry of Agriculture, Fisheries, Food Security and Nature

The Ministry of Agriculture, Fisheries, Food Security and Nature (Dutch: Ministerie van Landbouw, Visserij, Voedselzekerheid en Natuur; LVVN) is the Dutch Ministry responsible for agricultural policy, food policy, food safety, fisheries, forestry, natural conservation and animal welfare. The Ministry was created in 1935 and in 2010 the department was merged with the Ministry of Economic Affairs and was named the Ministry of Economic Affairs, Agriculture and Innovation. The Ministry was reinstated in 2017 as the Ministry of Agriculture, Nature and Food Quality, and renamed in 2024 to its current name. It is headed by the Minister of Agriculture, Fisheries, Food Security and Nature (Dutch: Minister van Landbouw, Visserij, Voedselzekerheid en Natuur), a member of the Cabinet of the Netherlands. This post is currently occupied by Jaimi van Essen of Democrats 66. Despite its small size, the Netherlands is the world's second exporter of agricultural products, after the United States.

== Responsibilities ==
The Ministry was responsible for four fields of policy:

- Agriculture and fisheries;
- Natural conservation, open air recreation and national parks;
- Food Safety;
- Rural development.

== History ==
The Ministry was established as a separate ministry, called "Ministry of Agriculture and Fisheries", in 1935. Agriculture and fisheries policy had previously been integrated into the Ministry of the Interior and Kingdom Relations and later into the Ministry of Water, Trade and Industry.

After the Second World War the Ministry became responsible for the rationing of food and the reconstruction of the agricultural sector. As such it became much more important. Between 1946 and 1982 the ministry was a "client"-oriented ministry, oriented at the development of the agriculture sector in accordance to the European Common Agricultural Policy. In 1982 the ministry also became responsible for natural conservation and open air recreation, which used to be part of the responsibilities of the Ministry of Culture, Recreation and Social Work. As such it became more focused on sustainable development of the agricultural sector.

In 2003 the Food and Goods Authority became part of the ministry, which was renamed Ministry of Agriculture, Nature and Food Quality. A new governing coalition agreed in May 2024 to change its name to the Ministry of Agriculture, Fisheries, Food Security and Nature.

== Organisation ==
The Ministry has currently one government agency and one directorate:

Government Agencies			Responsibilities
Ministry of General Affairs	Netherlands Food and Consumer Product Safety Authority (Dutch: Nederlandse Voedsel- en Warenautoriteit)	NVWA	Consumer protection • Food safety • Goods • Tobacco • Animal welfare • Veterinary medicine • Habitat conservation • Outdoor recreation

- Directorate for Agriculture and Nature Policy

== See also ==
- List of ministers of agriculture of the Netherlands
- Food administration
