= Kernfysische Dienst =

Dutch nuclear regulatory organisation

The Kernfysische dienst (Department of Nuclear Safety, Security and Safeguards) was the Dutch nuclear regulatory organisation. It was a part of the ministry of Ministry of Economic Affairs (Netherlands).

It was the legal supervisor of the nuclear reactors in Borssele, Petten, Dodewaard and Delft, as well as other installations dealing with civil radioactive substances.

In fact it was for the IAEA an issue of concern that the nuclear regulator is part of the same governmental agency which is also in charge of stimulating nuclear power.

As of January 1, 2015, the service was taken over by the Authority for Nuclear Safety and Radiation Protection (ANVS).
