= Femke Wiersma =

Dutch politician (born 1984)

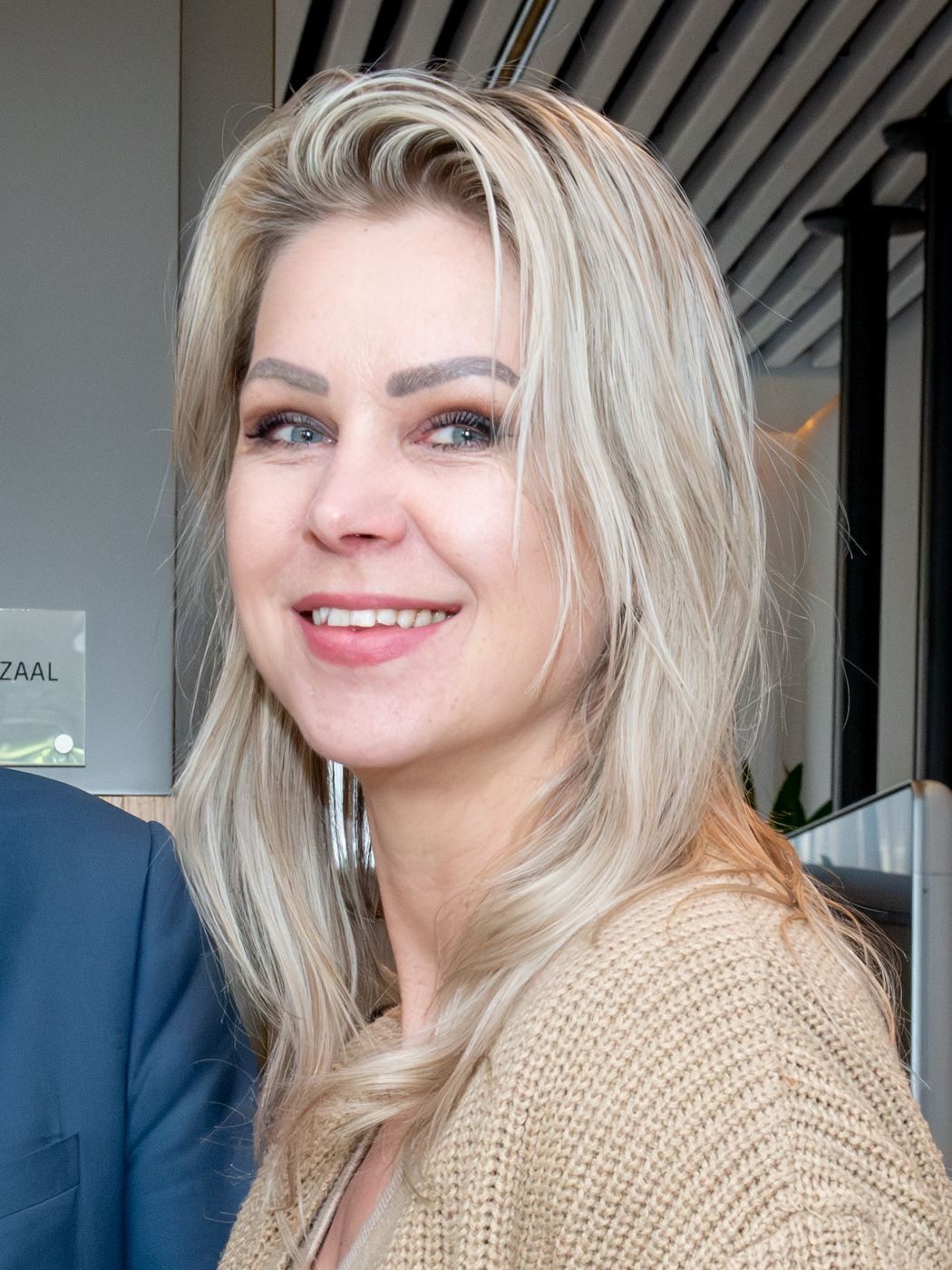
- Wiersma in 2025

Minister of Agriculture, Fisheries, Food Security and Nature
- In office 2 July 2024 – 22 February 2026
- Prime Minister: Dick Schoof
- Preceded by: Piet Adema

Member of the House of Representatives
- Incumbent
- Assumed office 12 November 2025

Member of the Provincial Executive of Friesland
- In office 19 July 2023 – 2 July 2024

Personal details
- Born: Femke Marije Wiersma; 29 December 1984 (age 41) Dokkum, Netherlands
- Party: BBB (2019–present)
- Spouse: Gijsbert Bakhuisen (m. 2016; div. 2019)
- Children: 4
- Occupation: Politician; lobbyist; civil servant

Military service
- Allegiance: Netherlands
- Branch/service: Royal Netherlands Navy
- Years of service: 2002–2006
- Rank: Sailor

Femke Marije Wiersma (born 29 December 1984) is a Dutch agricultural lobbyist and politician of the Farmer–Citizen Movement (BBB). She is a member of the House of Representatives since November 2025. She served as Minister of Agriculture, Fisheries, Food Security and Nature in the Schoof cabinet between July 2024 and February 2026. Previously, she was a member of the Provincial Executive of Friesland.

== Early life and career ==
Wiersma was born in 1984 in Dokkum, located in Friesland. After her parents divorced a year later, she was raised by her mother, who was struggling with poverty. Wiersma took care of horses in her childhood, and she attended secondary education at mavo and at havo/vwo levels in Dokkum. Wiersma joined the Royal Netherlands Navy in 2002, serving as a sailor on the HNLMS Jacob van Heemskerck in locations such as the Mediterranean Sea. She was subsequently stationed at a Texel navy base before leaving the military in 2006. She completed training in social work in 2007, and she joined the Dantumadiel and Dongeradeel municipalities the following year as a care consultant, assessing the eligibility of citizens for municipal support programs.

After moving to Abcoude for a relationship with a farmer, she established a tea garden, and she started writing opinion pieces for De Boerin magazine in 2012. In 2015, the abolition of the European milk quota led to a growing livestock population, which increased manure production and created a risk of the Netherlands exceeding its phosphate limit. The agricultural sector anticipated a phosphate rights system, which some extensive dairy farmers such as Wiersma found unfair because they were able to manage their manure fully. Wiersma started a campaign on social media platform Facebook in 2015 to protest the new system, and she became a lobbyist for Netwerk GRONDig, which had been founded shortly before to represent extensive dairy farmers. GRONDig was included in negotiations with the government, and an exception for this group was created.

Wiersma simultaneously served as policy advisor for the Vereniging Behoud Boer & Milieu, advocating for circular agriculture and surface application of manure over injection, starting in 2016, and for the Dutch Dairy Farmers' Union starting in 2017. NRC noted that her opinion pieces for De Boerin shifted focus from agricultural life to include political viewpoints, criticizing national agricultural policy. She said that experts were circulating one-sided information to cast livestock farmers in a negative light, and she stated that organizations such as Wakker Dier and Natuurmonumenten were spreading propaganda. Wiersma left the Vereniging Behoud Boer & Milieu and the Dutch Dairy Farmers' Union in 2020 and 2021, respectively.

== Politics ==
NRC reported that Wiersma previously voted for the Labour Party and moved towards the political right while a care consultant, believing that the system of benefits was being abused. When the Farmer–Citizen Movement (BBB) was founded in 2019, Wiersma became a board member. She participated in the 2021 general election as the BBB's second candidate, behind party leader Caroline van der Plas. Wiersma received 25,588 preference votes, and she was not elected, as the BBB secured one seat in the House of Representatives. Wiersma subsequently served as a staffer of the BBB's parliamentary group in the House.

She helped establish the BBB's Friesland chapter starting in 2021, and she was on the ballot in the province in the 2023 provincial elections, in which the BBB won fourteen council seats in Friesland (and a total of 137 across the Netherlands). In July 2023, the BBB presented its coalition agreement with the Christian Democratic Appeal, Christian Union, and the Frisian National Party. Wiersma joined the provincial executive and was responsible for agriculture, the Frisian Rural Area Program, and heritage. She eliminated budgets for fair trade and LGBTQ policy, arguing they were not "core tasks" of the province, and she halted construction of nature-friendly shores against the advice of her staff. In the midst of the nitrogen crisis, she believed nitrogen emissions resulting from the construction could better be allocated to farmers left without permits after a 2019 Court of State ruling. Construction was later resumed using emissions-free equipment. Wiersma suspended the province's nature and nitrogen policy in June 2024, weeks after a coalition agreement had been reached nationally by the PVV, VVD, NSC, and BBB.

=== Minister of Agriculture, Fisheries, Food Security and Nature ===
Wiersma was sworn in as Minister of Agriculture, Fisheries, Food Security and Nature on 2 July 2024 as part of the Schoof cabinet. The ministry was simultaneously renamed, having previously been called the Ministry of Agriculture, Nature and Food Quality.

The Netherlands had been mandated by the European Union to stop the deterioration of nature in Natura 2000 sites by 2030, and goals with regard to nitrogen deposition had been enshrined in national legislation. The coalition agreement reduced the fund allocated towards addressing the nitrogen crisis from €25 billion to €5 billion. In September 2024, Wiersma terminated the National Program for Rural Areas, which had been created by the fourth Rutte cabinet in response to the crisis and which tasked provinces with devising plans to improve the quality of nature and water based on a national fund. She presented the outline of her alternative plans and a provisional breakdown of the €5 billion in funding in late November 2024. Wiersma aimed to increase agricultural lands designated as nature reserves from 100,000 ha (250,000 acres) to 280,000 ha (690,000 acres) by expanding subsidies for farmers. The cabinet allocated between €1.25 billion and €2.5 billion towards innovations to reduce nitrogen emissions, and Wiersma planned to set emissions targets for farms instead of prescribing certain measures. The same amount would be available for a voluntary buyout scheme for farmers considering to leave the sector. Wiersma had proposed allocating a larger share to innovation over buyouts, but cabinet members of the VVD and NSC blocked this approach. Furthermore, Wiersma plans to postpone enforcement of nitrogen emissions regulations for a group of farmers left without a permit due to a 2019 Court of State ruling for another three years. The Netherlands Agricultural and Horticultural Association responded that farmers would remain uncertain about their future because of the latter.

Wiersma announced she would suspend her predecessor's promised ban on electric cattle prods during transportation. Opposition parties accused her of ignoring parliamentary directions, while coalition parties VVD and NSC considered introducing legislation to force a ban. Wiersma argued a ban violated the coalition agreement's commitment against regulations beyond those required by the European Union, but she later pivoted under pressure.

== Personal life ==
Wiersma's first child was born in 2006. In 2010, she was a participant of the Dutch version of Farmer Wants a Wife, where she met dairy farmer Gijsbert Bakhuisen from Abcoude. They were married from 2016 until 2019, and they had three more children. After their divorce, she took care of her four children as a single mother. Wiersma later moved to Holwert, where she renovated her house. As of 2024, she was in a relationship with Jord Brinkhuis, whom she had met in 2023.

== Electoral history ==
Electoral history of Femke Wiersma
Year	Body	Party	Pos.	Votes	Result		Ref.
Year	Body	Party	Pos.	Votes	Party seats	Individual	Ref.
2021	House of Representatives	Farmer–Citizen Movement	2	25,588	1	Lost	
2025	House of Representatives	Farmer–Citizen Movement	4	18,903	4	Won	

Political offices
Preceded by Piet Adema	Minister of Agriculture, Fisheries, Food Security and Nature; 2024–2026	Succeeded by Jaimi van Essen
