= Almkerk =

- Village
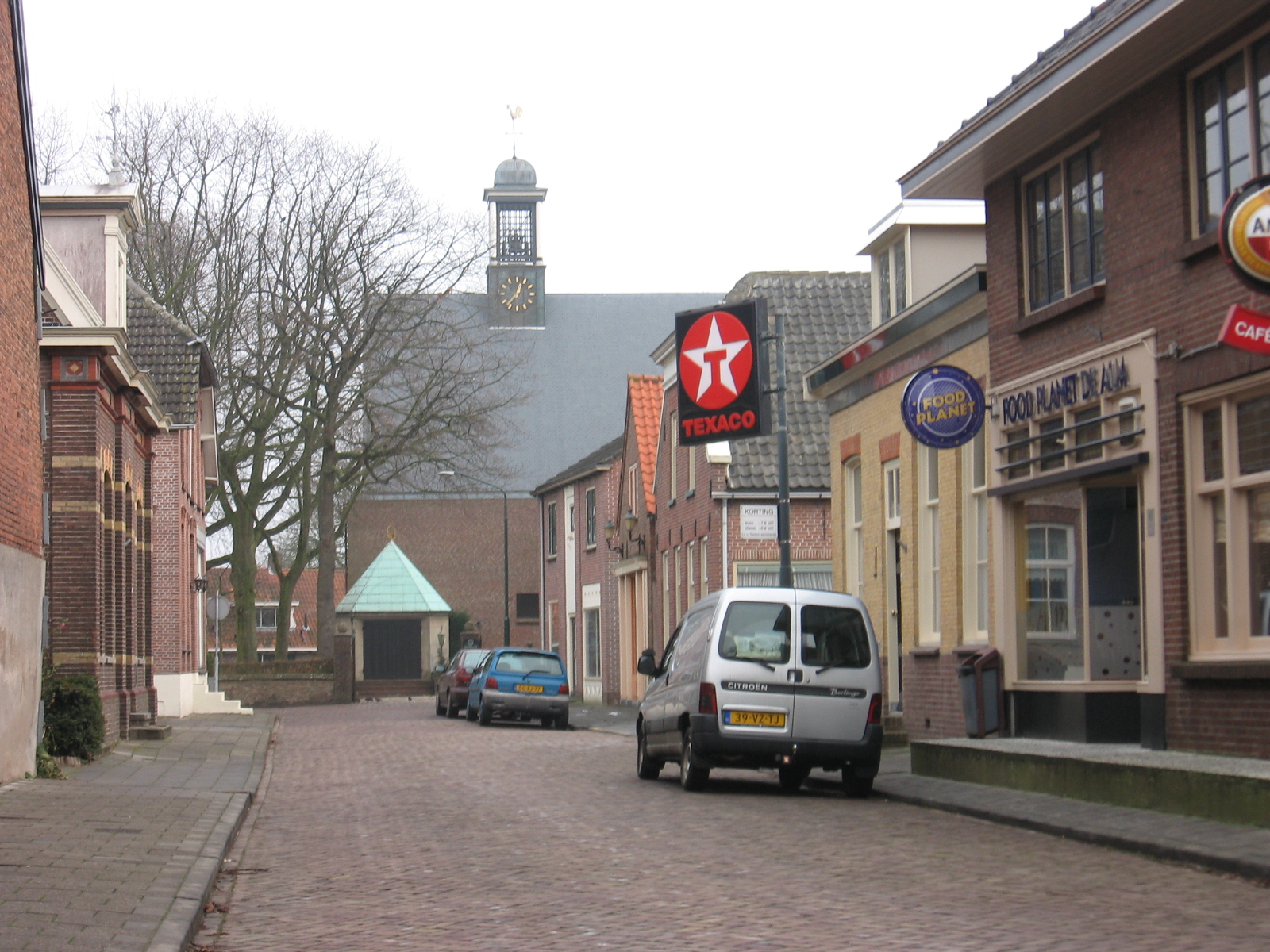
- Centre of Almkerk

- Flag Coat of arms

- Location in the province of North Brabant in the Netherlands Almkerk (Netherlands)
- Coordinates: 51°46′18″N 4°57′37″E
- Country: Netherlands
- Province: North Brabant
- Municipality: Altena

Area
  - Total: 23.03 km^{2} (8.89 sq mi)
- Elevation: 0.2 m (0.66 ft)

Population (2021)
  - Total: 3,720
  - Density: 162/km^{2} (418/sq mi)
- Time zone: UTC+1 (CET)
  - Summer (DST): UTC+2 (CEST)
- Postal code: 4286
- Dialing code: 0183

Almkerk is a village in the municipality of Altena, in the Netherlands. It is located about 7 km south of Gorinchem.

== History ==
The village was first mentioned in 1292 as Almekercke, and means "church on the Alm river". The Alm used to be a distributary of the Meuse. The mouth of river had been dammed before 1230 in Giessen. Almkerk developed on the bank of the Alm river. The Altena Castle was located east of the village.

The polder mill Oude Doornse Molen was built around 1700. The wind mill was in service until 1965. In 1940 and 1944, the polder was inundated by the Dutch and German armies respectively, and Oude Doornse Molen later removed the water again. The mill also removed the water after the North Sea flood of 1953.

Almkerk was home to 320 people in 1840. In 1879, Almkerk absorbed the former municipality of Emmikhoven. The Dutch Reformed church was destroyed in 1945, and rebuilt in 1951. Until 1973, Almkerk was a separate municipality. Since 2019, it is part of the municipality of Altena. However, the town hall is located in Almkerk.

== Sights ==
On the eastern edge of Almkerk, the motte of the former Altena Castle is visible from the road. The castle was probably built in the 12th century. In the 17th century, there was still a tower.

== Notable people ==
- Leendert Antonie Donker (1899–1956), politician
- Hans van Helden (born 1948), former speed skater

== Gallery ==
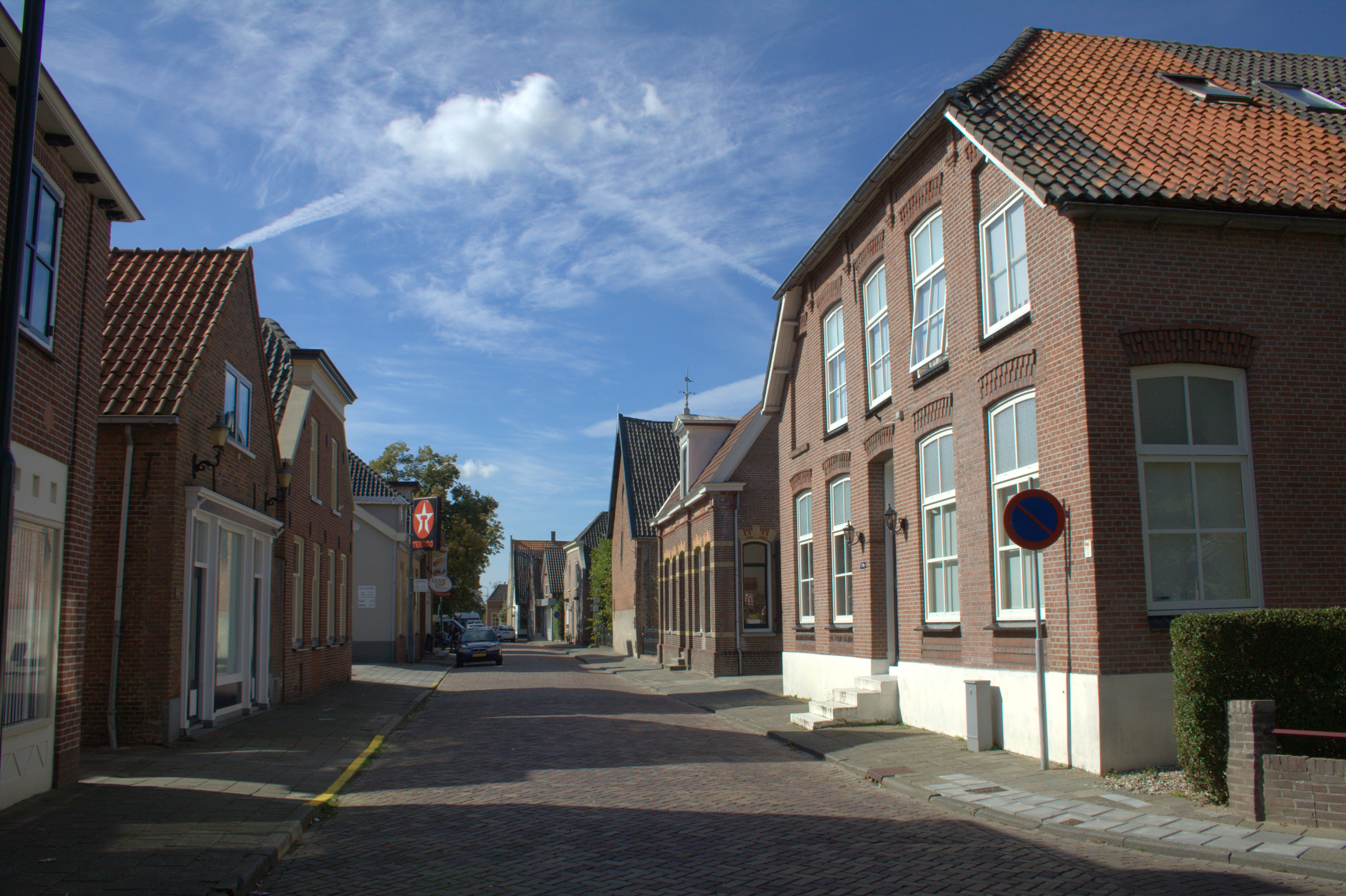
Street view

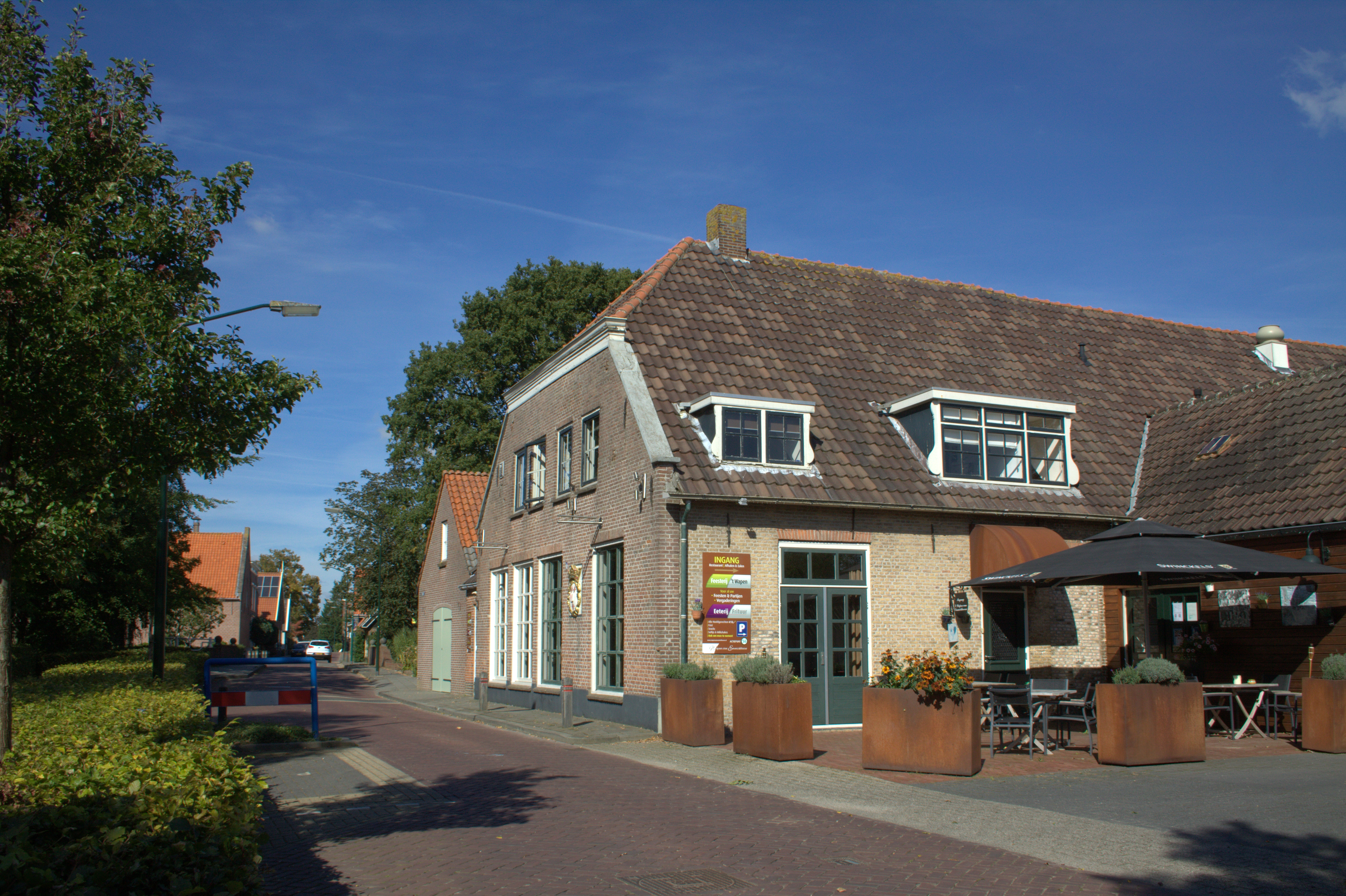
Restaurant in Almkerk

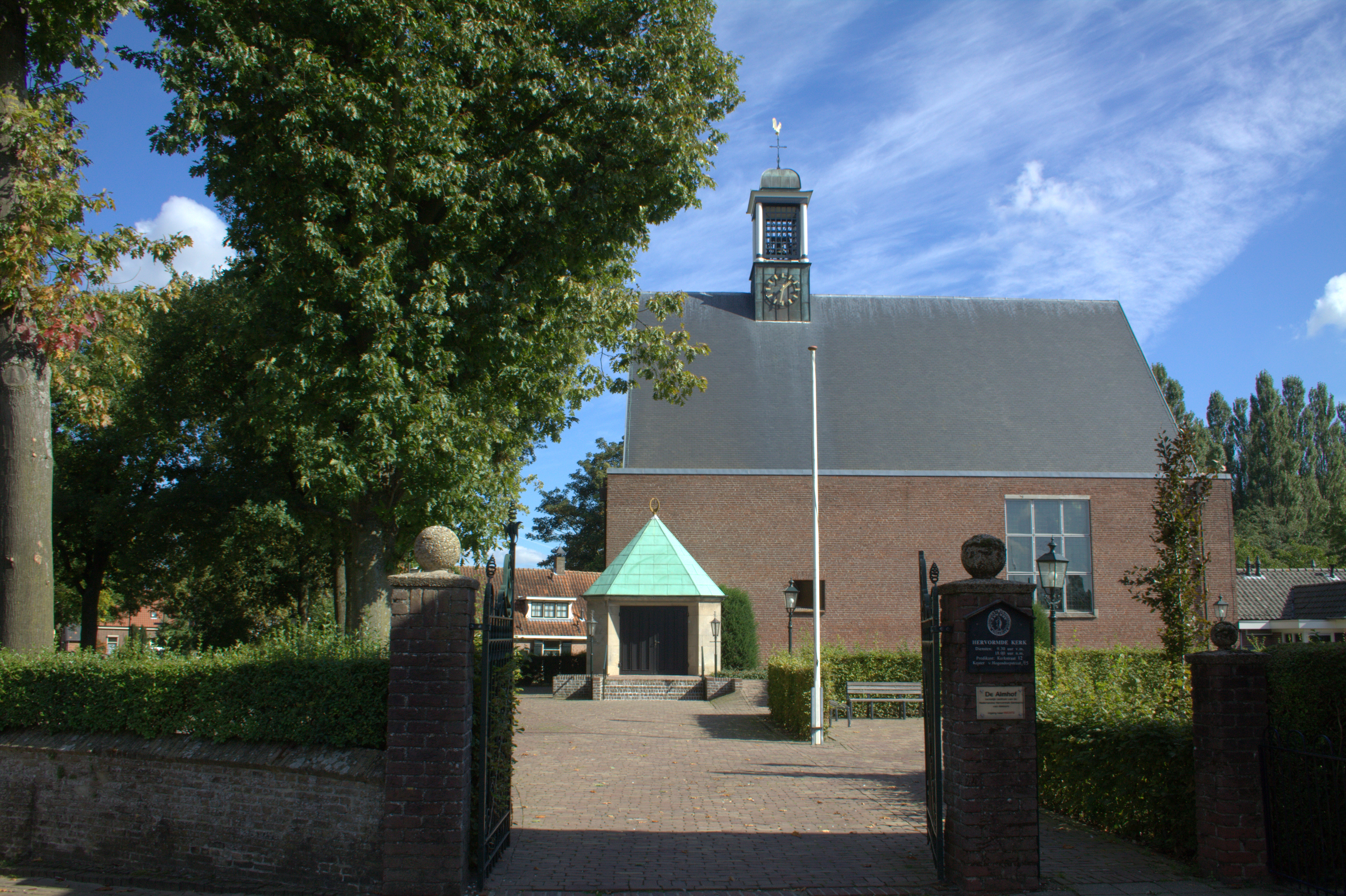
Dutch Reformed church

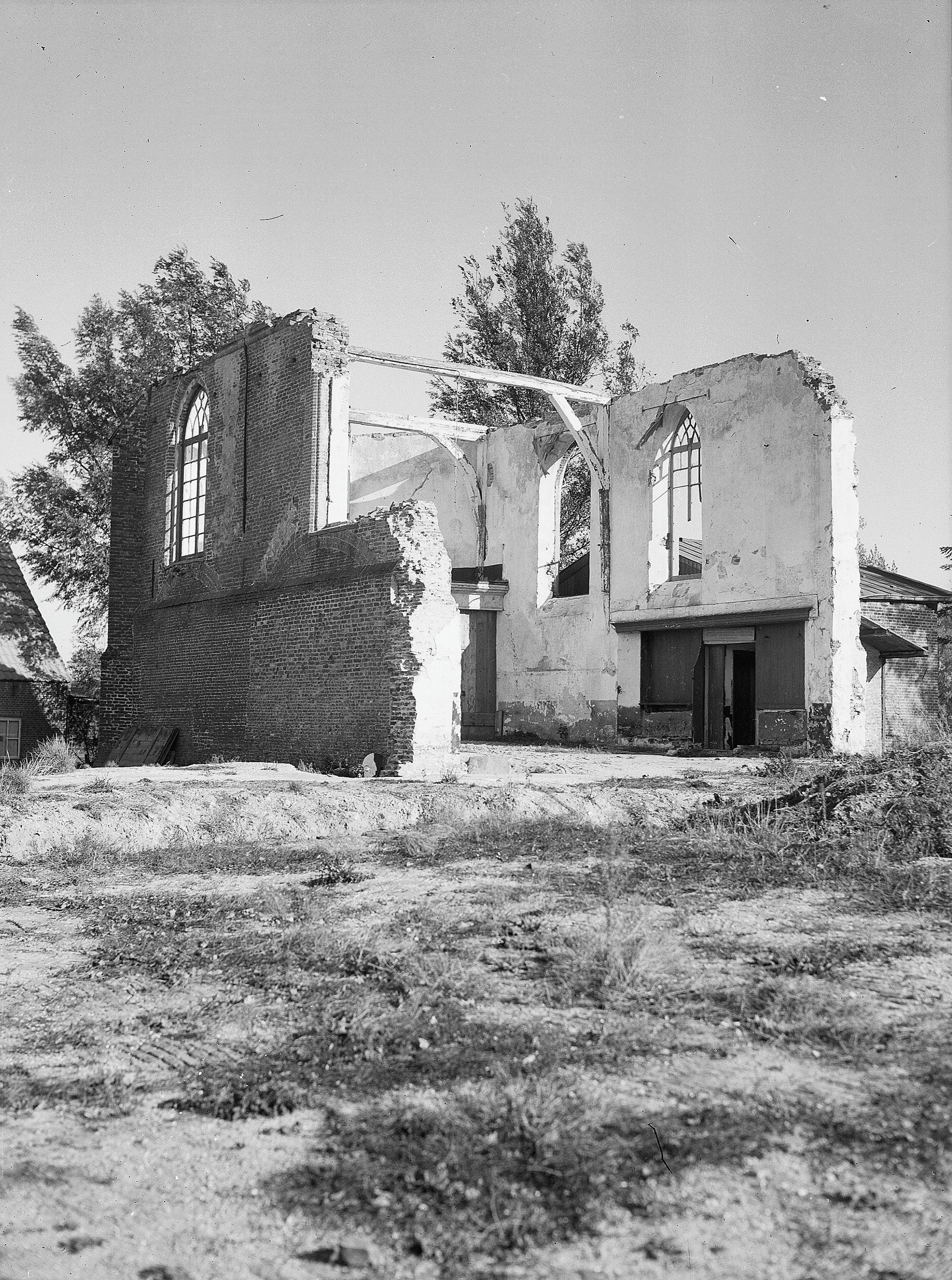
Ruins of the church (1947)
