= Jaimi van Essen =

Dutch politician (born 1991)

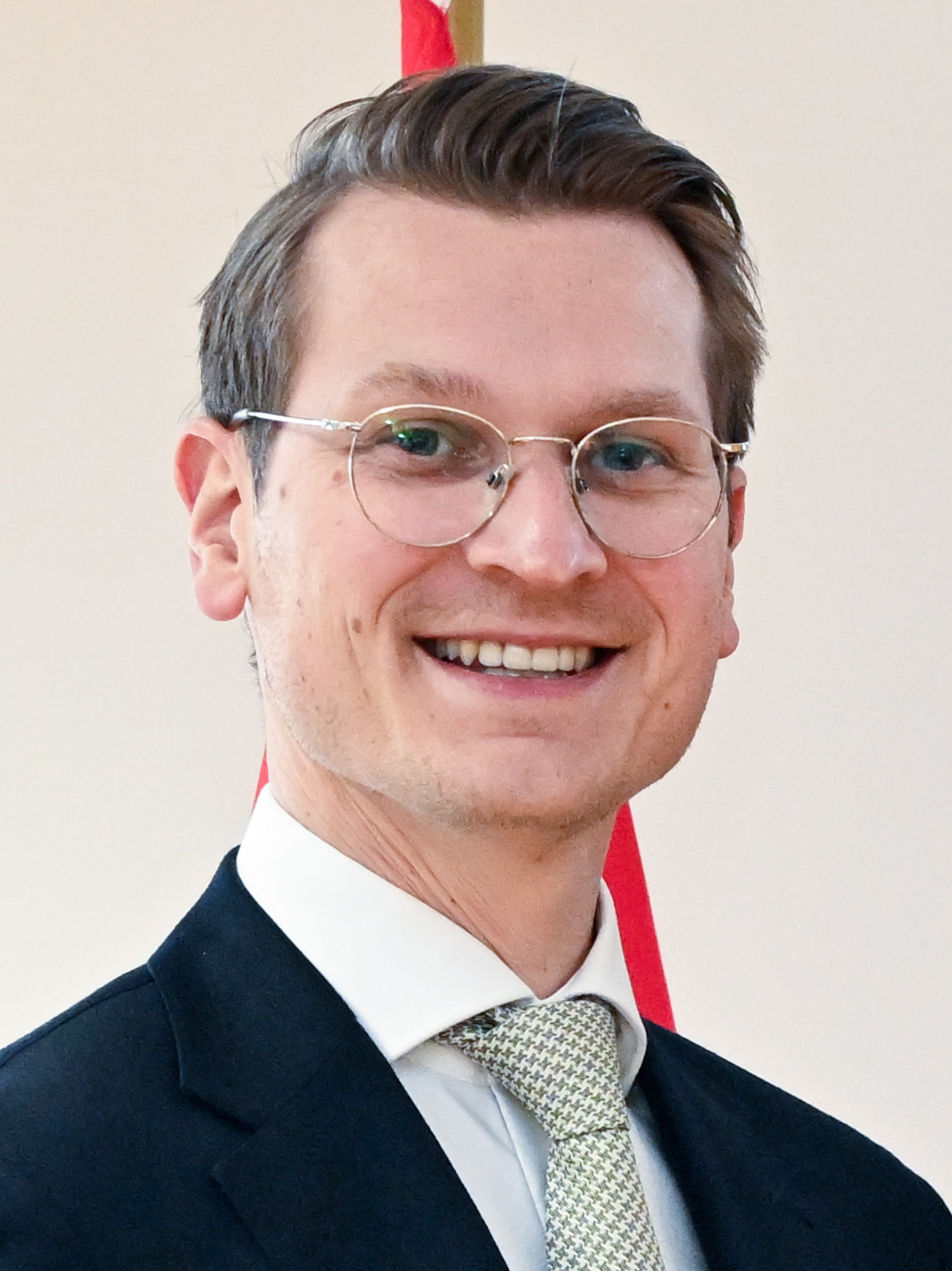
- Van Essen in 2026

Minister of Agriculture, Fisheries, Food Security and Nature
- Incumbent
- Assumed office 23 February 2026
- Prime Minister: Rob Jetten
- Preceded by: Femke Wiersma

Personal details
- Born: 1 November 1991 (age 34) Enschede
- Party: Democrats 66

Jaimi van Essen (born 1 November 1991) is a Dutch politician serving as Minister of Agriculture, Fisheries, Food Security and Nature in the since February 2026. A member of Democrats 66 (D66), he has served as an alderman in the municipal executive of Deventer since 2024. From 2019 to 2024, he was an alderman in Losser.

== Background ==
Van Essen was born in Enschede and was raised in Losser. He undertook studies in political science in Nijmegen and in European Studies in Twente. He is married; he has a wife and a child. He lives in Deventer, but plans to move back to Losser.

== Career ==
After completing his studies, he worked as an adviser at the Ministry of the Interior and Kingdom Relations. In 2014, he was elected to the municipal council of Losser as a representative of D66, and later served as an alderman from 2019 to 2024. In early 2024, Van Essen worked as alderman in Deventer, where his portfolio included energy, sustainability and environment, economic affairs, the port and industrial estates, the inner city, international policy, recreation and tourism, and Deventer marketing.
