= Silvio Erkens =

Dutch politician

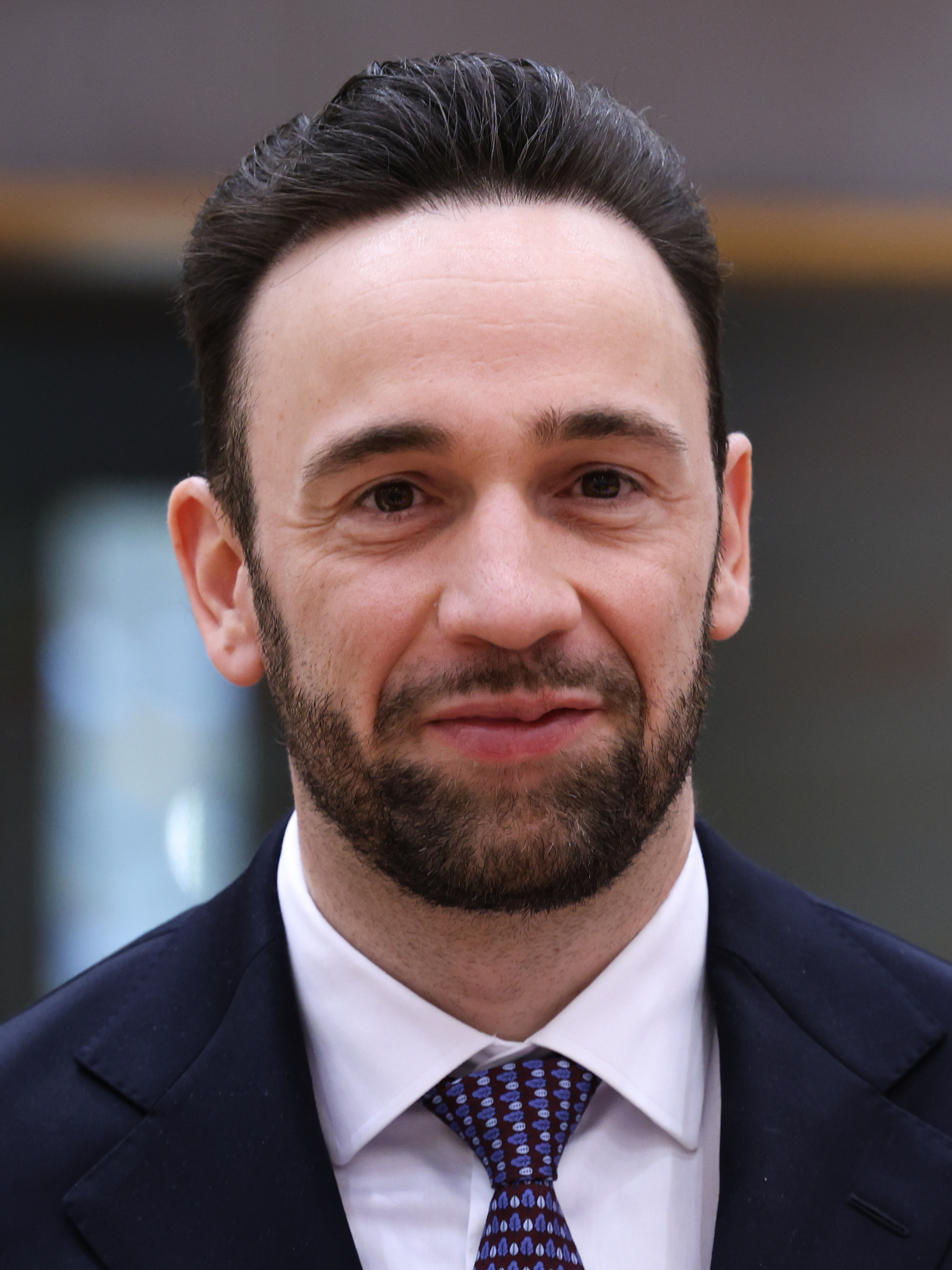
- Erkens in 2026

Member of the House of Representatives
- Incumbent
- Assumed office 31 March 2021

Personal details
- Born: Silvio Peter Augustinus Erkens; 7 August 1990 (age 36) Heerlen, Netherlands
- Party: People's Party for Freedom and Democracy
- Children: 1
- Education: Radboud University Nijmegen; University of London; Columbia University
- Occupation: Consultant
- Website: sowiesosilvio.nl

Silvio Peter Augustinus Erkens (born 7 August 1990) is a Dutch politician, who has held a seat in the House of Representatives since the 2021 general election. He is a member of the conservative-liberal People's Party for Freedom and Democracy (VVD). He previously worked as a consultant.

== Early life and career ==
Erkens was born in 1990 in the Limburg city Heerlen and grew up in nearby Kerkrade as an only child. Both of his parents worked for Statistics Netherlands. Erkens played water polo in his youth and received his vwo diploma from the Kerkrade secondary school Rolduc College. He studied political science at Radboud University Nijmegen starting in 2009 and graduated in 2012 with a Bachelor of Science. While a student, he served as vice-chair of the Nijmegen chapter of the Youth Organisation Freedom and Democracy, the VVD's independent youth wing. Erkens subsequently studied international relations (MSc) for one year at the London School of Economics.

He worked for Boston Consulting Group in the years 2013–16, initially as a junior consultant and later as a senior consultant. Erkens then studied at Columbia Business School, located in New York City, and during his studies also worked for a few months for the executive office of the Secretary-General of the United Nations. He returned to Boston Consulting Group in 2018 as a project manager after obtaining an MBA. Erkens left that company in 2020.

== Politics ==
Erkens joined the VVD while a student. He was campaign manager of the Limburg VVD during the 2019 provincial elections, and he was among the writers of the party's election program for Limburg. Erkens also appeared 19th on the VVD's party list but was not elected to the States of Limburg due to his party receiving five seats.

Erkens was the VVD's 18th candidate in the 2021 general election and helped write the election program. He was elected with 4,043 preference votes and was sworn in to the House of Representatives on 31 March. His specializations were climate, energy policy, and the Dutch Emissions Authority. In the House, Erkens said that Tata Steel's blast furnace in IJmuiden should become more sustainable. He argued for financially assisting the company and for partially nationalizing it if absolutely necessary. He has also been an advocate of nuclear power to mitigate climate change. In 2021, a motion by Erkens and Renske Leijten (SP) was adopted to investigate distance norms for new wind turbines to prevent nuisance to residents, and he supported a halt on their construction in the meantime.

While global energy prices were steeply increasing, Erkens and Henri Bontenbal (CDA) proposed five measures to relieve consumers to Minister for Climate and Energy Policy Rob Jetten in October 2022. Their recommendations included mandating energy suppliers to offer fixed contracts, forbidding them to give discounts to new customers, and subjecting them to a yearly stress test as well as strengthening consumer protections in case of bankruptcy. The VVD and CDA had liberalized the energy market as part of the second Balkenende cabinet. At the same time, the Netherlands tried to lower its reliance on Russian gas due to its invasion of Ukraine in 2022. To increase energy independence, Erkens presented a bill in February 2023 to extract more gas domestically from the North Sea even if it would be more expensive than importing.

Following his re-election in November 2023, Erkens's portfolio was expanded to include climate, energy policy, defense, elections, and constitutional matters. Defense was dropped from his portfolio following the swearing in of the Schoof cabinet. The House passed a motion by Erkens in February 2024 urging the government to plan for the construction of two nuclear reactors in addition to the two already in progress. He also advocated for an electoral threshold of 2% in general elections, arguing that reducing the number of parliamentary groups, then at 15, would streamline debates and decision-making. Minister of the Interior and Kingdom Relations Judith Uitermark (NSC) opposed the proposal, and she stated that she would not incorporate it into her upcoming electoral reform.

In August 2024, the National Political Index concluded that Erkens was the third most diligent House member from installation in 2023 to July 2024.

=== House committee assignments ===
==== 2021–2023 term ====
- Committee for Agriculture, Nature and Food Quality
- Contact group Belgium
- Contact group Germany
- Contact group United Kingdom
- Committee for Economic Affairs and Climate Policy
- Committee for Finance
- Committee for Infrastructure and Water Management
- Public Expenditure committee

==== 2023–present term ====
- Committee for Economic Affairs
- Public Expenditure committee
- Contact group Belgium
- Contact group Germany
- Contact group United Kingdom
- Committee for Climate Policy and Green Growth

== Personal life ==
He lives in Kerkrade and has been married to his wife Samita, who is part of an Indian family residing in Switzerland, since 2020. They met each other in New York City and have a daughter. Erkens is a kickboxer.

== Electoral history ==
Electoral history of Silvio Erkens
Year	Body	Party	Pos.	Votes	Result		Ref.
Year	Body	Party	Pos.	Votes	Party seats	Individual	Ref.
2021	House of Representatives	People's Party for Freedom and Democracy	18	4,043	34	Won	
2023	House of Representatives	People's Party for Freedom and Democracy	11	6,472	24	Won	
2025	House of Representatives	People's Party for Freedom and Democracy	8	5,446	22	Won	
