= Andel, Netherlands =

Andel
- Village
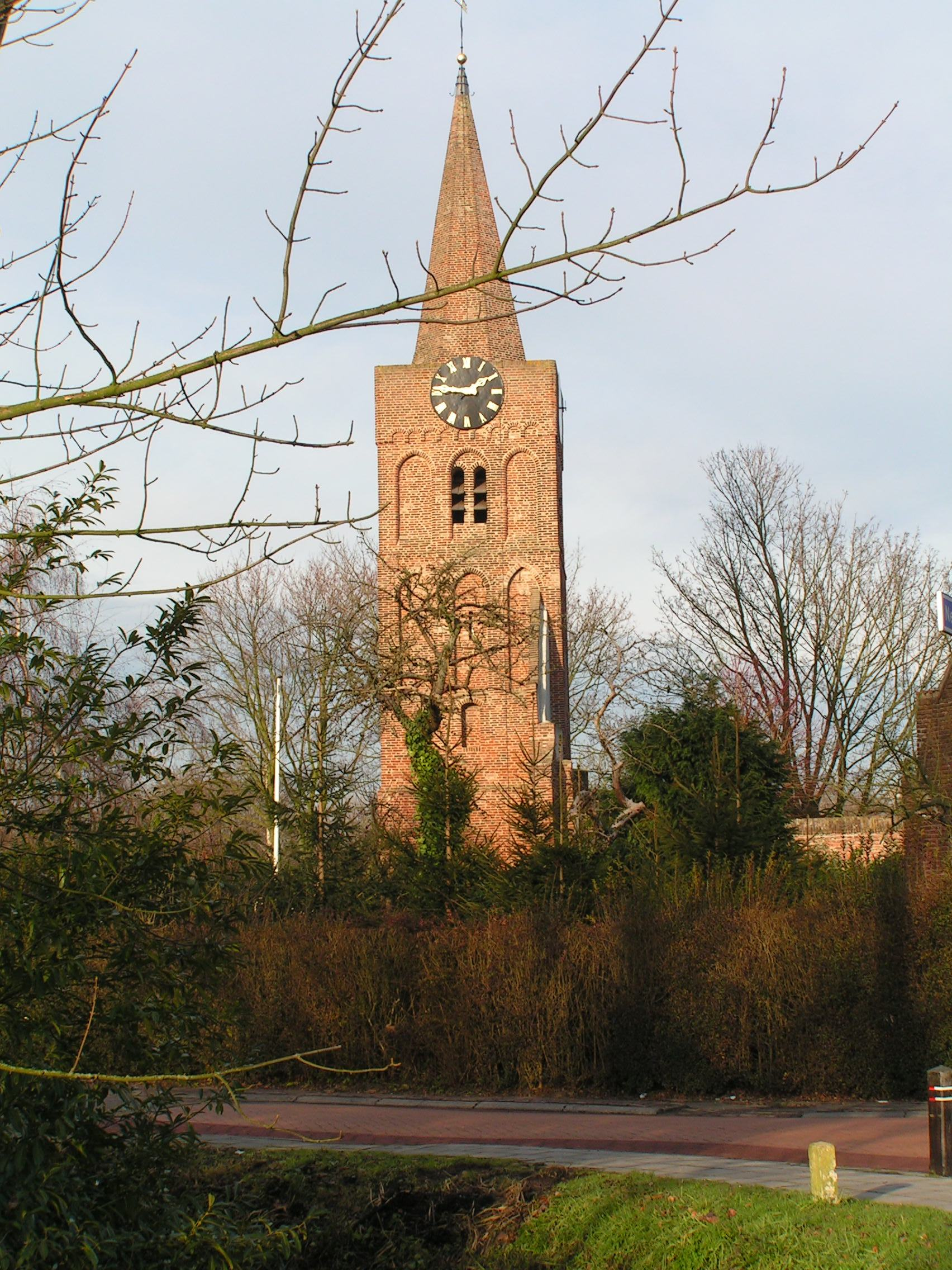
- 14th century Romboutstoren (Rombouts tower) in Andel

- Flag Coat of arms

- Location in the province of North Brabant in the Netherlands Andel (Netherlands)
- Coordinates: 51°47′2″N 5°3′14″E
- Country: Netherlands
- Province: North Brabant
- Municipality: Altena

Area
  - Total: 6.23 km^{2} (2.41 sq mi)
- Elevation: 1.4 m (4.6 ft)

Population (2021)
  - Total: 2,530
  - Density: 406/km^{2} (1,050/sq mi)
- Time zone: UTC+1 (CET)
  - Summer (DST): UTC+2 (CEST)
- Postal code: 4281
- Dialing code: 0183
- Major roads: N267, N322

Andel is a village in the municipality of Altena, North Brabant, in the Netherlands. It is located about 7 km southeast of Gorinchem. On the southern bank of the Afgedamde Maas, its history is strongly connected with various rivers.

== Prehistory ==
Geologically, Andel is on the southern edge of the Holocene Echteld formation, with river clay on river sand. The area has seen various fossil riverbeds and their natural levees.

In the Middle Neolithic, a crevasse splay developed around 3570 years BCE into the north-south Zaltbommel-Nederhemert riverbed, the name referring to the nearby places of Zaltbommel and Nederhemert; the downstream part is called the Andel bed. In the Late Neolithic, from 2475 to 1410 BCE, the Biesheuvel-Hamer bed was active, locally also north-south. On this bed and levees, although not specifically in Andel, archeologists have found Middle Bronze Age to Late Middle Ages artifacts. From the Middle Iron Age (around 325 BCE) until the High Middle Ages, the Alm river system was active; parts are still visible in the landscape.

== History ==
A Roman road on a natural levee and other finds indicate habitation during the Roman period.

From the Early and High Middle Ages up to the present day, two settlement centers can be distinguished: Op-Andel and Neer-Andel. Op-Andel was first mentioned in 850 as Analo "higher (upstream) lo", where a lo is a lightly forested area. Neer-Andel was mentioned in 1382 as dat derp tot Uutandele "the settlement at lower Andel"; Uutandele can also be read as "Uit-Andel", "Outer Andel". Also, a Celtic origin has been proposed, linking the name to an(am) "moor".

Op-Andel was the oldest and most important, but being at the outside of a meander, it has been eroded away by the stream and the floods, and although the settlement gradually was relocated to the south and the west to evade the river, it is nowadays a minor part, merged into Neer-Andel. Although the distinction remains, in the second half of the twentieth century Andel has more and more become one village.

The medieval settlements developed on the natural levees along the river Alm, which in Roman times was part of the Waal drainage basin. During the Middle Ages it became part of the Maas (Meuse) basin and silted up when the Maas took another course.

Although in modern times the North Sea coast is about 65 kilometres (40 mi) west of Andel, Neer-Andel's hinterland lies nearly at sea level (NAP) and the Op-Andel's about 60 centimetres (2.0 ft) higher. The disastrous St. Elizabeth's flood of 1421 inundated these polders and the surrounding Land van Altena. It also diverted the Maas into small streams, which hindered the drainage of the southern parts of the Dutch river area and resulted in countless river floodings. On the other hand, the river and its floods provided subsistence in the form of farming in the fertile polders and river fishery. Even so, the area remained poor and the floodings were damaging, especially when ice floes blocked the confluence of Maas and Waal near Woudrichem. In 1904 the Maas was rerouted, and the old bedding at Andel is called the Afgedamde Maas.

== Administration and inhabitants ==
Andel was home to 738 people in 1840. Until 1973, Andel was an independent municipality when it was merged into Woudrichem. In 2019, it became part of Altena. As of 2021, the village had 2,530 inhabitants.

== Churches ==
The 14th century Rombout tower and wall stumps are remains of the demolition of a late-Gothic church. The characteristic brick spire is prone to leaks, and the building has been repaired and restored several times, e.g., in 1879, 1954, and 2021.

The current Dutch Reformed church dates from the 16th century and was enlarged in 1852 and around 1950.

== Gallery ==
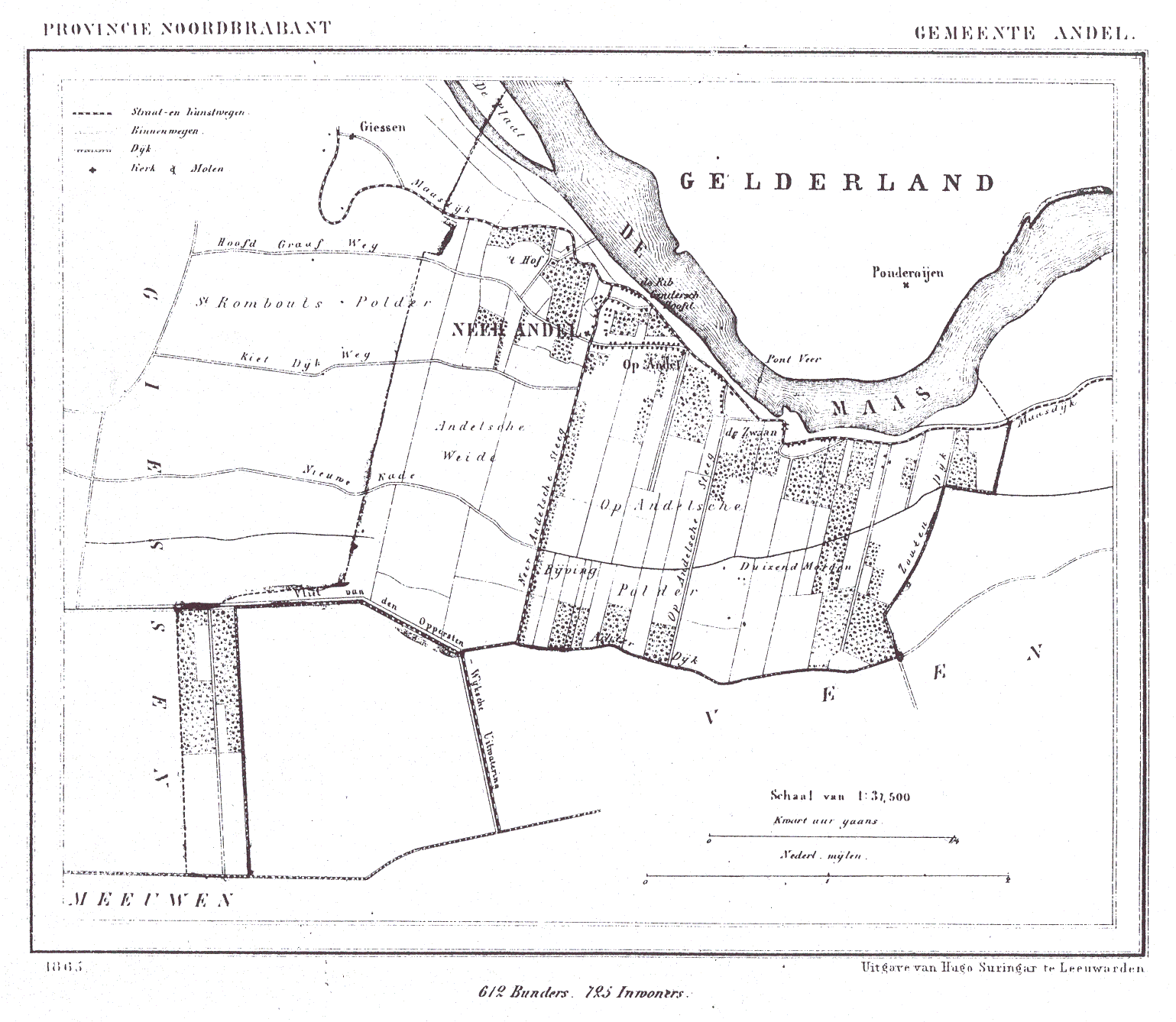
1865 map of the municipality.

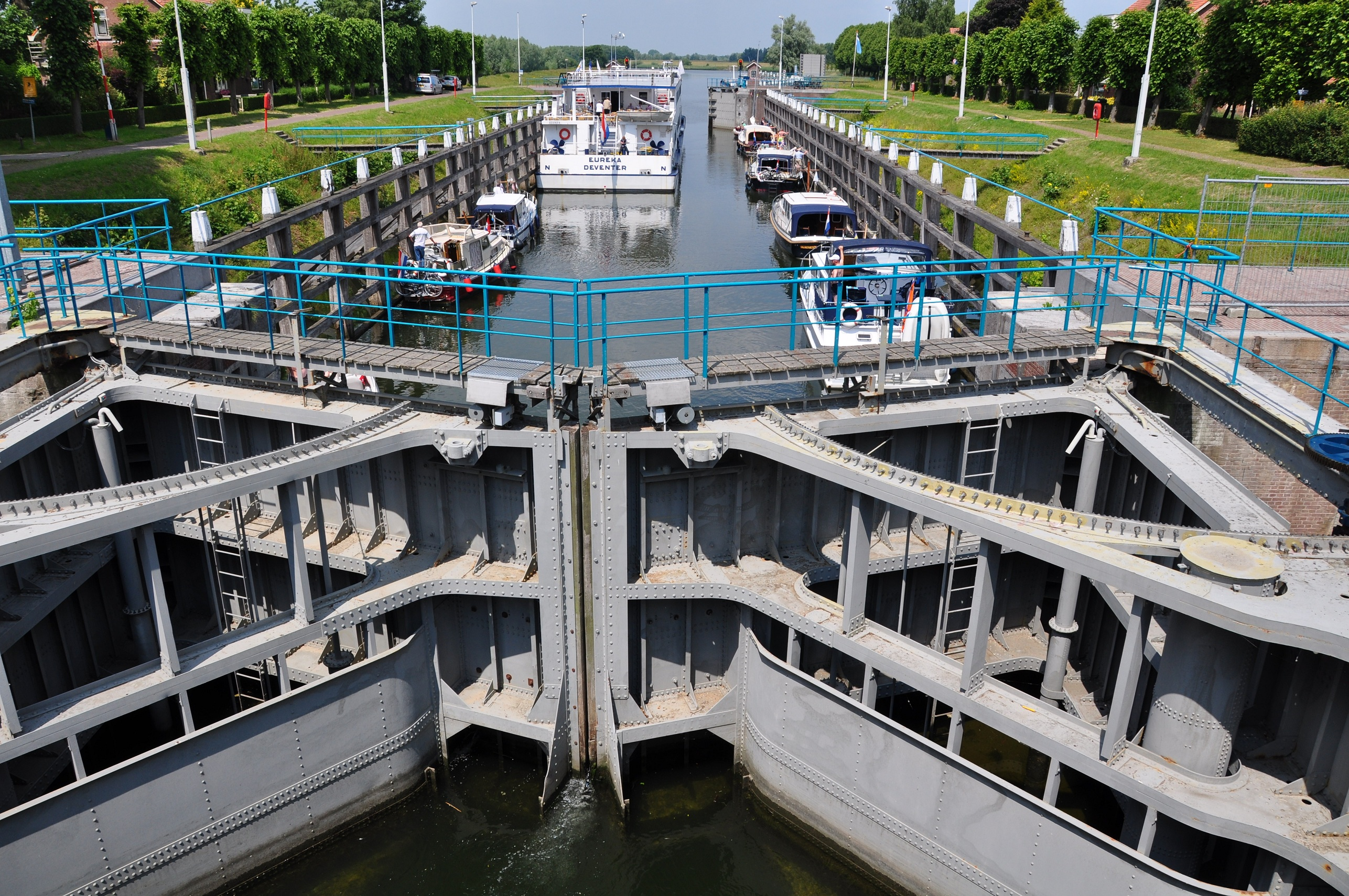
Lock in the Afgedamde Maas

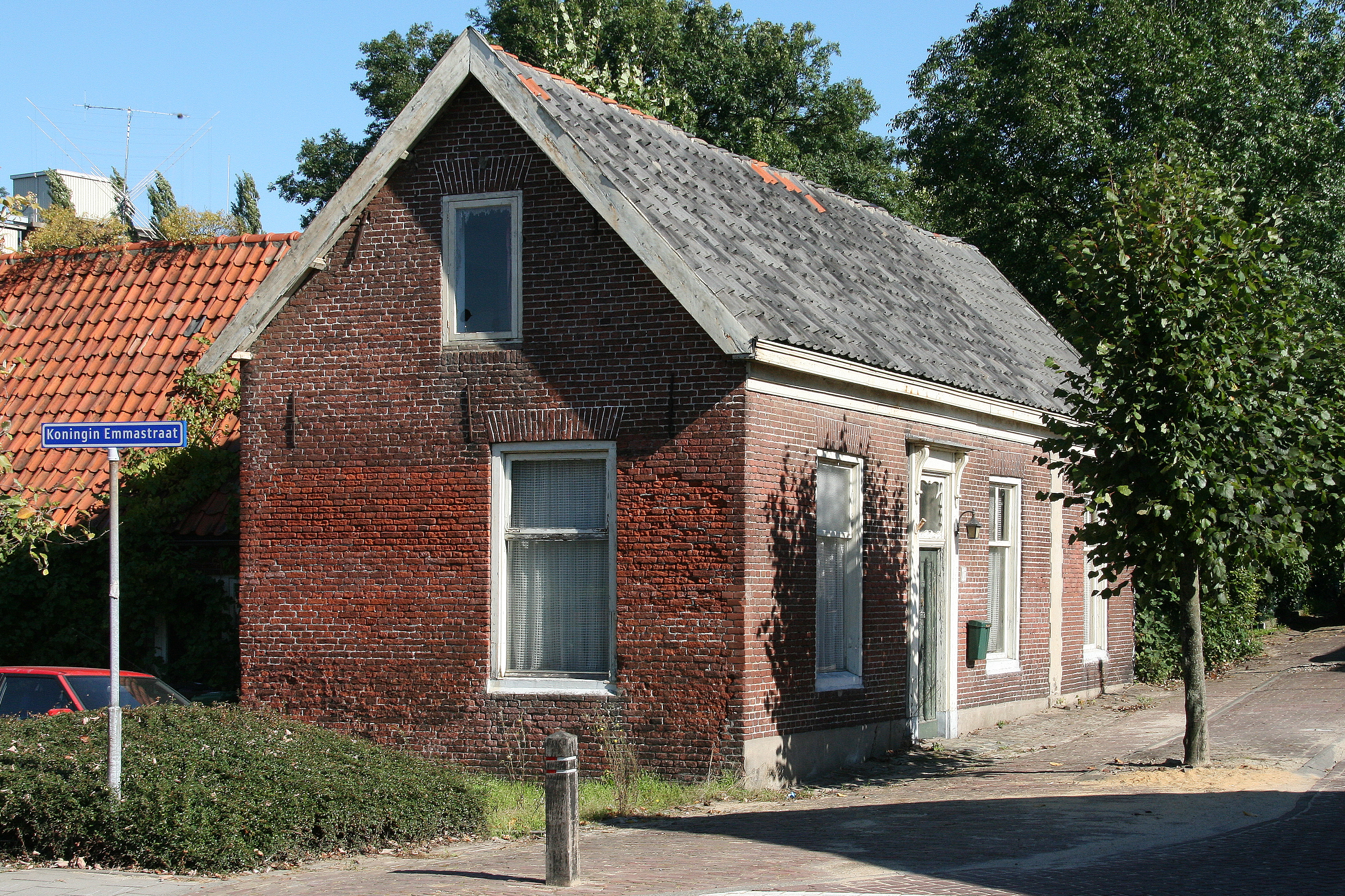
House in Andel

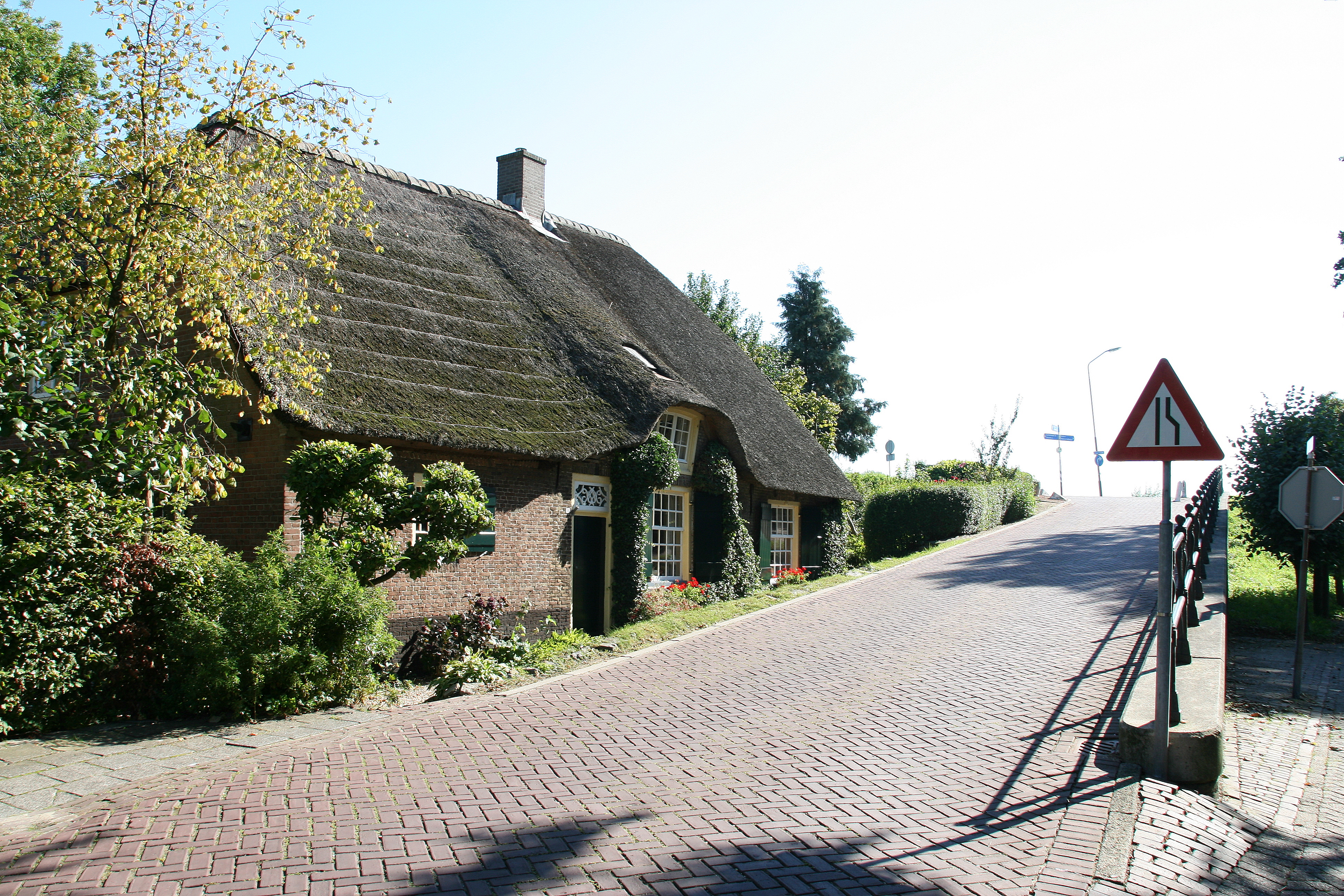
House in Andel
