= Giessen, Netherlands =

Giessen
- Village
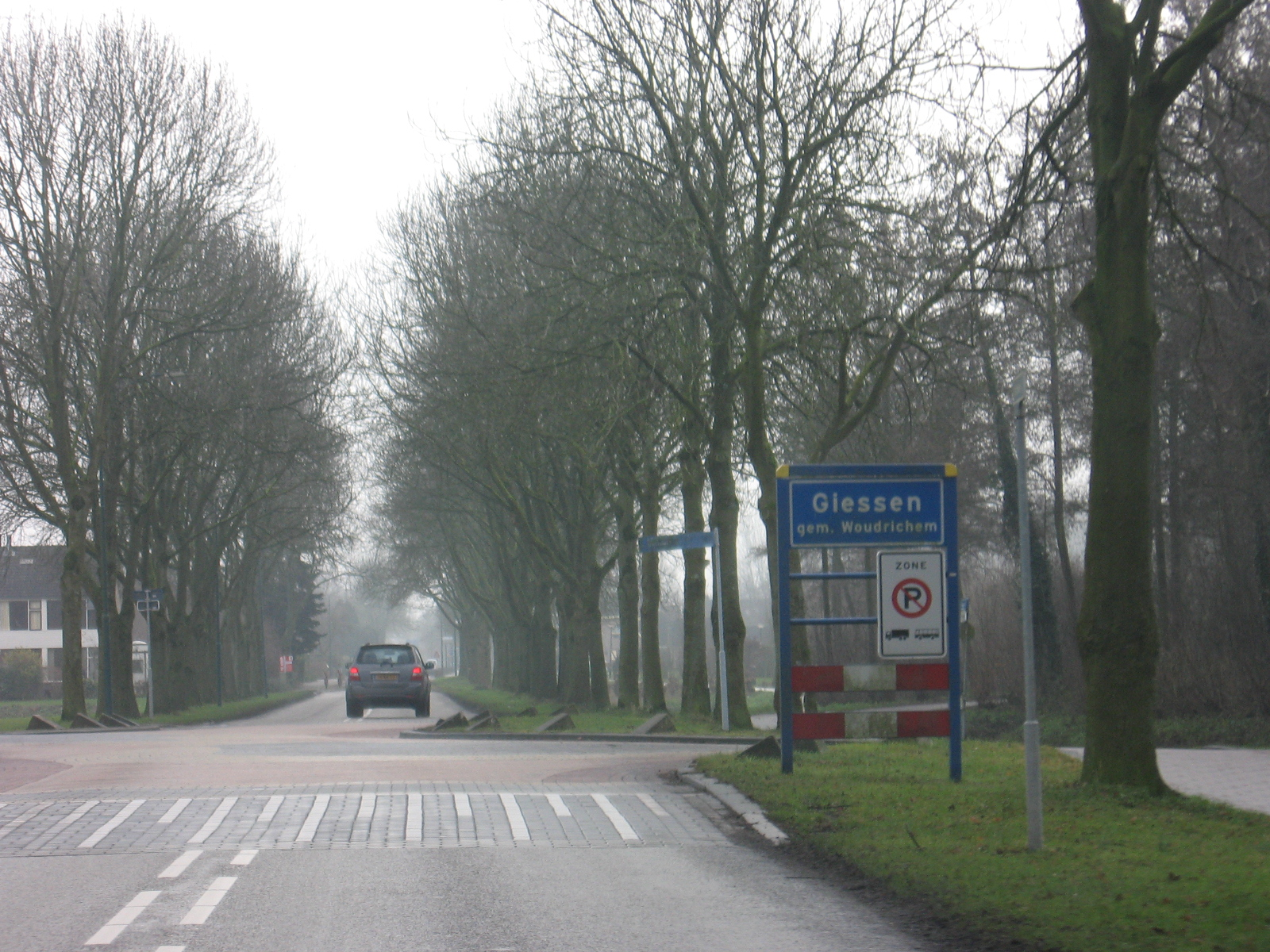
- Entrance of Giessen

- Flag Coat of arms

- Location in the province of North Brabant in the Netherlands Giessen (Netherlands)
- Coordinates: 51°47′19″N 5°1′58″E
- Country: Netherlands
- Province: North Brabant
- Municipality: Altena

Area
  - Total: 5.46 km^{2} (2.11 sq mi)
- Elevation: 1.7 m (5.6 ft)

Population (2021)
  - Total: 1,645
  - Density: 301/km^{2} (780/sq mi)
- Time zone: UTC+1 (CET)
  - Summer (DST): UTC+2 (CEST)
- Postal code: 4283
- Dialing code: 0183

Giessen is a village in the Dutch province of North Brabant. It is located in the municipality of Altena, about 7 km southeast of Gorinchem.

== History ==
The village was first mentioned in 1178 as Giscen. It is named after a river, however the etymology is unclear. Giessen developed in the Middle Ages along the Afgedamde Maas.

The Dutch Reformed church was dates was built on a terp (artificial living hill) in the 14th century. In 1755, the tower collapsed due to frequent flooding. The church was enlarged in 1856.

Giessen was home to 360 people in 1840. Giessen was a separate municipality until 1973, when it became a part of the former municipality of Woudrichem. Giessen nowadays forms a single urban area with Rijswijk.

== Sights ==
Giessen is part of the New Dutch Water Line. Fort Giessen has been preserved, and was constructed between 1878 and 1881.

In 2013 Giessen Castle was rediscovered in the village. There are no visible traces of this castle, except for a small monument that marks its location.

== Notable inhabitants ==
- Carola Schouten (born 1977), politician

== Gallery ==
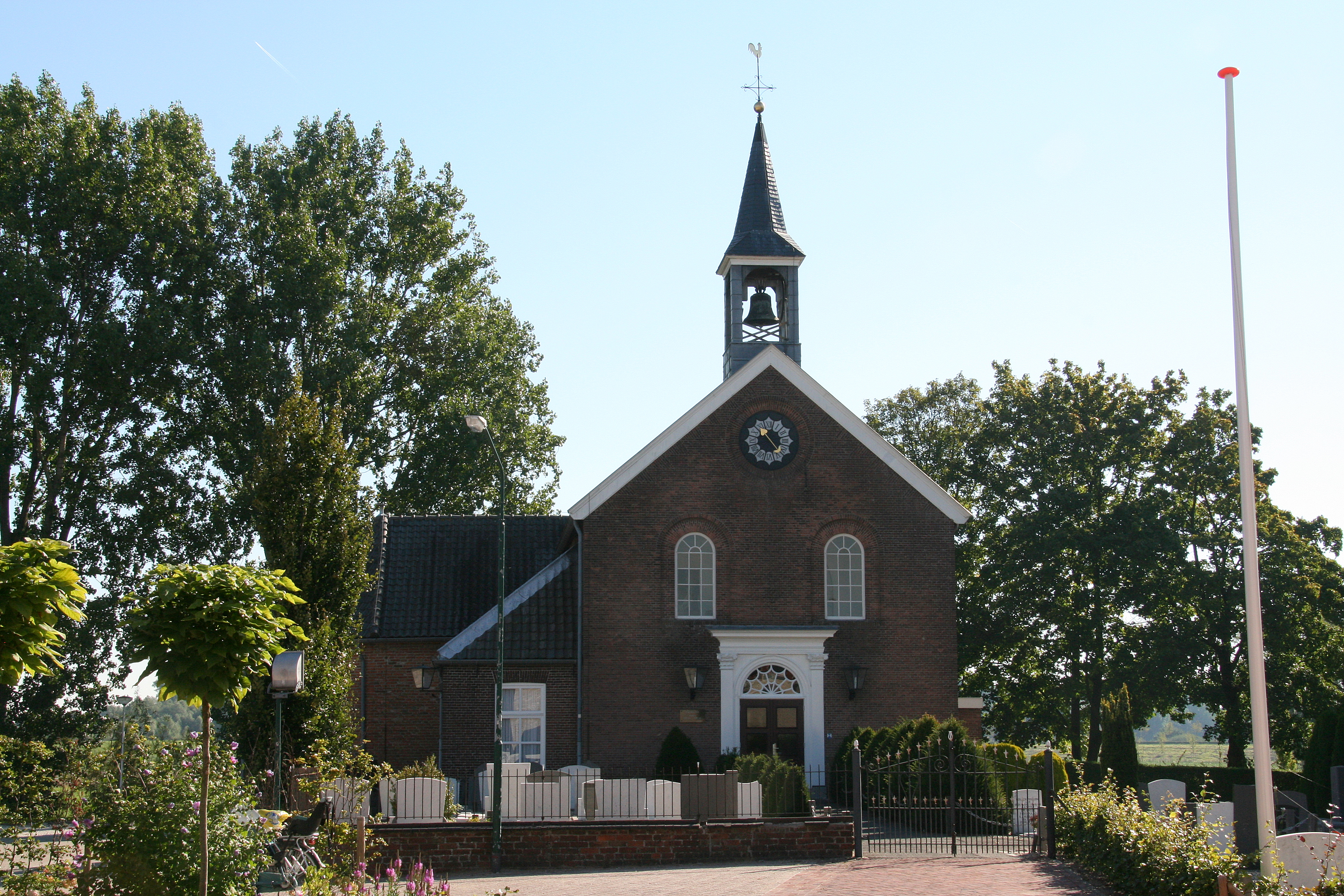
Dutch Reformed church

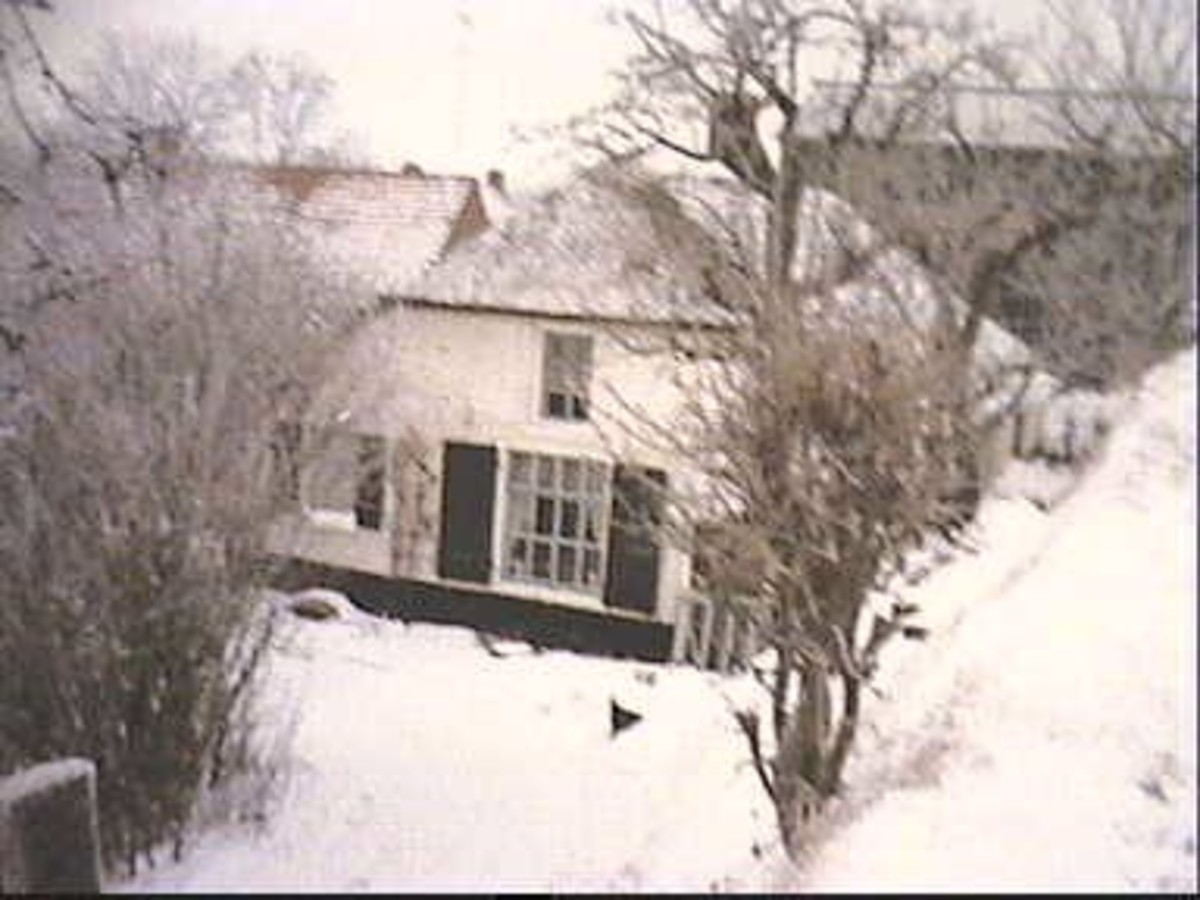
Farm in Giessen

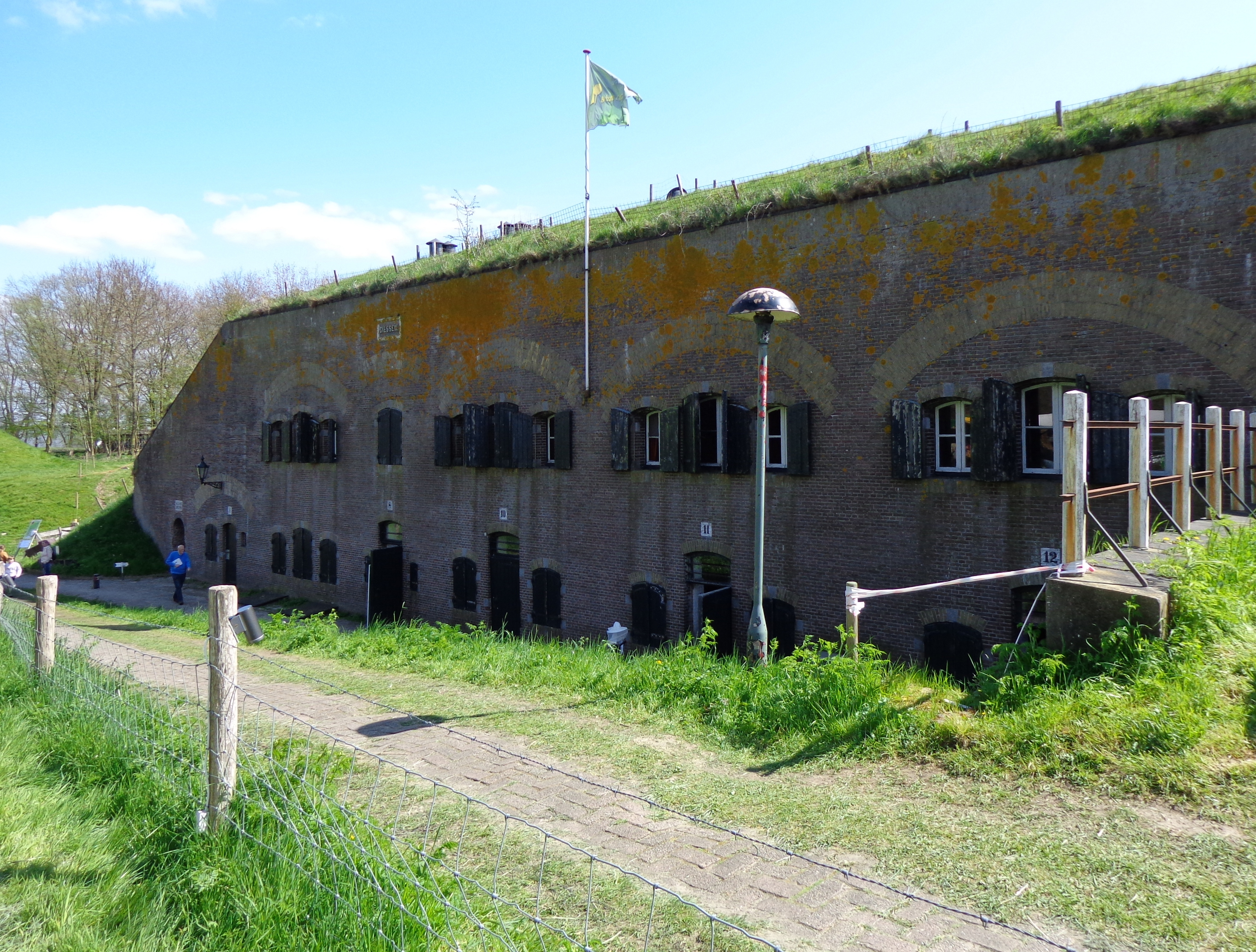
Fort Giessen

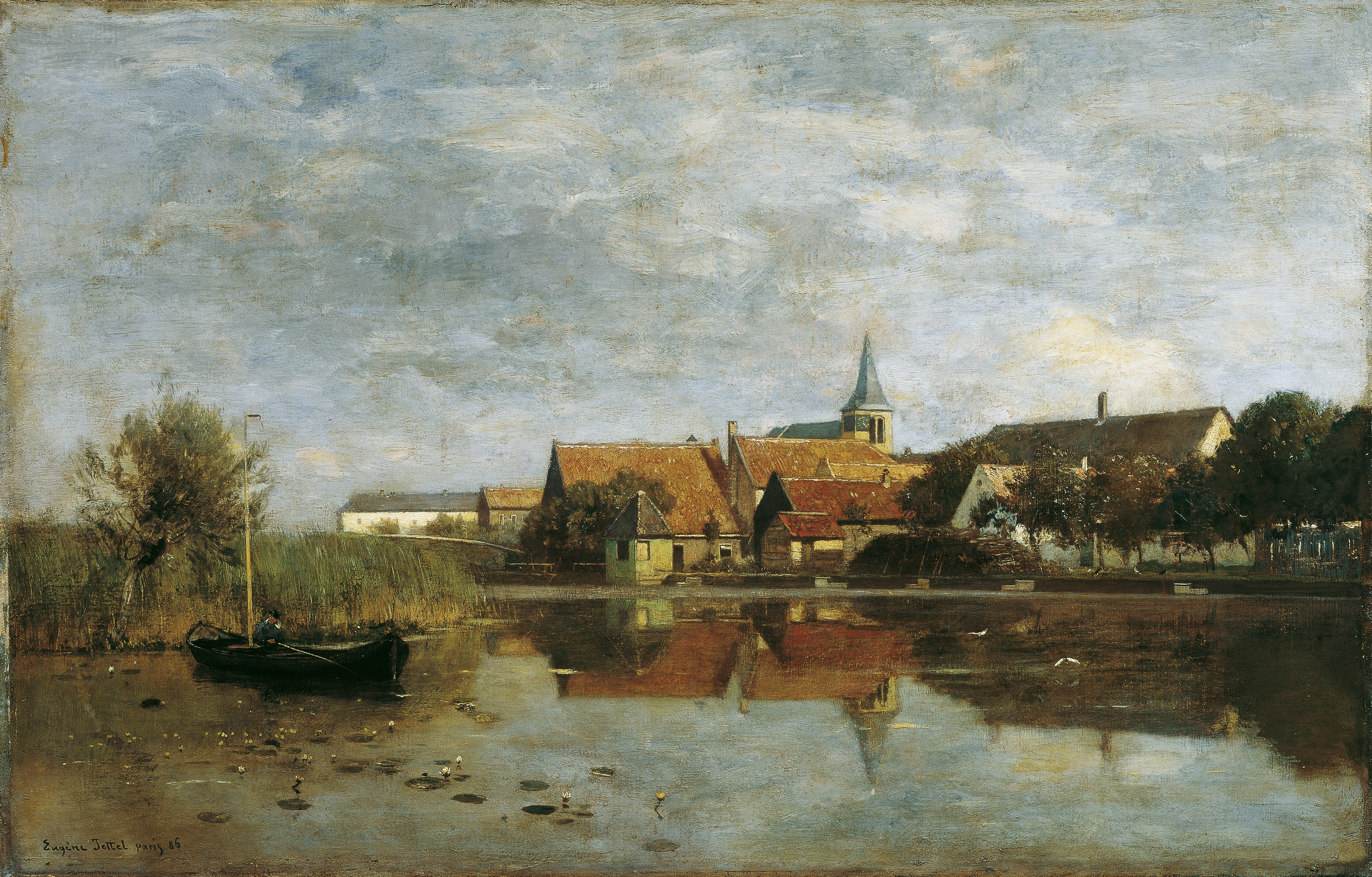
Painting of Giessen by Eugen Jettel (1886)
