= Rogger =

Glass-fibre (fiberglass) motor-sailer

The Rogger is a glass-fibre (fiberglass) motor-sailer produced in the Netherlands. It was designed by Dick Lefeber (1927–2000), and stands out owing to its sturdy appearance and heavy construction.

From 1969 through 1976, Rogger hulls were produced by Polyboat/Polymarin/Halmatic, and were finished out by Eista Werf in Ammerzoden and Nederhemert in the Netherlands. From 1997 to 1995, the final Rogger models were finished out at Stangate Marine in Littlehampton, England, and were sold as the Rogger 36 Ketch, Ushant 41 and Atlas Rogger 46.

In total, an estimated 90 vessels of the Rogger type were built: 73 of the Rogger 10.5 (meters), 11 of the Rogger 12.5/Ushant 41 and 6 of the Rogger 14/Atlas Rogger 46. The Rogger Motorsailer Club is aware of the locations of 67 Rogger motorsailers (75% of the fleet). There is also a larger version of the Rogger known as the Banjer 37, which was built in The Netherlands and has its own club.

A class of steel motorboats is also named Rogger, but these vessels are not the same as the Rogger motorsailers.
