= Land van Altena =

Former fiefdom in North Brabant province, Netherlands

Coordinates: 51°46′27″N 4°55′19″E

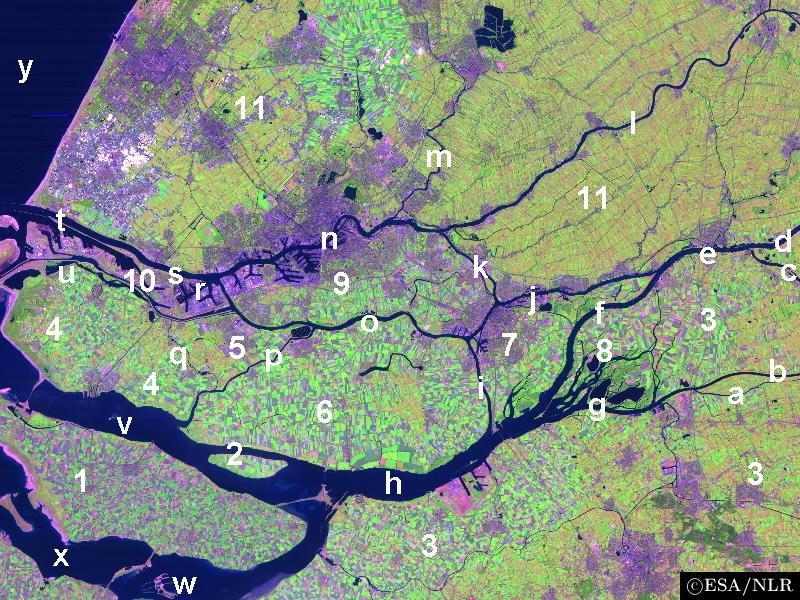
Land van Altena (region 3 minus the southeast)

The Land of Altena (Dutch: Land van Altena) is a historical region and former fiefdom of the Lords of Altena, historically part of the County of Holland, but since 1815 located in the Dutch province of North Brabant.

The Land of Altena lies on a river island in the estuary of the rivers Rhine and Meuse. It is enclosed by the rivers Boven Merwede (north), Afgedamde Maas (east) and Oude Maasje/Bergse Maas (south) and by the regions De Biesbosch (west) and the (former) Land of Heusden (southeast). It contains the former municipalities of Werkendam (the largest town of the island), and Woudrichem (the historical centre of the island and whose village Almkerk contains the site of the former castle of Altena).

Since 1904 it is united with the Land of Heusden (only the part above the Bergse Maas) as the Land of Heusden and Altena.

Unlike most parts of North Brabant the Land of Altena has a strong Protestant (Calvinist) character. Former Prime Minister Hendrikus Colijn (1869–1944) had his roots in this region.
