= Land van Heusden en Altena =

Region in North Brabant, Netherlands

Coordinates: 51°46′18″N 4°57′37″E

Land van Heusden en Altena Land van Heusden en Altena
- region
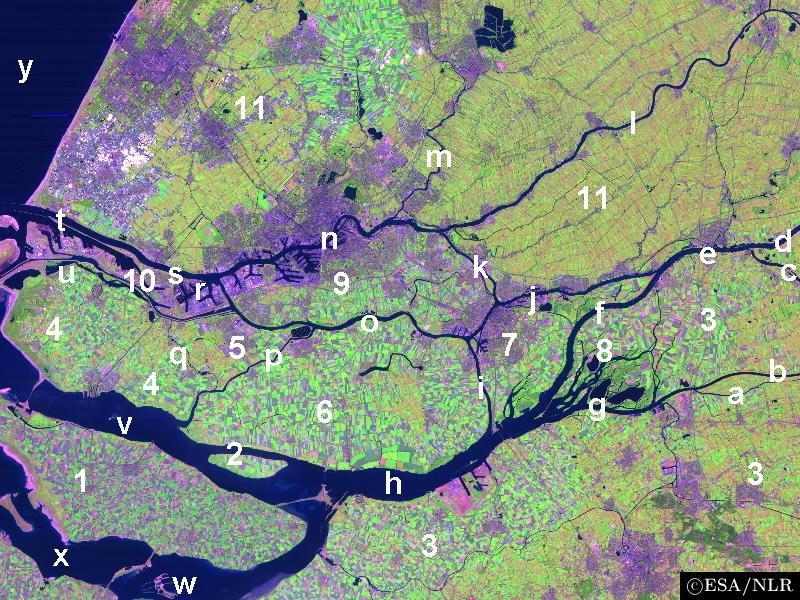
- Land van Heusden en Altena (region 3)
- Interactive map of Land van Heusden en Altena

The Land of Heusden and Altena (Dutch: Land van Heusden en Altena) is a region located in the Dutch province of North Brabant. In 1904 it consisted of the historical regions Land van Altena and Land van Heusden (only the part above the Bergse Maas). Historically this region has been a part of North Brabant since 1815. During the Dutch Republic it belonged to Holland. It resembles similar landscapes to the Holland provinces, e.g. the Alblasserwaard, which is situated just north of the region.

The Land of Heusden and Altena lies on a river island in the estuary of the rivers Rhine and Meuse. It is enclosed by the rivers Boven Merwede (north), Afgedamde Maas (east) and Oude Maasje/Bergse Maas (south), and by the region of De Biesbosch, including De Biesbosch National Park (west).

The Land van Heusden en Altena coincides with the municipality of Altena, except for the most western part, which belongs to De Biesbosch. Werkendam is the largest town, and Woudrichem the historical centre of the island. The former municipalities of Werkendam and Woudrichem formed the region of the Land van Altena, while the former municipality of Aalburg formed the region of the Land van Heusden.

Unlike most parts of North Brabant, the Land of Heusden and Altena has a strong Protestant (Calvinist) character. Former Prime Minister Hendrikus Colijn (1869–1944) had his roots in this region.
