= Giessen Castle =

- Kasteel Giessen
- Giessen, Netherlands
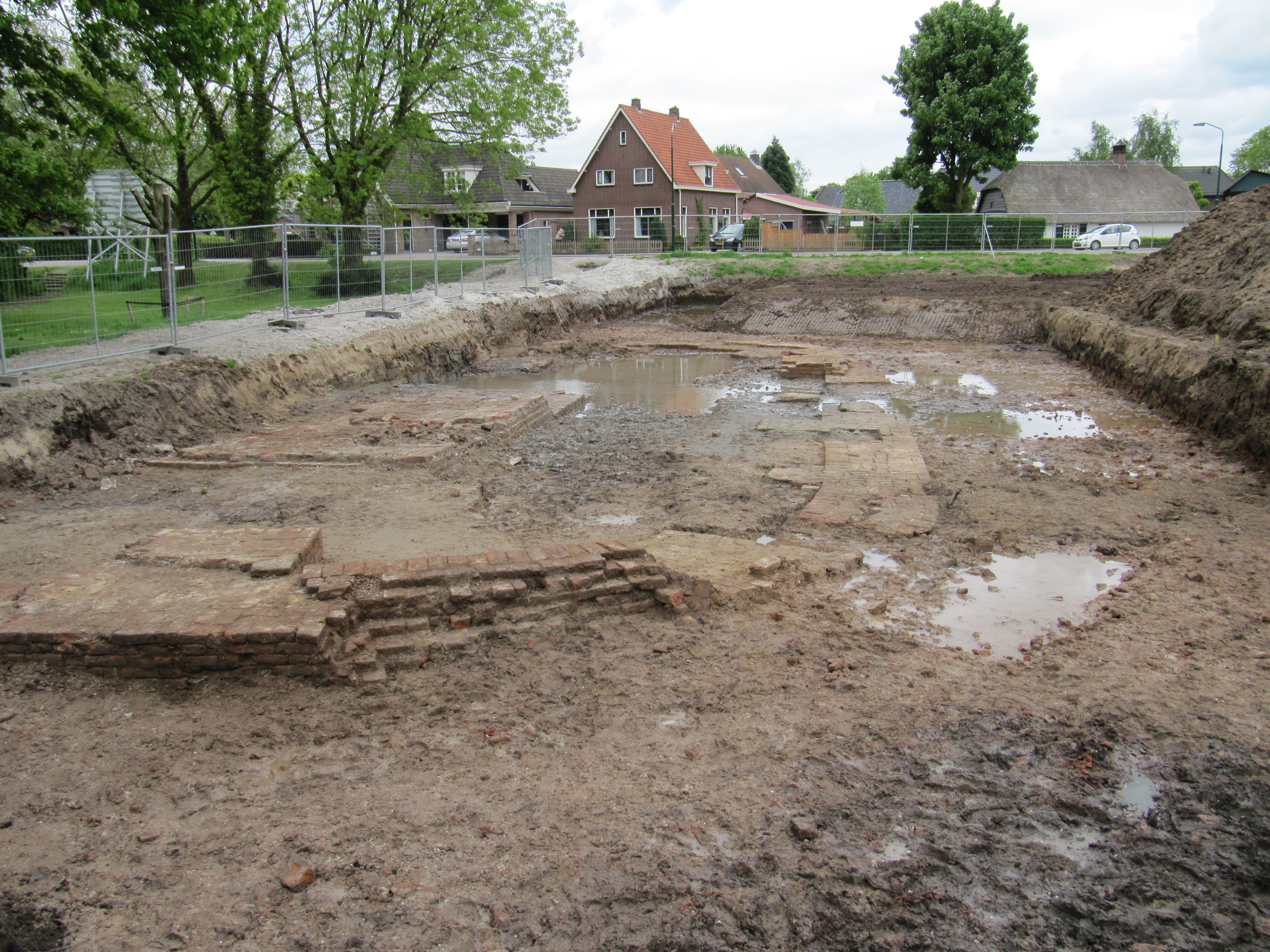
- Excavations Giessen Castle 22 May 2013

Site information
- Type: Castle
- Condition: Foundations have been covered up

Location
- The Netherlands
- Coordinates: 51.791142°N 5.031666°E

Site history
- Built: after 1262
- Materials: brick
- Demolished: c. 1305

Kasteel Giessen was a castle in Giessen, Netherlands. It was rediscovered in 2013, but was not made visible.

== History ==
Giessen Castle was the first known castle of the Lords of Giessen, who were vassals of the Lords of Altena, seated at nearby Altena Castle in Almkerk. A second, later 'house' of the Lords of Giessen, stood to the north, near the small river Alm, and was mentioned in 1364. A third 'house' stood just west of the first, and was first mentioned in 1328. The exact location of these other houses remains unknown.

Giessen Castle was first mentioned in 1296. In that year Arnoud of Giessen was granted his strong house in fief by Willem II of Horne. That is, there is an act dated 5 April 1308. In the act some lords declare that they were present when Arnout of Ghiessen, son of Vastaert of Ghiessen received his Huis te Ghiesenen from Willem of Horne. It is known that after the death of Vastaert, Jan van Cuijk was arbiter to end the conflict between Vastaert and Willem of Horne. In this capacity he decreed that Arnoud had to succeed to the rights of Vastaert. It is likely that this happened immediately after the verdict, i.e. shortly after 29 October 1296.

In the early 1300s the Giessens were again in conflict with the Horne's. At that time, Gerard I of Horne held Giessen Castle as a security from the Count of Guelders. When the count did not respond to Gerard's complaints, Gerard started to demolish the castle in January 1306. The conflict was partly ended by arbitration by the Count of Holland in September 1307. The Van Ghiessens had to pay 2,000 pounds, and Gerard van Horne had to rebuild Giessen Castle. However, nothing came of this rebuild.

In the early 21st century Woudrichem municipality wanted to allow the construction of houses on part of a terrain at Burgstraat (castle street). There were reasons to suppose that the terrain was the same as that referred to as: Hofstede waar het huis Giessen placht te staan (site where the House of Giessen used to be). From 2011 to 2013 preliminary investigations were done. These were done by using ground-penetrating radar. In mid-May 2013 two investigative trenches were dug. One of these trenches found a wall of c. 1.5 m thick. From 15 to 23 May 2013 a more thorough archaeological investigation of the terrain which would be built over, was done by IDDS Archeologie.

It was not a big surprise that remains of a castle were found. However, the archaeologists probably thought of a tower house, and not of a full blown water castle. At the time, the type of castle that was found was only built by the rulers and the (Holland) high nobility. The very high status of the castle is shown by three aspects:

- The rare ring wall
- Presence of import pottery
- Finds of expansive roof tiles with lead coating

== Castle Characteristics ==
=== The castle moats ===
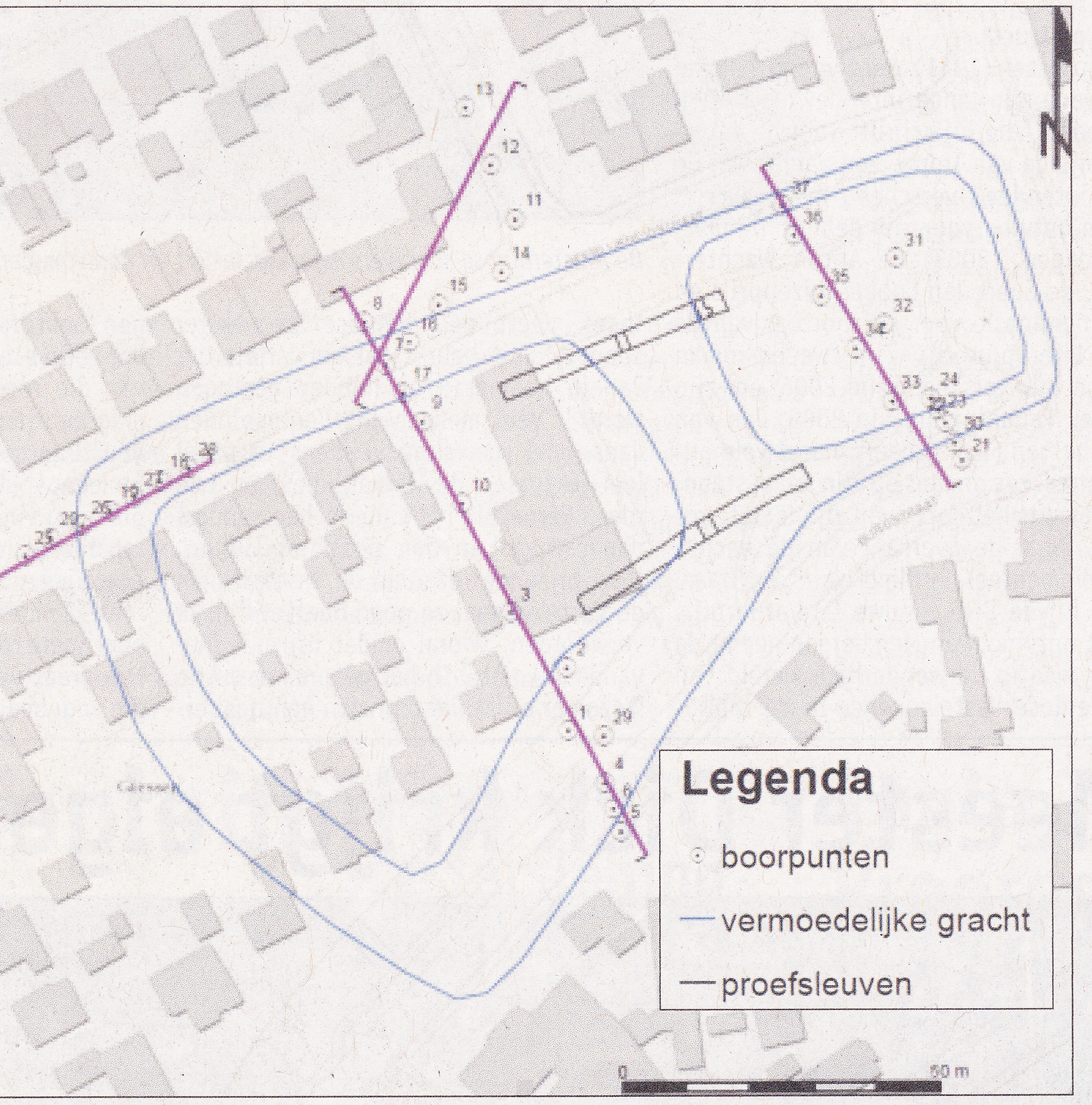
Moats of Giessen Castle

The location of the castle moats was found by use of an earth auger, and by digging the two investigative trenches (see proefsleuven on the map). The outer moat encompassed a terrain of about 4,000 m^{3}. It was 10–20 m wide, and 1.5-1.9 m deep. Inside the moat some artefacts were found. Boiling pottery from the 10th-13th century and 13th century German drinking pottery.

In the excavated area, the moat was between 17.5 and 23 m wide and between 1.60 and 2 m deep. On the inside the main castle itself stood directly in the water. Near the bridge between the main castle and outer bailey, a serious amount of brick debris was found.

=== The outer bailey ===
The outer bailey was 80 m long and 42–69 m wide. It had been built over before the archaeological excavation of 2013. Almost none of it has been investigated.

=== Bridge between castle and outer bailey ===
On the small part of the outer bailey that was investigated, the foundation of a bridge (bridgehead) towards the castle was found. It was of brick framework filled with broken bricks. Most bricks measured 30 * 13.5/14 * 6.5/7 cm. The foundation was made by using mortar, leading to the conclusion that it was built while the water level had been artificially lowered, probably in summer.

Three oak piles belonging to the bridge were recovered. By radiocarbon dating one of these was dated at 1291 +/- 29 years. Making that the bridge and main castle were built in, or after 1262.

About 4.25 m east of the bridgehead, the foundation of a bridge pier was found. It was 3.5 m long and 50 cm wide. Most of it was made of broken bricks. Most of the whole bricks measured 26 * 14 * 6.5 cm. The bridge pier was not part of the first bridge, because the underground was more recent than the moat itself. At 12.5 m east of the bridgehead, a part of what was perhaps the foundation of another bridge pier was found. Perhaps the first bridge was entirely made of wood, while a later version was in part made of stone.

=== The main castle ===
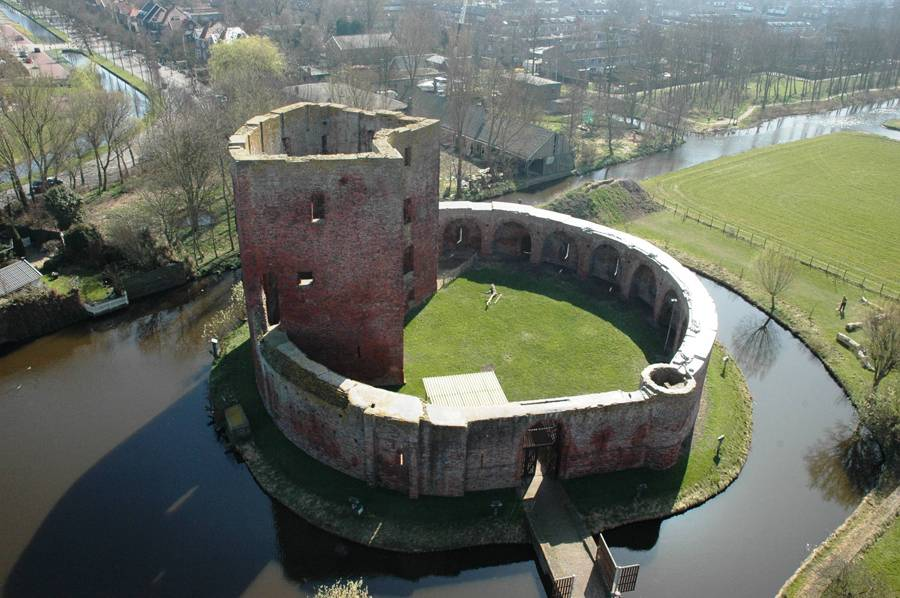
The ring wall might have looked like that of the water castle Teylingen

The most significant part of the castle that was found, was a part of a semi-circular ring wall. Semi-circular meaning that it was square, with rounded off corners. It is estimated that about a third, i.e. the most western part, of this structure was excavated. The total semi-circular structure is estimated to have been 31 m long and 24.25 m wide.

The wall had a thickness of about 1.5 m. Maximum thickness of the wall was 2 m, including the buttresses on the inside, which would have supported arcs with a chemin de ronde on top. Eight of these buttresses were found, i.e. one every 2.5 m. While the top of the remaining wall is at +0.5 m Amsterdam Ordnance Datum (AOD), the bottom of one of the buttresses is at minus 1.21 m AOD. The three lowest layers of brick were simply laid without joining them with mortar, perhaps because the area could not be made dry. Higher up, mortar was used. Most of the bricks measured 30 * 14 * 7 cm. The original height of the wall is estimated at 5–6 m high.

In the center of the main castle, an L-shaped piece of a foundation of 8.5 m long and 2.2 m wide was found. The remaining foundation is 90 cm high, and consists of bricks that measure 30 * 15 * 6 cm. A possible and likely structure to have stood at this place is an 8.5 by 8.5 m square or rectangular tower house, of maximum about 13 m high with three floors.

=== A tower outside the main castle ===
The results of the ground-penetrating radar investigation show that on the outside of the southeast corner, there was a construction that was most probably a tower house of about 9 by 9 m, with an annex of 6 by 8 m.

=== Classification of Giessen Castle ===
The authors of the archaeological report about Giessen Castle have tried to classify it as a known subtype of castle, but this was not possible. Giessen Castle was not a Motte-and-bailey castle, because no hill was constructed. For a water castle the thickness of the ring wall (2.0 m) at Giessen is exactly in line with the average for round castles. However, the size of Giessen Castle is smaller than average for a round castle: 31 * 24 m against an average cross-section of 35–45 m.

Compared to Teylingen Castle and Haamstede Castle all buildings are inside the main wall at these castles, while at Giessen there are structures outside the ring wall. In this respect Giessen resembles Wouw Castle. On the interior Giessen Castle also looks more like Wouw Castle, instead of resembling Teylingen and Haamstede, where all buildings were attached to the outer wall. The semi-circular form of the ring wall of Giessen resembles that of Haamstede. The size makes it fit with the polygonal castles (30-40 m), but it lacks more than 4 sides. On the other hand, Giessen does not belong to the square castles, because of its rounded of corners, and the lack of corner towers. Based on what was known so far, the authors concluded that Giessen Castle seems to have been a transitional type of castle between the circular and square water castle.

== The castle today ==
After the archaeological excavation, the remains of the castle were covered up again, and houses were built. In July 2018 a monument was placed to mark the location of the former castle.
