= Nederhemert =

- Village
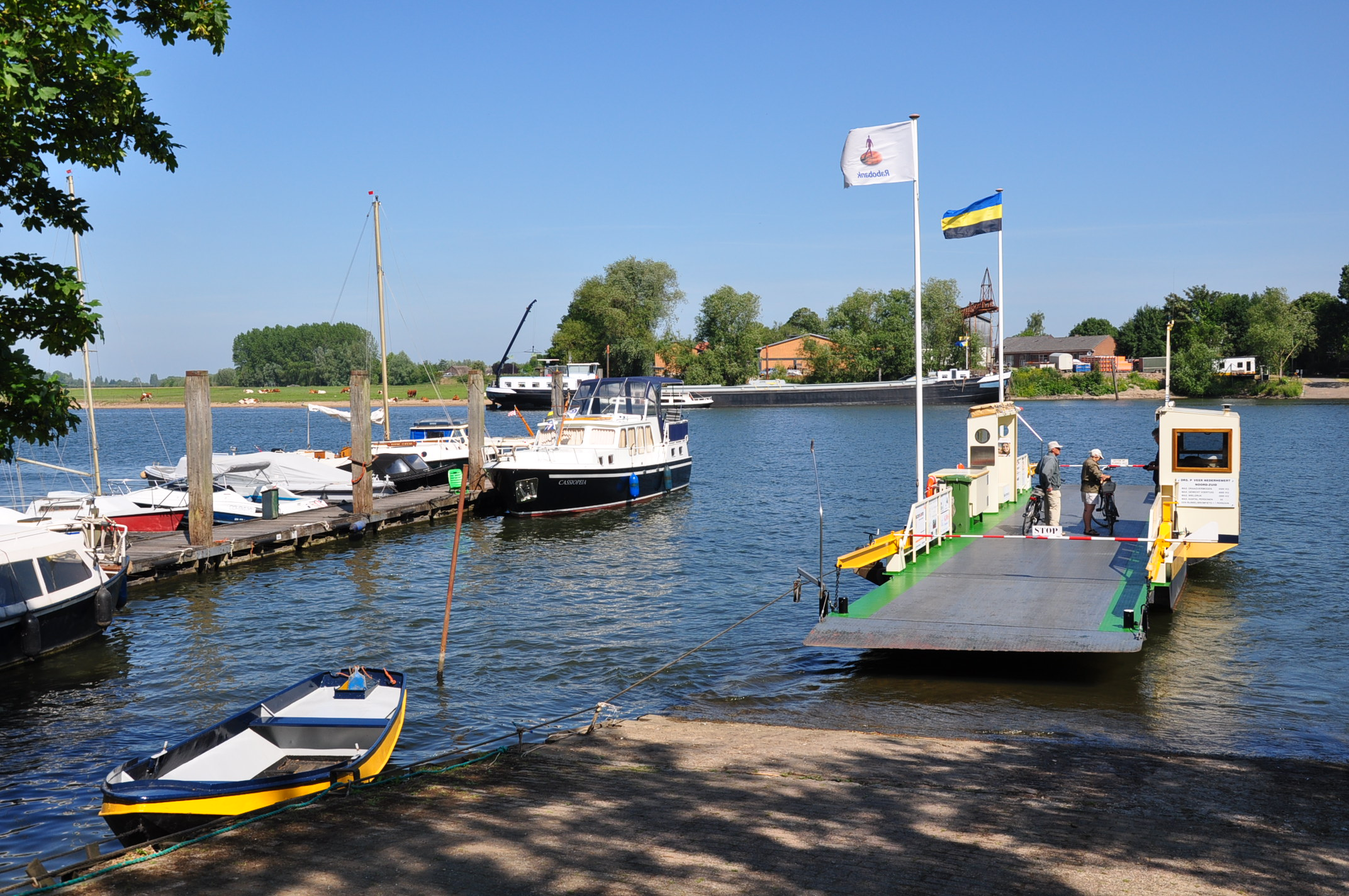
- Harbour and ferry

- Coat of arms

- Location in the Netherlands Nederhemert (Netherlands)
- Coordinates: 51°45′46″N 5°9′42″E
- Country: Netherlands
- Province: Gelderland
- Municipality: Zaltbommel

Area
  - Total: 10.00 km^{2} (3.86 sq mi)
- Elevation: 2 m (6.6 ft)

Population (2021)
  - Total: 1,765
  - Density: 176.5/km^{2} (457.1/sq mi)
- Time zone: UTC+1 (CET)
  - Summer (DST): UTC+2 (CEST)
- Postal code: 5317
- Dialing code: 0418

Nederhemert is a village in the Dutch province of Gelderland. It is a part of the municipality of Zaltbommel, and lies about 8 km southwest of that city. Nederhemert was a separate municipality until 1955, when it was merged with Kerkwijk.

Nederhemert consists of two parts. The largest part is Nederhemert-Noord. The smaller village of Nederhemert-Zuid, with only about 25 inhabitants, lies south of the Afgedamde Maas.

== History ==
It was first mentioned in 1144 as Hemmerte. Neder (lower) has been added to distinguish from Ophemert (upper). Hemert means rock or stone. In 1480, the Afgedamde Maas was dug which resulted in a split into two parts. The southern part has become a river island in 1904 due to the construction of the Heusden Canal and the Bergse Maas.

Castle Nederhemert was built in the southern part around 1300. In the second quarter of 14th century, walls with corner towers were added. A little redoubt was added in 1589. The castle burned down in 1945, and is now a ruin. The Protestant Church of the northern part dates from 1776. The tower of the southern church dated from the 14th century and the church from 1633. The church was destroyed in 1944, and rebuilt around 1955.

In 1840, the northern part was home to 426 people and the southern part to 159. Since 1904, the southern part shares the river island with Bern, however they have remained separate villages.

The grist mill Gebr. Remmerde was probably built in 1716 and was a possession of Castle Nederhemert. Between 1978 and 1979, the wind mill was restored, but is no longer in operation.

== Gallery ==
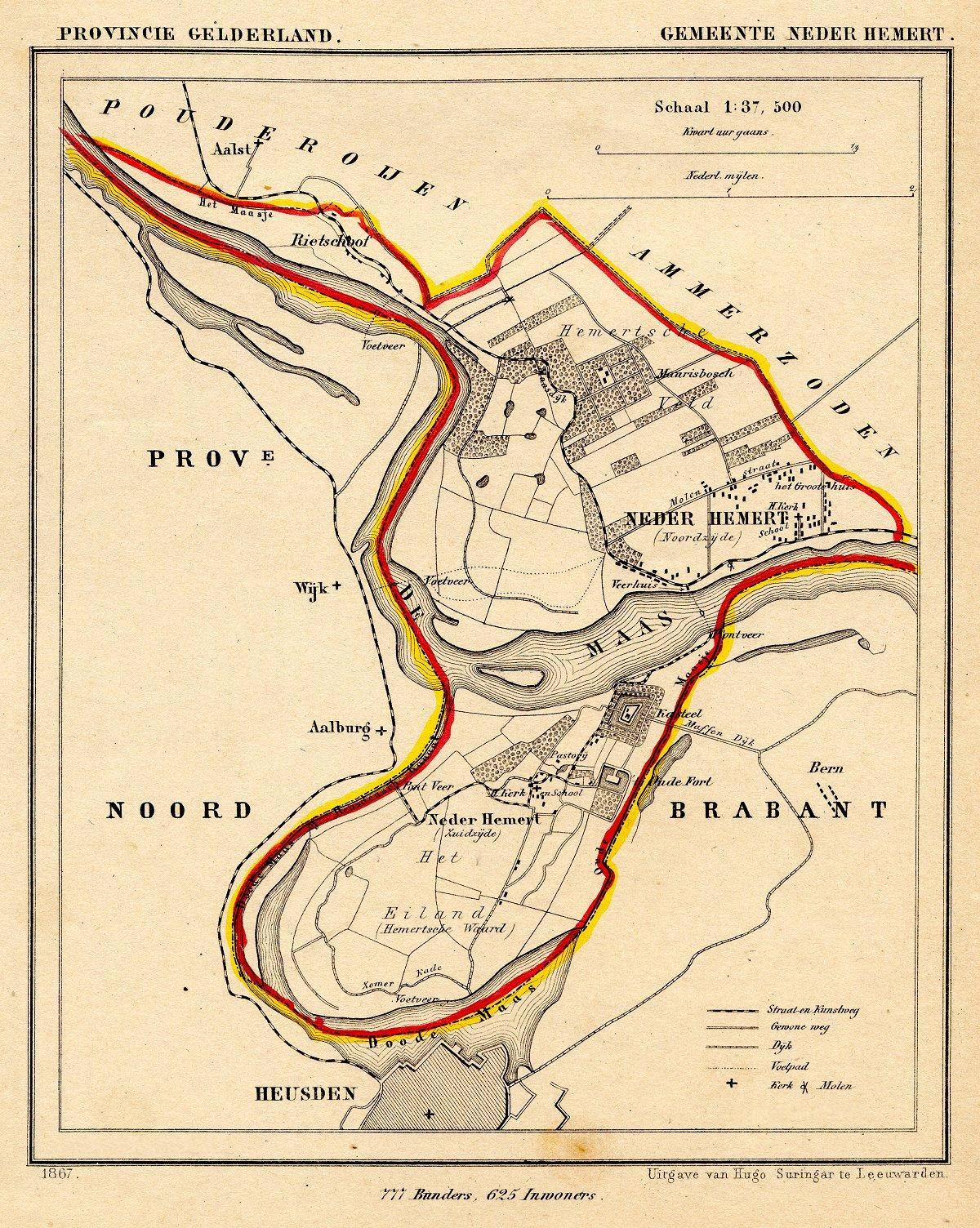
The municipality of Nederhemert in 1867

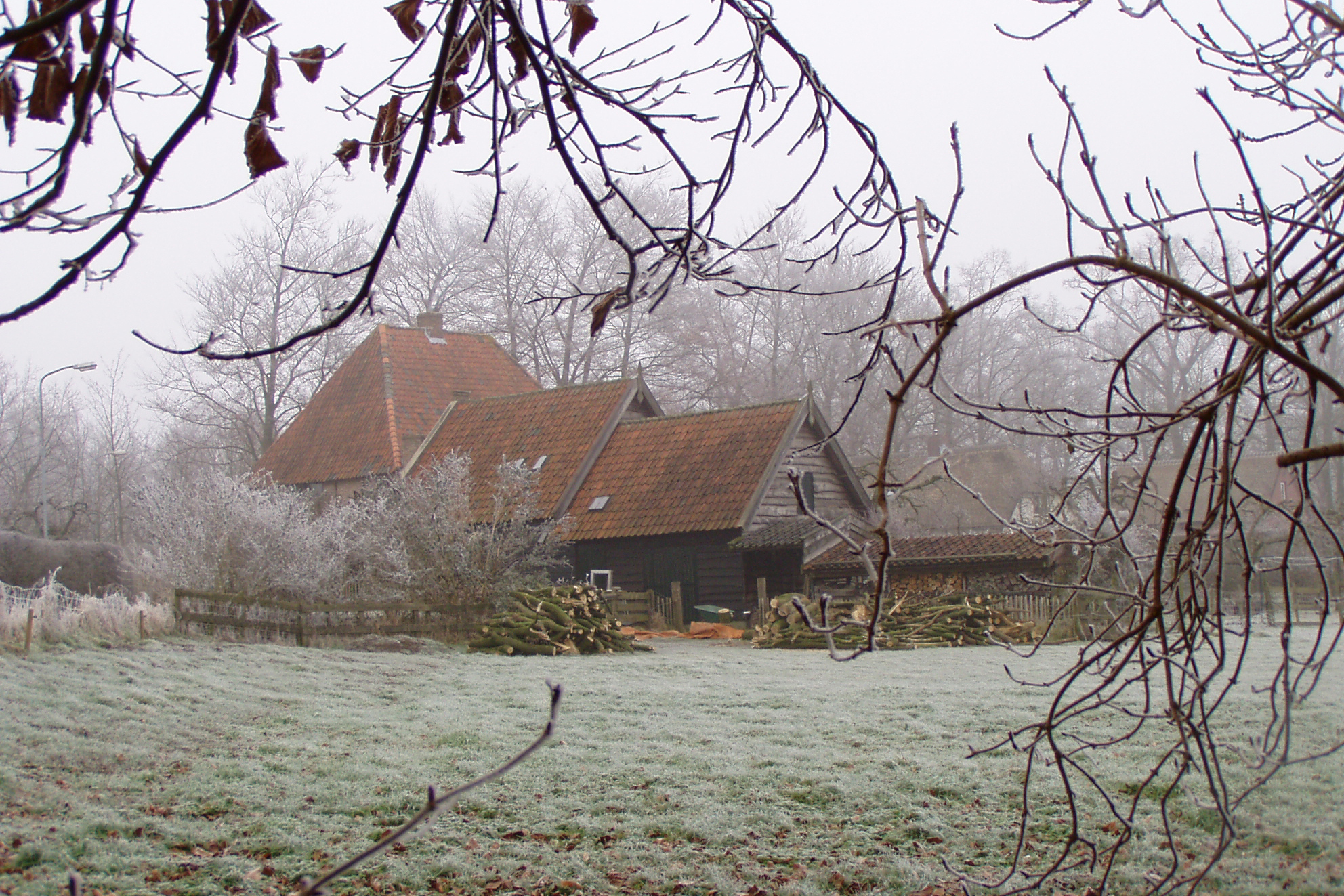
Farm in Nederhemert-Zuid

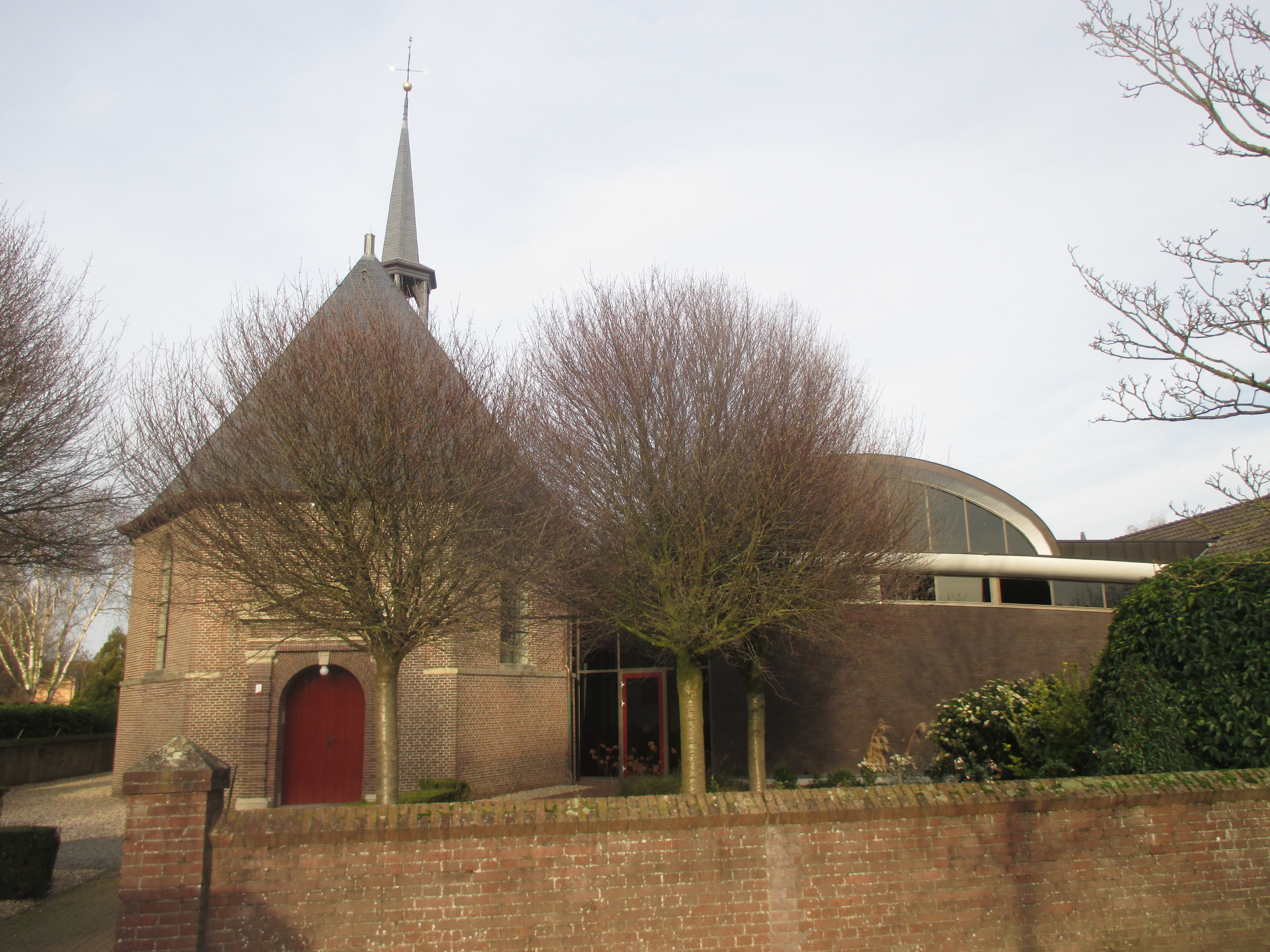
Protestant Church (North)

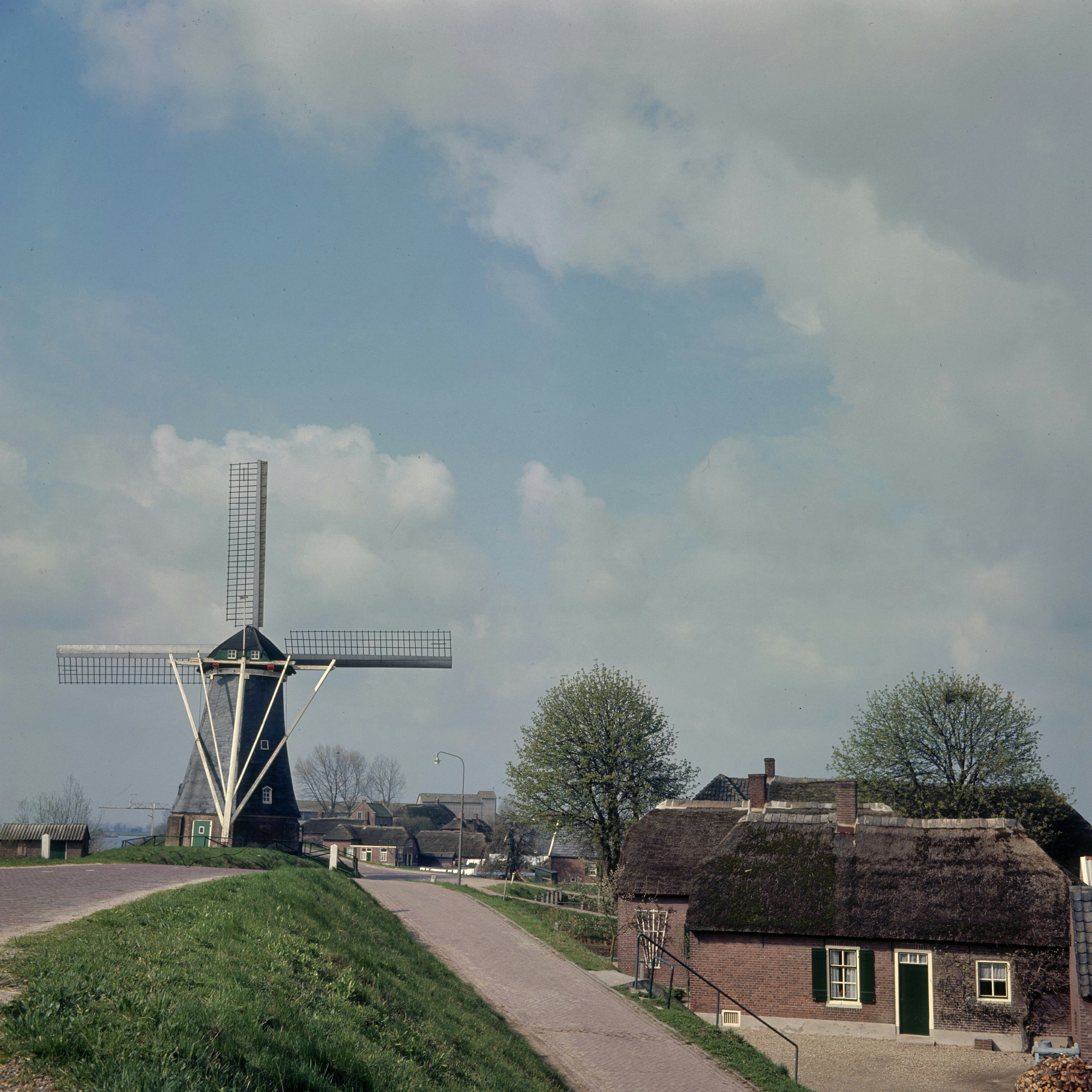
Windmill Gebr. Remmerde
