= Louwrens Hanedoes =

Dutch painter

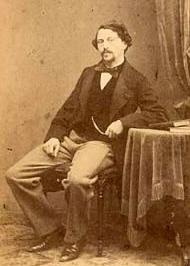
Louwrens Hanedoes (c.1860)

Louwrens Hanedoes (14 July 1822, Woudrichem - 9 February 1905, Woudrichem) was a Dutch landscape painter; in the Romantic style at first, later turning to Realism.

== Biography ==
From 1839 to 1840, he studied at the Royal Academy of Art with Cornelis Kruseman and Barend Cornelis Koekkoek, who was especially influential on his style. From the beginning, he preferred landscapes, travelling to mountainous areas such as the Pyrenees, Switzerland and the Eifel. His favorite spots in the Netherlands were Arnhem and Oosterbeek.

Shortly after 1850, he became one of the first Dutch painters to visit Barbizon, where he was strongly influenced by the Barbizon school of artists and changed to a more realistic style of painting. Many critics consider his work to be a precursor to the Hague School.

In 1863, he was named a Ridder in the Order of Leopold. After that point, his productivity declined and he eventually retired to his family estate in Woudrichem, where he died in 1905. Streets were named after him in Benoordenhout and Eindhoven.
