= Eista Werf =

- Industry: Shipbuilding
- Headquarters: The Netherlands
- Key people: Dick Lefeber (designer)

The Eista Werf was a boat building company in The Netherlands. Boats were built at its shipyard between the years 1959 and 1981, including the Doerak motoryacht, the Banjer motorsailer, the Rogger motorsailer and the Krammer motorsailer. Overseas sales of boats produced by the shipyard were handled by Intermarine, Stangate Marine and Impex Enterprises (Thomas Tirion-Reading, PA). The designer of all Eista Werf boats was Dick Lefeber.

Owners of EISTA boats have started clubs. Each club has its own website: the Doerakclub , the Rogger Motorsailer Club , the Banjer Motorsailer Club and the Krammer Motorsailer Club
