= Heusden Canal =

Coordinates: 51°44′54″N 5°8′0″E

Heusden Canal (Heusdensch Kanaal)
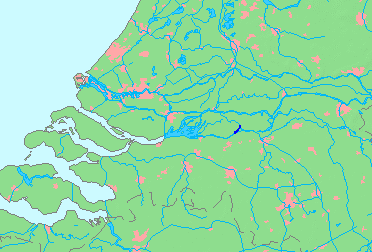

Location
- Country: Netherlands
- Provinces: Gelderland, North Brabant
- Municipalities: Altena, Zaltbommel

Physical characteristics
- Source
  - location: Afgedamde Maas
- Mouth
  - location: Bergsche Maas
- Length: 2.3 km (1.4 mi)

Basin features
- River system: Maas

The Heusden Canal (Dutch: Heusdensch Kanaal) is a canal on the border of the Dutch provinces North Brabant and Gelderland, roughly between Wijk en Aalburg and Heusden. The canal connects the Afgedamde Maas and Bergse Maas and has a total length of approximately 2.3 km. The canal used to connect the city of Heusden to the main branch of the river Meuse. Later on, the original main branch was closed off (Afgedamde Maas) and the river received a new, artificial mouth: the Bergse Maas. After that, the Heusden Canal was improved to maintain a shipping connection between the two Meuse branches.

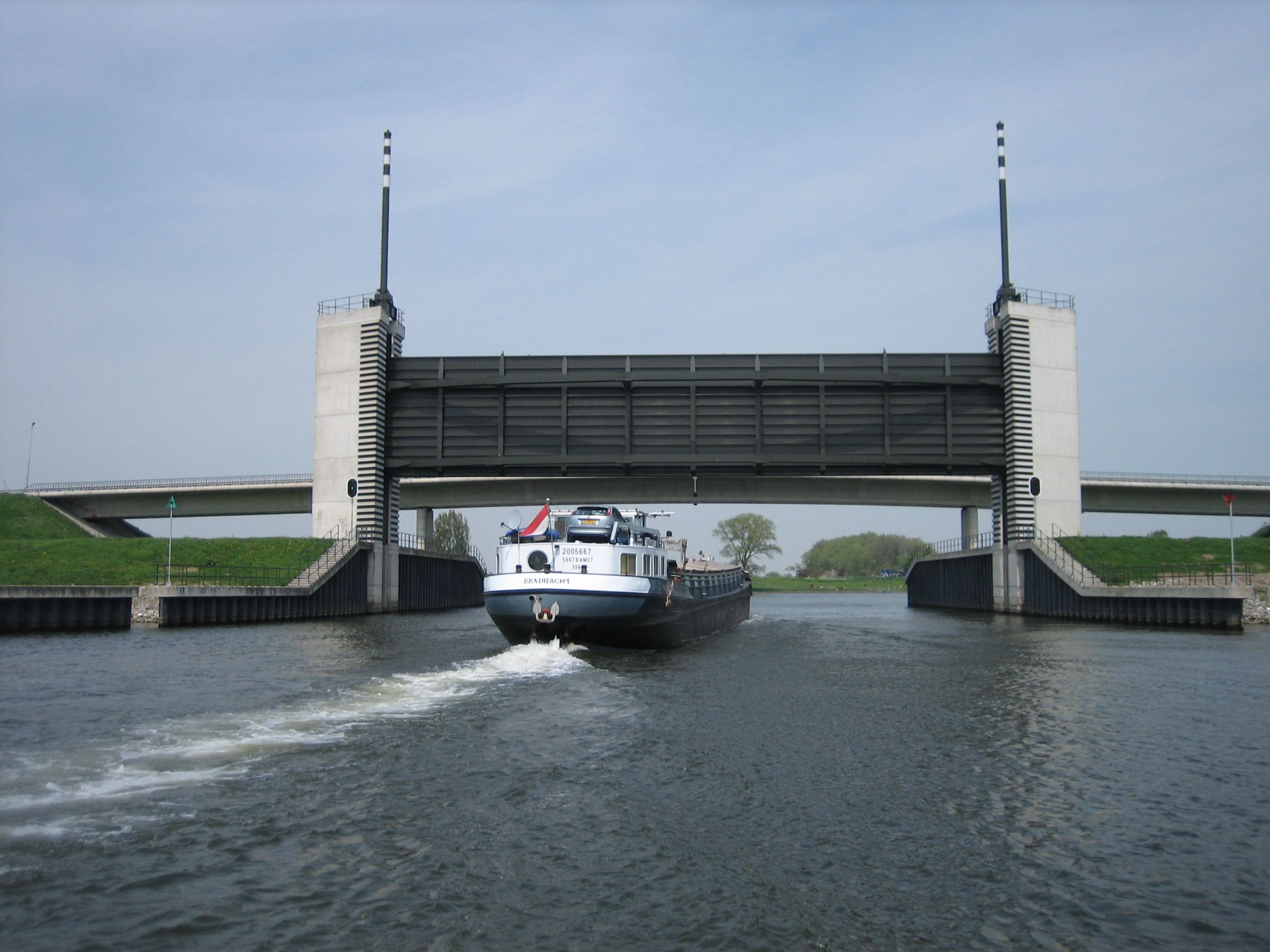
The "Kromme Nol" lock

On the Bergsche Maas end, there is a lock named the Kromme Nolkering, and also the only bridge across the canal; it is part of the N831.

The improvement of the canal was required under the Maasmondwet ("Maas Mouth Act") of 26 January 26, 1883.
