= Woudrichem =

- City and former municipality
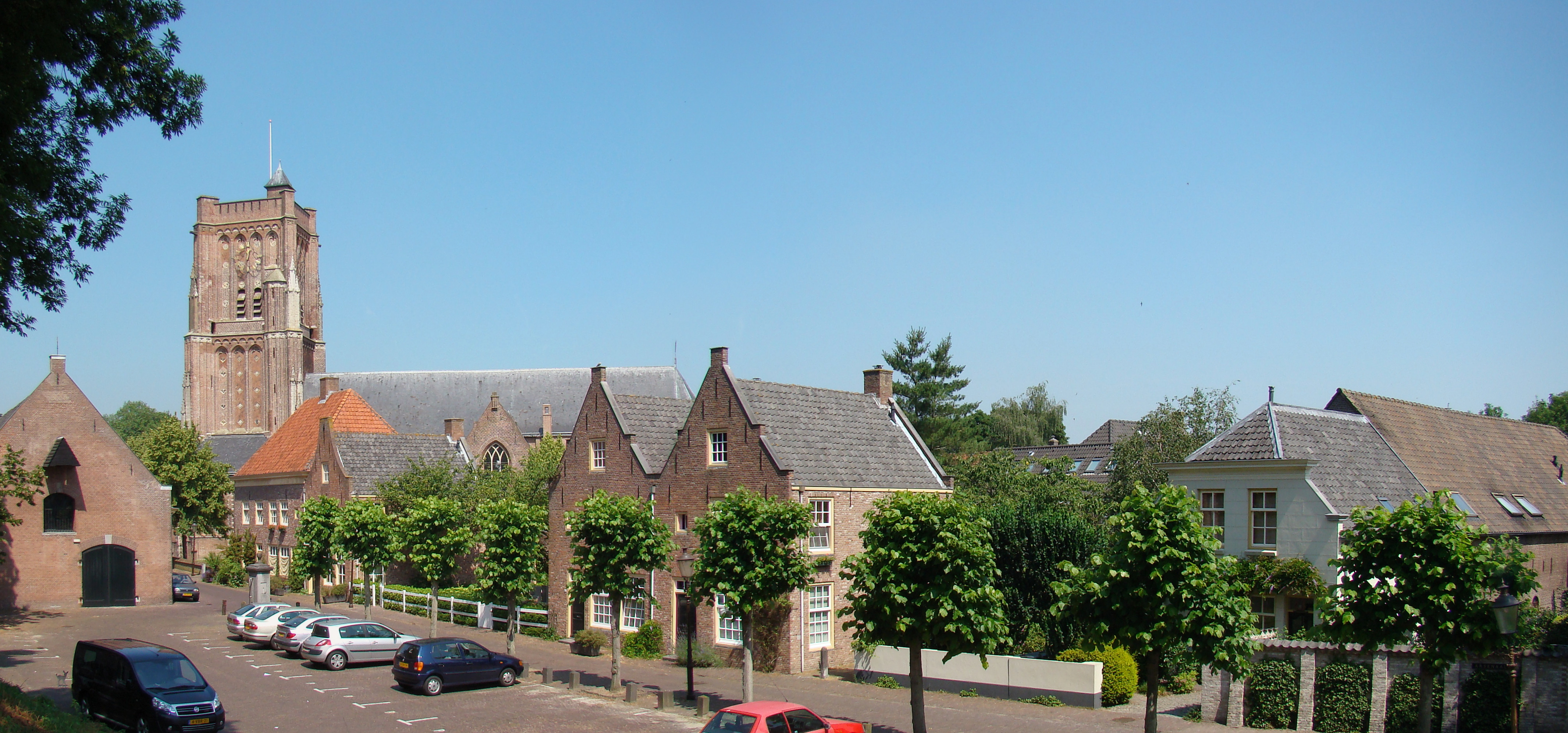
- Martin Church and houses in 2015

- Flag Coat of arms

- Location in the province of North Brabant in the Netherlands Woudrichem (Netherlands)
- Coordinates: 51°49′N 5°0′E
- Country: Netherlands
- Province: North Brabant
- Municipality: Altena
- Merged: 2019

Area
  - Total: 7.55 km^{2} (2.92 sq mi)
- Elevation: 0 m (0 ft)

Population (2024)
  - Total: 4.620
- Demonym: Woudrichemmer
- Time zone: UTC+1 (CET)
  - Summer (DST): UTC+2 (CEST)
- Postcode: 4285
- Area code: 0183
- Website: www.woudrichem.nl

Woudrichem (Dutch pronunciation: [ˈʋʌudriɣəm]; Brabantian: Woerkum) is a city and former municipality in the province of North Brabant in the Netherlands.

== History ==
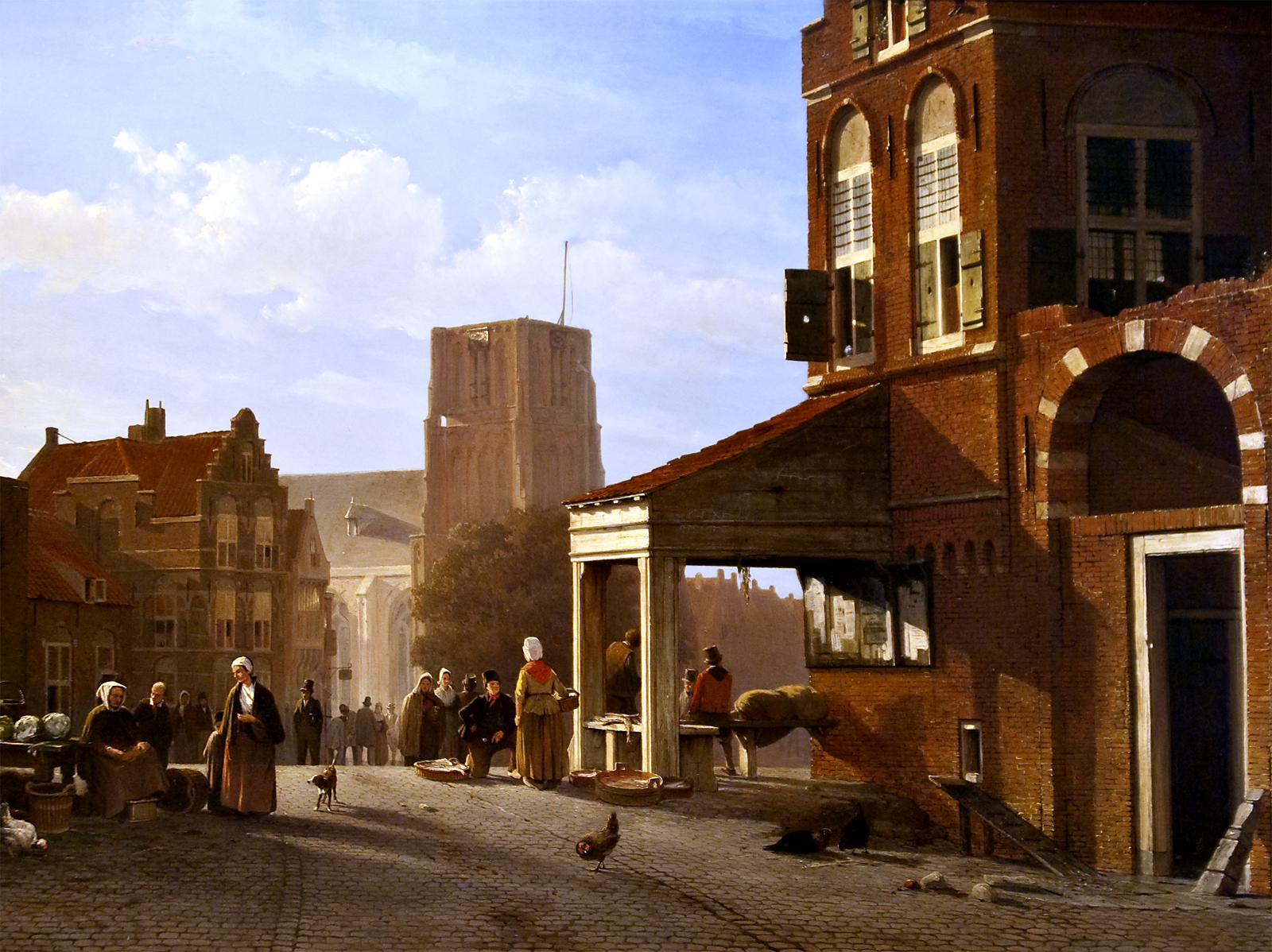
The Fish Market of Woudrichem (c. 1850) by Jan Weissenbruch

Woudrichem originated in the ninth century. A marketplace emerged on a riverbank where Hoogstraat and Molenstraat are now located. Around the year 1000, several settlements, mostly north of the Alm, appeared and were centered around Woudrichem. Initially, the Maas did not flow past Woudrichem. The main course of this river first flowed approximately through the bed of the current Bergsche Maas; later, the Alm was the main course, and later still, the current Afgedamde Maas, until the Bergsche Maas was dug in 1904.

Woudrichem was strategically located at the confluence of the Maas and Waal rivers, within the spheres of influence of the Duchy of Brabant, Gelre, and the County of Holland. In 1322, the Land of Altena was incorporated into the County of Holland, only to be assigned to the newly formed province of North Brabant in 1815.

In the fourteenth century, the town had grown so much that the Lord of Altena, Willem VII van Horne, granted city rights to Woudrichem in 1356. In the same year, the Count of Holland moved the comital river toll from Niemandsvriend, located in Sliedrecht, to Woudrichem. As a result, and due to other privileges such as the fishing rights granted in 1362 by Dirk Loef of Horne, the builder of Loevestein Castle, the town flourished.

During this time, the Martin church was also built. In 1386, construction of the city wall began. It was in this year that the Count of Holland annexed the Land of Altena. Negotiations between John IV of Brabant and John VI of Bavaria led to the Treaty of Woudrichem (1419). After this, the economy began to decline when the toll was moved to Gorinchem in 1420 and the Saint Elizabeth's flood caused devastation in 1421. The situation further deteriorated, partly due to military activities.

Due to its strategic location, Woudrichem was frequently besieged. The city was attacked by the Arkels in 1405 and by the Gelders in 1511. In 1572, Woudrichem sided with William of Orange. In 1573, the Geuzen deemed the city indefensible and set it on fire.

Between 1583 and 1588, a fortification belt was built around the city, although it enclosed a smaller area than the former city wall. The fortification was designed by Adriaen Antonisz. van Alkmaar. With the help of surrounding cities, the town was rebuilt. Nevertheless, the economic situation remained poor, and in 1700, Woudrichem was granted tax exemption.

In 2006, Woudrichem celebrated '650 years of city rights.' Residents dressed in historical costumes and performed various scenes from past centuries over a weekend in August.

== Naming ==
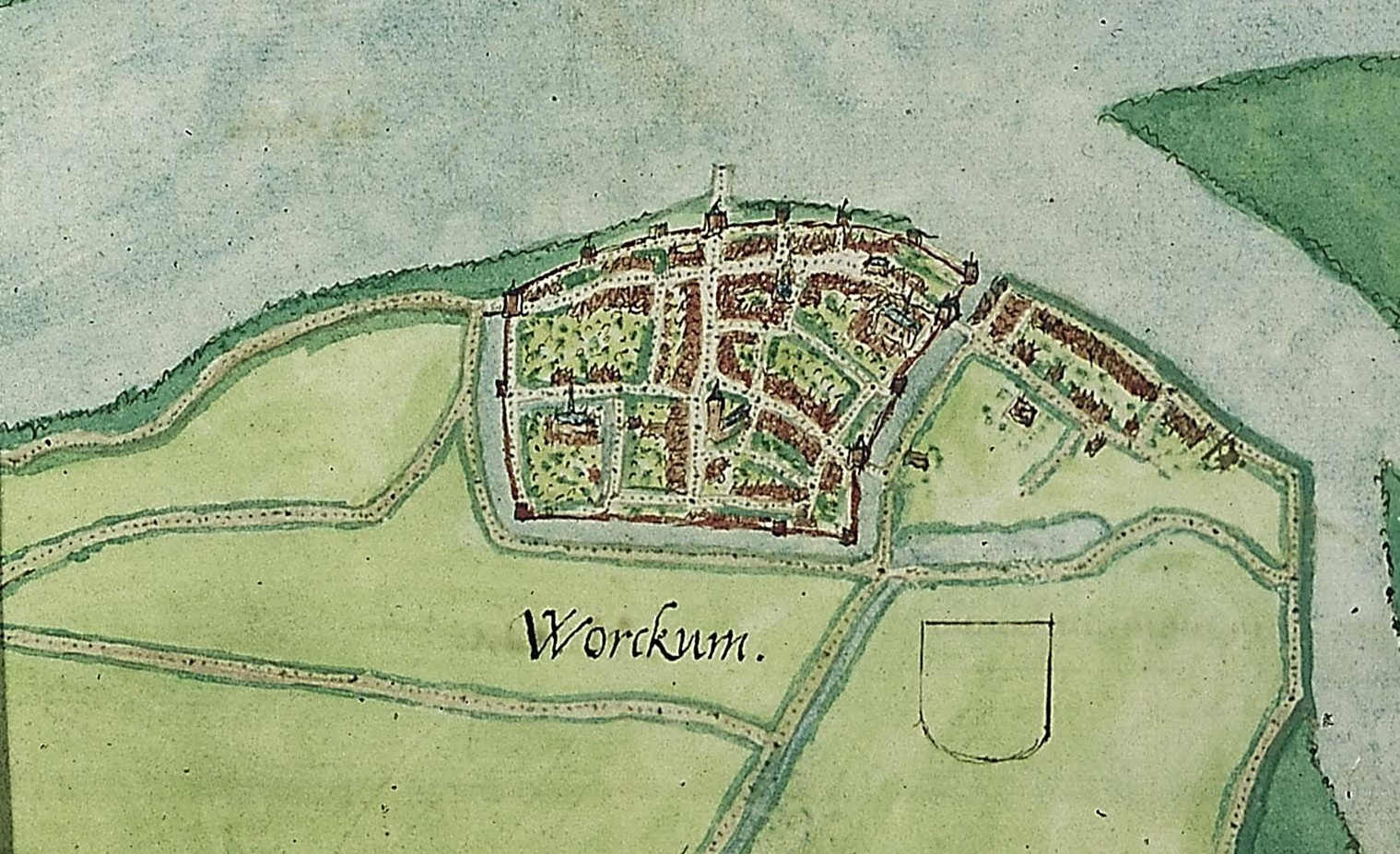
Oldest known map of Woudrichem (1545)

There are several explanations for the origin of the name Woudrichem. The first and most likely explanation suggests that the place name comes from 'wald' and 'heim,' indicating a wooded area. A second explanation is that a Lord Waldrik built a house on the bank of the Waal. Over time, Woudrichem has been pronounced and written in various ways. Several variants have been displayed on the facade of a building on Kerkstraat in Woudrichem. Some of these variants are as follows:

- ca. 866 UUalricheshem
- ca. 1000 Walderinghem
- 1178 Waldrichem
- 1230 Woudrichemerward
- 1241 Wodrinheim / Wodrincheym / Wodrinchem
- 1465 Woldrichem
- 1476 Woerchem
- 1500 Worrynckhem / Worrynhem
- 1536 Worcum / Worcom
- 1600 Worichem
- 1724 Wornichem

In the region, people now usually say Woerkum or Woerkem.

== Geography ==
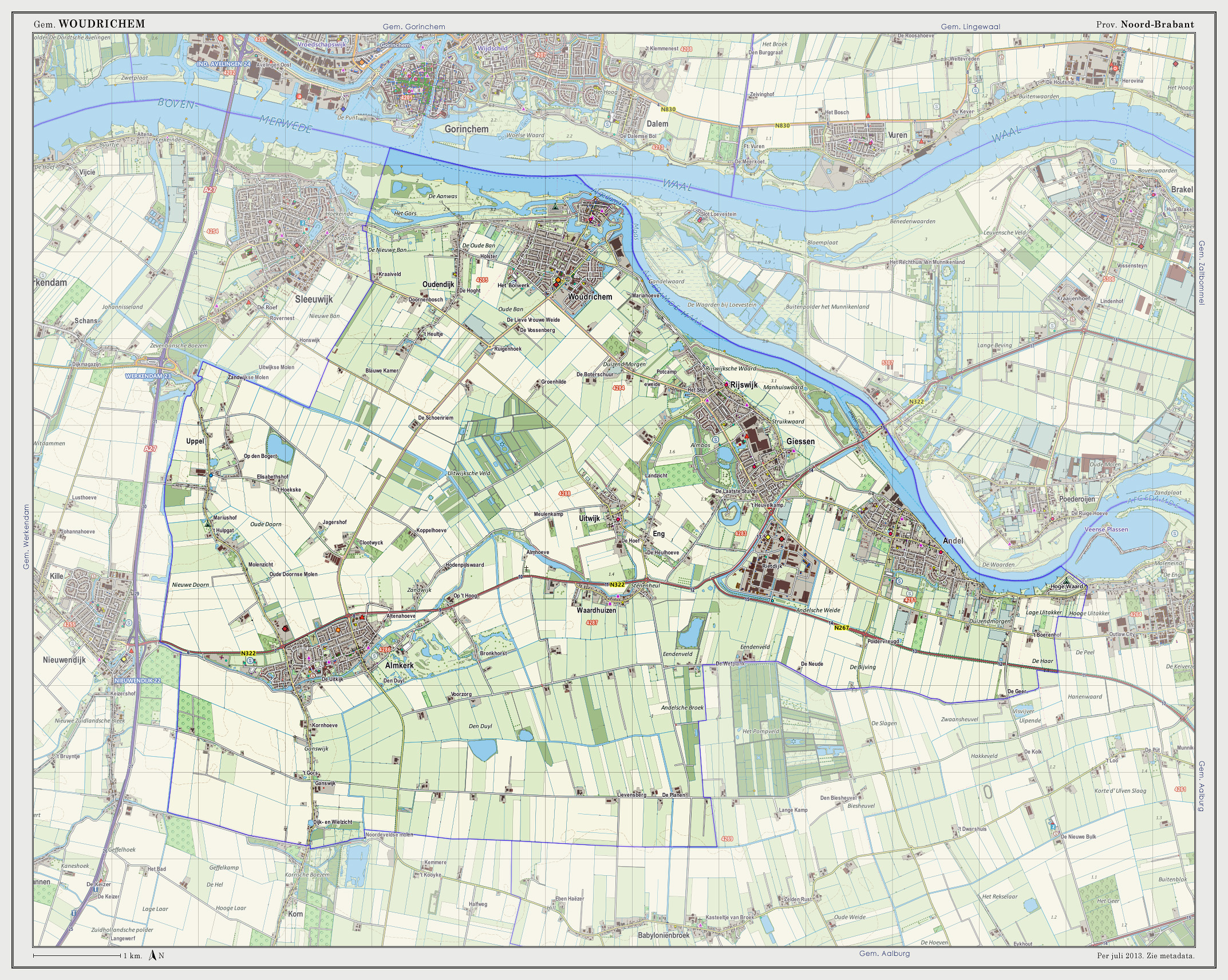
2013 map of the municipality

The municipality is located at 51°49′N 5°0′E in the north of North Brabant just south of the center of the Netherlands. It is part of the region of Land van Heusden en Altena.

The city of Woudrichem is the largest settlement in the municipality. It is situated on the south bank of where the rivers Waal and Afgedamde Maas join to form the Boven Merwede. The other population centres in the municipality were:

- Almkerk
- Andel
- Bronkhorst
- Duizend Morgen
- Eng
- Giessen
- Oudendijk
- Rijswijk
- Stenenheul
- Uitwijk
- Uppel
- Waardhuizen
- Zandwijk

East of the city lies Loevestein Castle, on the other side of the river in the province of Gelderland.

== Gallery ==
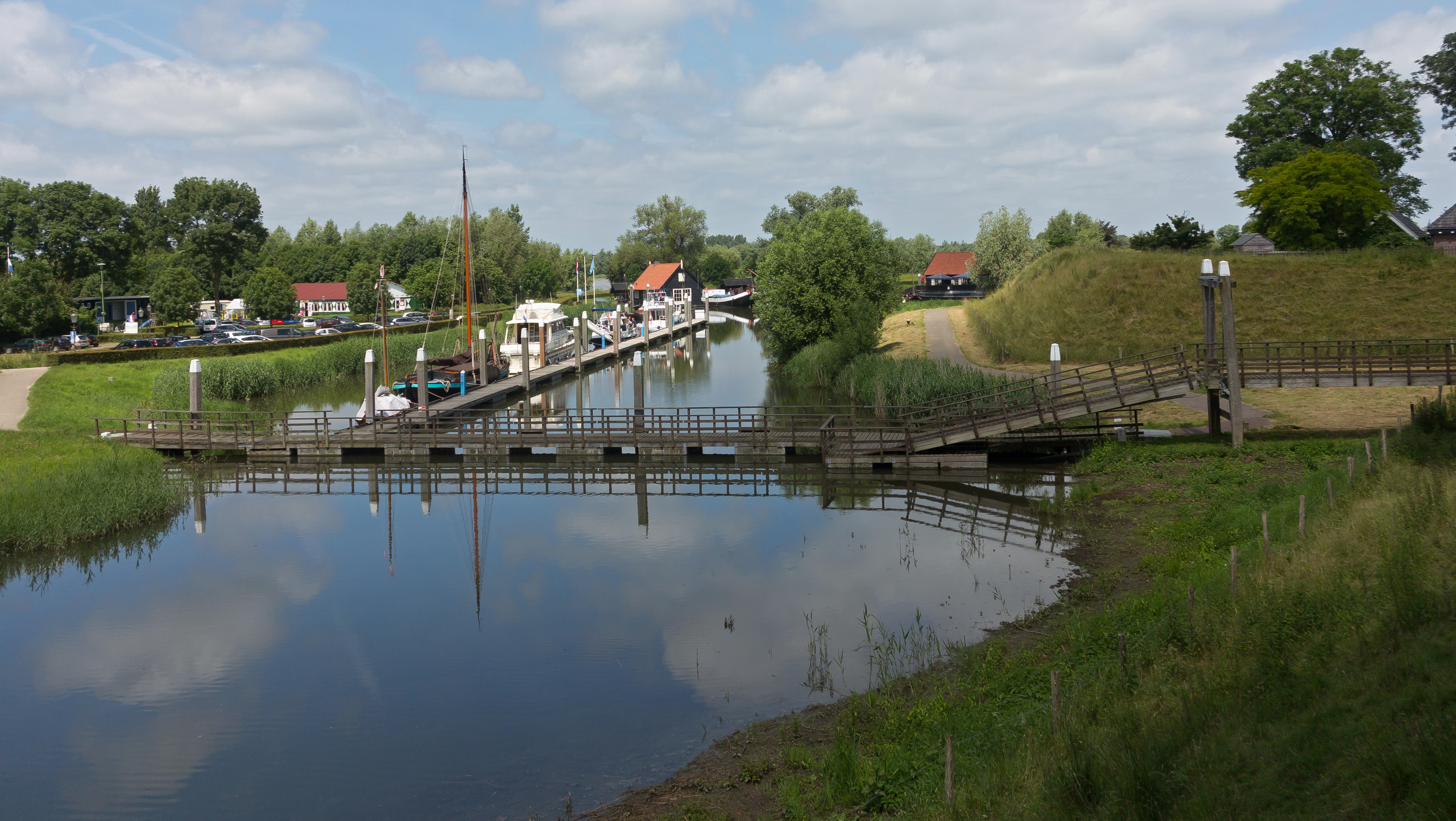
Historical port in Woudrichem

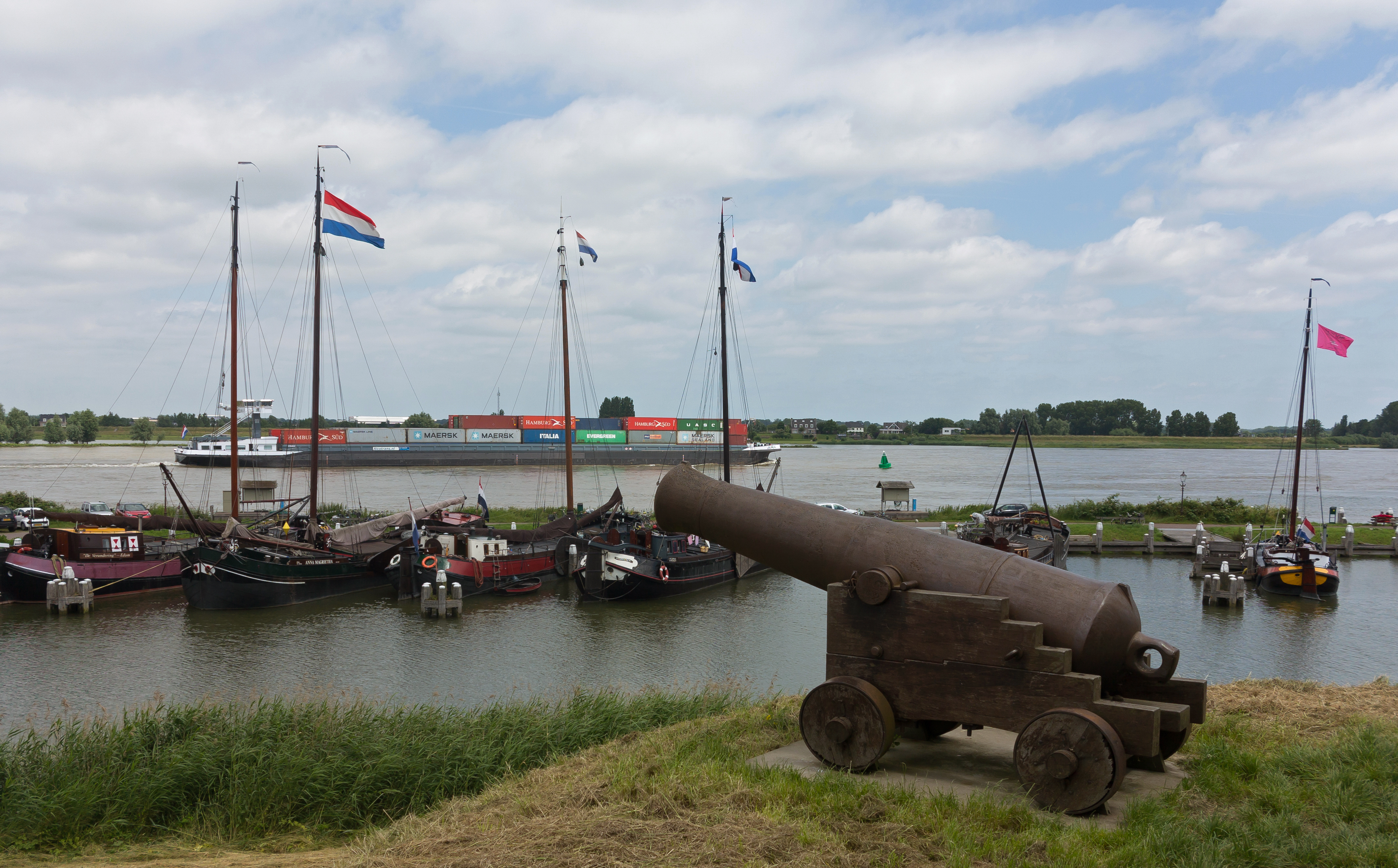
Historical port in Woudrichem

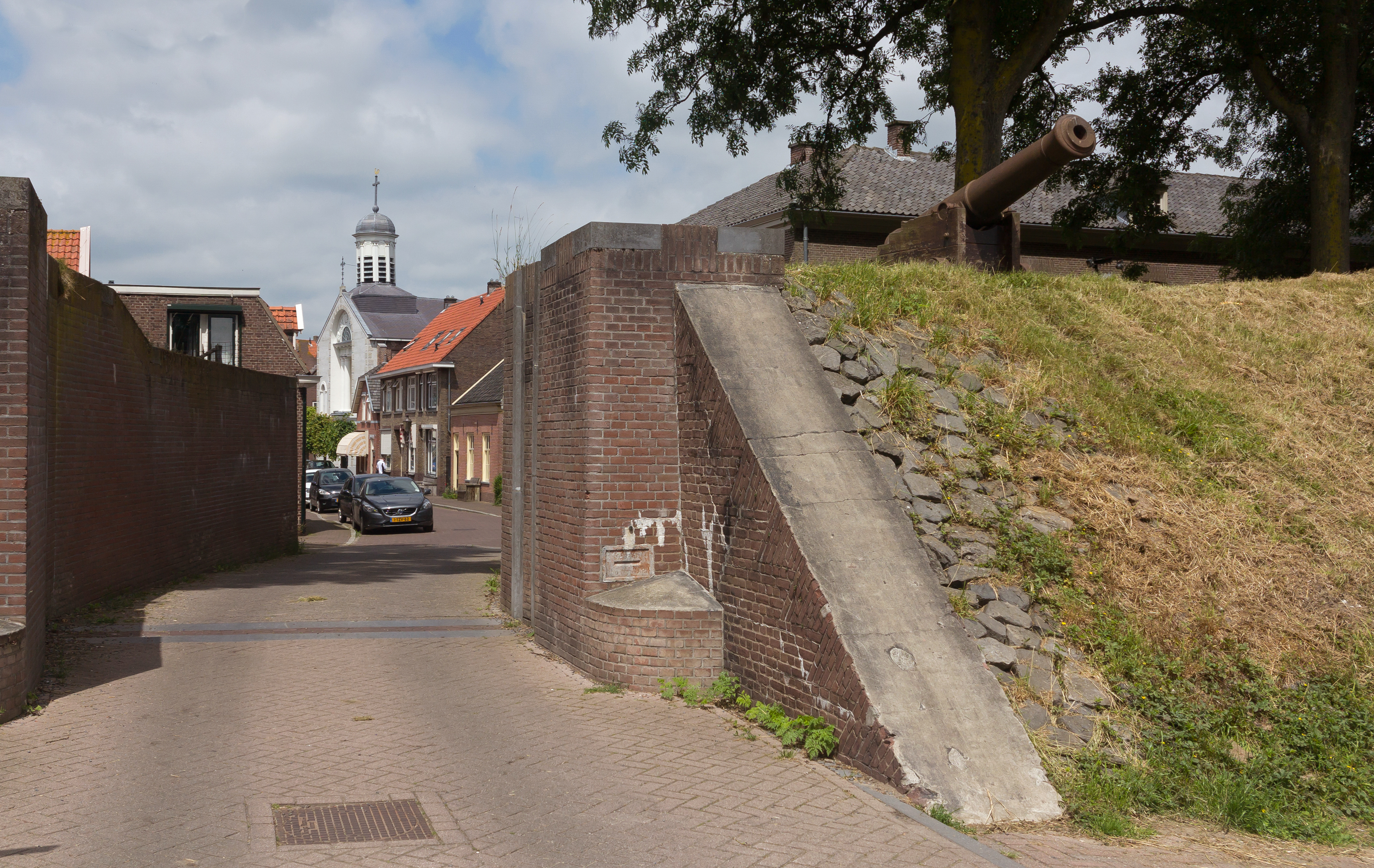
Street view in Woudrichem

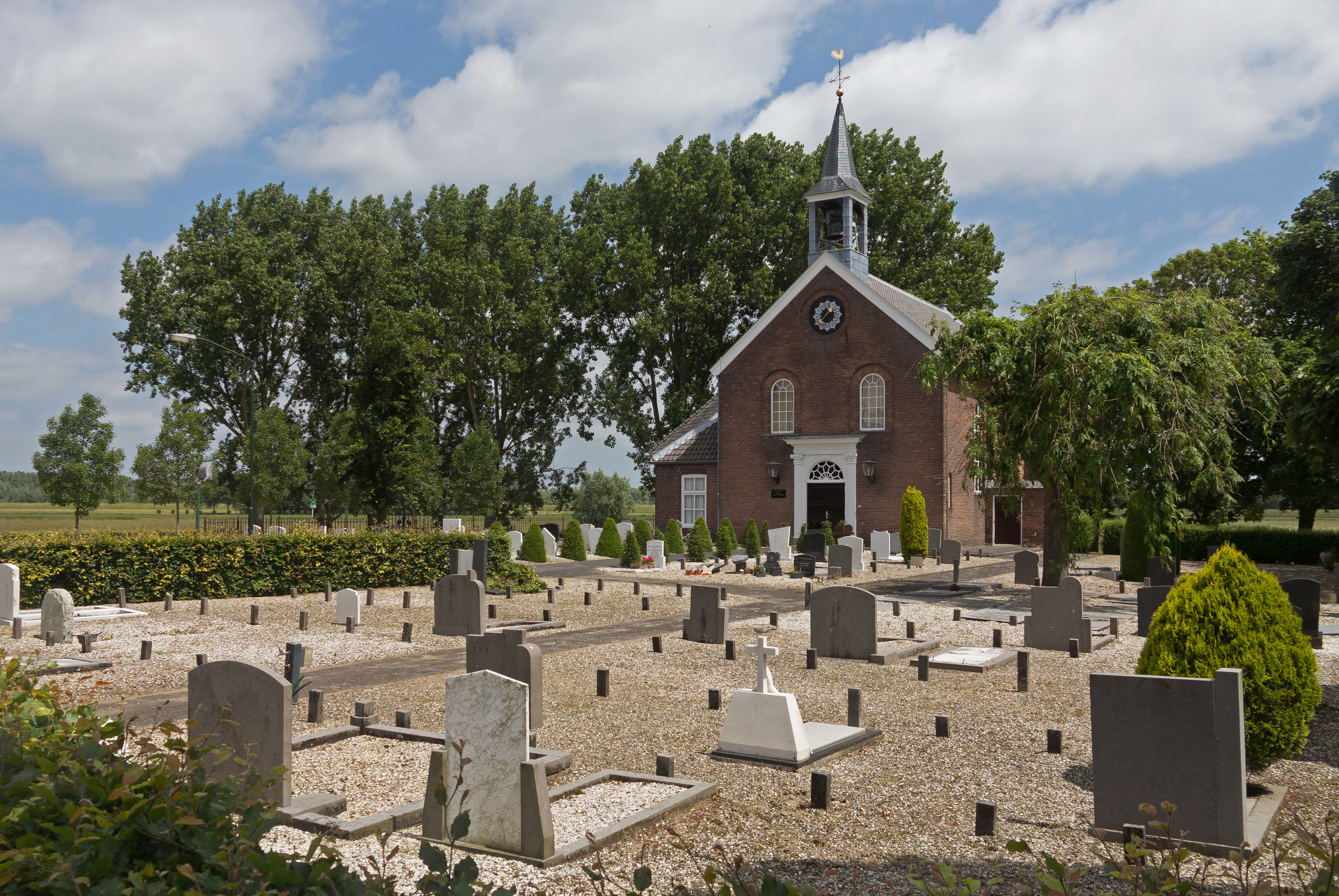
Reformed church in Giessen

Annual Fish Baking Championship on Ascension Day

== Government ==
The municipal council of Woudrichem had 15 members. The mayor was Arie Noordergraaf of the Reformed Political Party. On January 1sth 2019 it joined Werkendam and Aalburg in the new municipality of Altena.

== Notable people ==
- Louwrens Hanedoes (1822 in Woudrichem – 1905 in Woudrichem) landscape painter; in the Romantic style, later turning to Realism.
