= Afgedamde Maas =

River in the Netherlands

Coordinates: 51°49′10″N 05°00′14″E

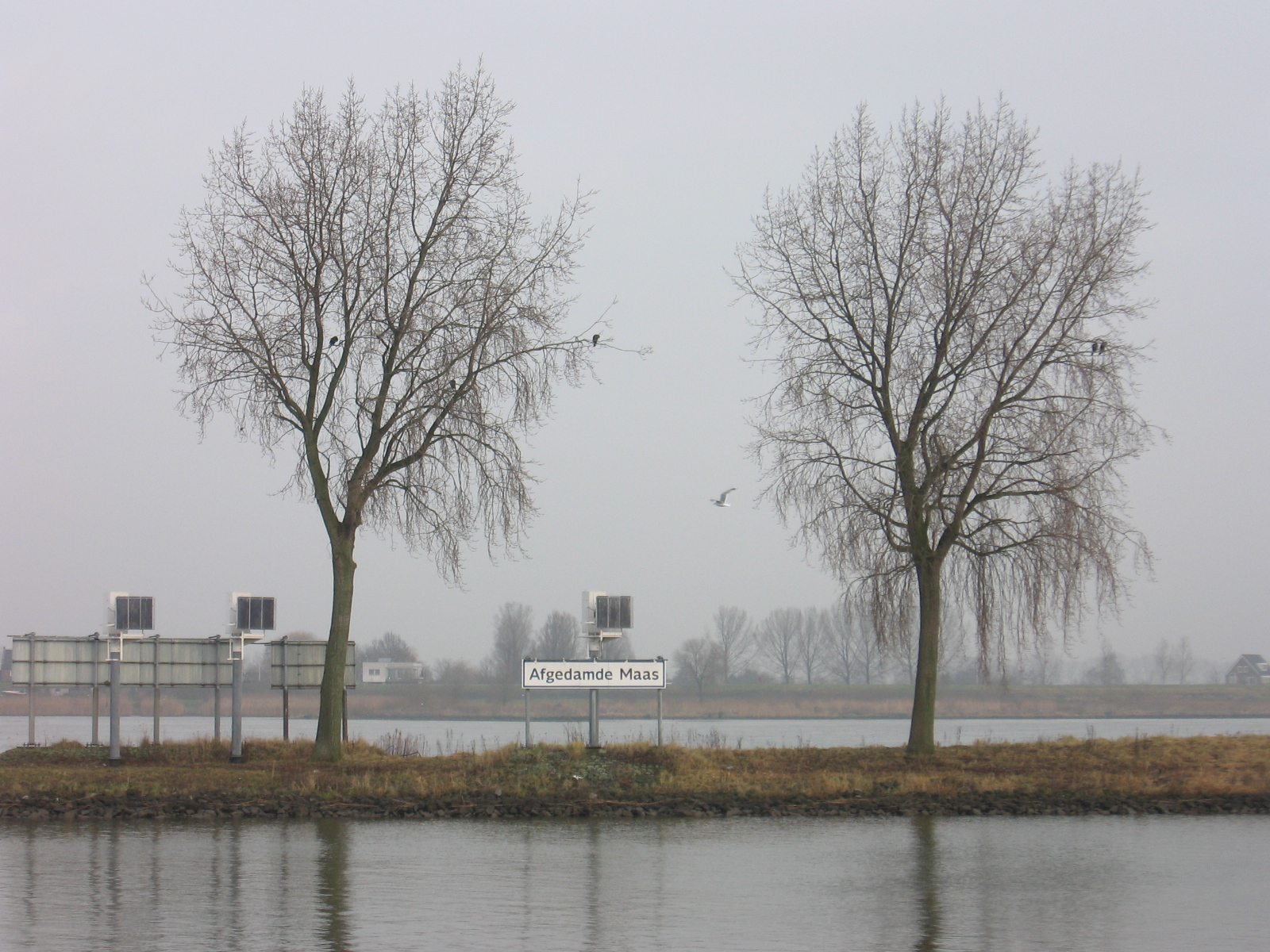

Location
- Country: Netherlands
- Province: North Brabant, Gelderland

Physical characteristics
- Source: Maas
  - location: Heusden
- Mouth: Boven Merwede
  - location: Woudrichem

The Afgedamde Maas (Dutch pronunciation: [ˌɑfxədɑmdə ˈmaːs]; Dammed-up Meuse) is a former distributary of the Maas River (French: Meuse) in the Dutch provinces of North Brabant and Gelderland. The Maas splits near Heusden with one channel flowing north until its confluence with the river Waal (the main distributary of the river Rhine) to form the Merwede, while the other channel (the Bergse Maas) continues west as the main distributary of the Maas.

== History ==
The current Afgedamde Maas was created in the late Middle Ages, when a major flood made a connection between the Maas and the Merwede at the town of Woudrichem. From that moment on, the current Afgedamde Maas was the main branch of the river Maas. The former main branch eventually silted up and is today called the Oude Maasje. With the completion of the Wilhelminasluis (nl) in 1896, the connection between the Maas and Rhine was closed. The resulting separation of the rivers Rhine and Maas reduced the risk of flooding and is considered to be the greatest achievement in Dutch hydraulic engineering before the completion of the Zuiderzee Works and Delta Works. In 1904, the Maas was damned off at its southern end and given an artificial mouth, the Bergse Maas. The closed off portion was then named the Afgedamde Maas and was connected to the Bergse Maas via the Heusden Canal to retain shipping between the Maas and Rhine. Floods of the waterway in 1993 and 1995, however, created the need to be able to close the Heusden Canal off from the Bergse Maas and maintain a fixed water level, and the Kromme Nolkering (nl) control lock was completed in 2002.

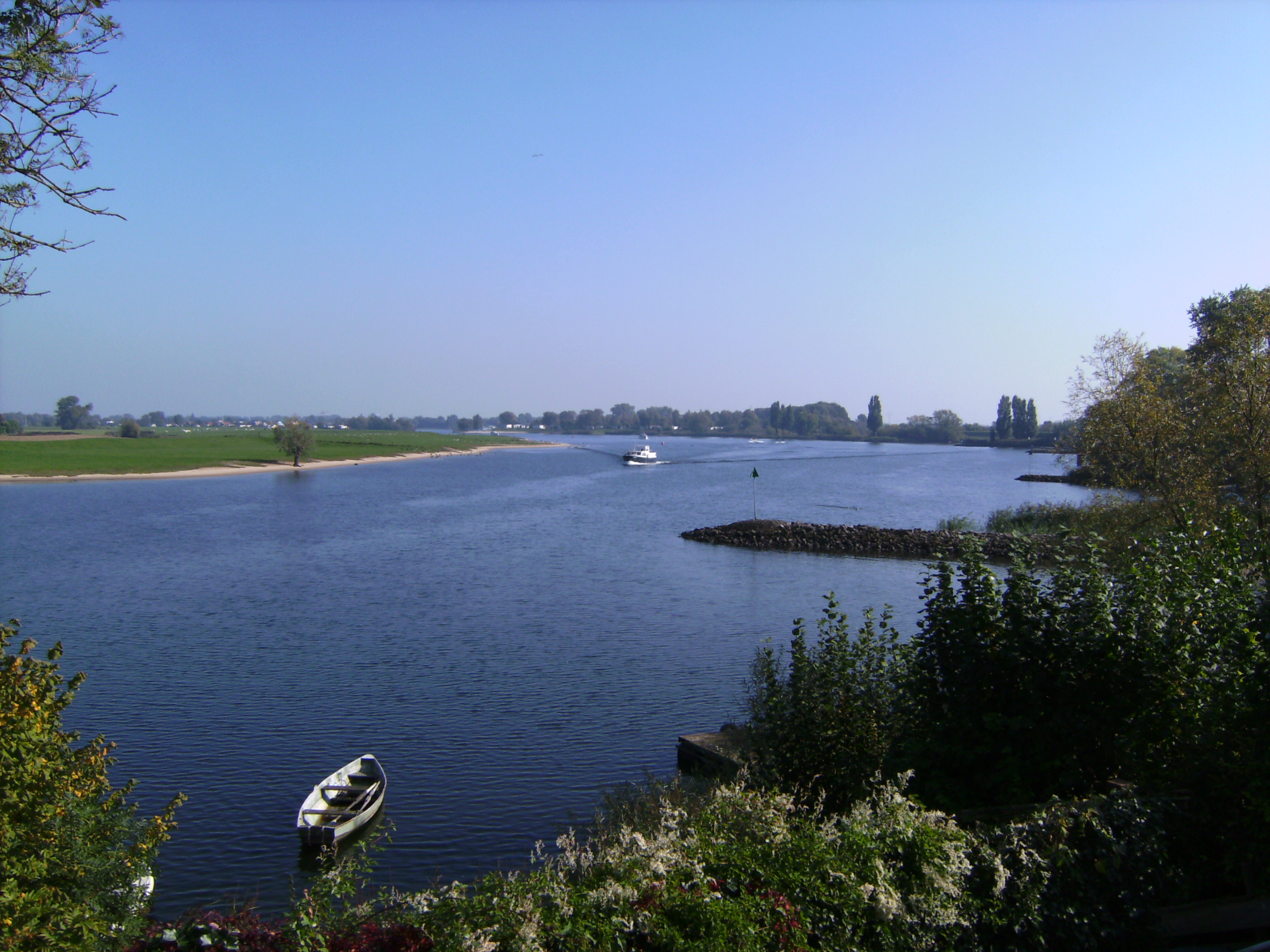
Near Andel

== Transport ==
There is a car ferry, not operating on Sundays, and a foot passenger ferry.
