= Arnt van der Dussen =

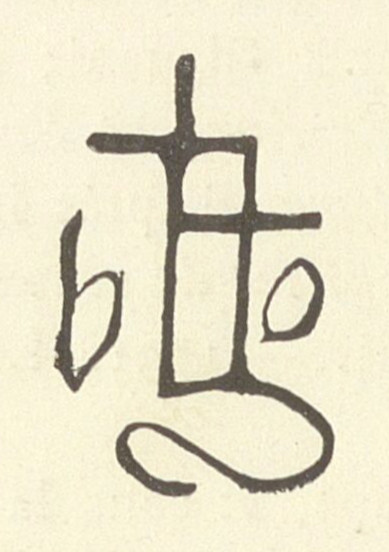
- Monogram of Rinaldo Boteram.
- Born: 1417–1418; Brussels
- Died: 1484–1502; Brussels
- Other name: Rinaldo Boteram
- Citizenship: Republic of Siena; Marquisate of Mantua; Republic of Venice; Marquisate of Ferrara
- Occupation: Master upholsterer

Arnt van der Dussen, also known as Rinaldo Boteram, born in Brussels between 1417 and 1418, and died in the same city between 1484 and 1502, was a Brabant tapestry maker and merchant.

Arnt van der Dussen played a central role in the introduction and spread of Flemish tapestries in fifteenth-century Italy. For half a century, he travelled between Italy and the Burgundian Netherlands, establishing a network of contacts and clients and corresponding personally with important members of the Italian courts, such as the Marquise of Mantua, Barbara of Gonzaga.

Rinaldo Boteram is a minor figure in the history of art and the early Renaissance and, as with most people of his time and rank, there are only fragmentary traces of his itinerary, sometimes difficult to interpret, in various documents.

Despite this scarcity of documentation and therefore of historical analyses, the study of his life allows for a better understanding of the history of tapestry, but also of commercial and cultural exchanges between northern and southern Europe in the 15th century, as well as the evolution of morality and ideas in the West at the time of the First Renaissance.

== Historical background ==
The 15th century was a period of transition for the Belgian provinces, but also for the entire West.

At the political level, the Belgian provinces were united under Burgundian rule, while the great city-states of northern Italy were ruled by influential families (the Sforzas in Milan, the Este family of Modena in Ferrara, the Gonzagas in Mantua, the Medicis in Florence). The Byzantine Empire also declined and the arrival of refugees in Italy led to a rediscovery of ancient philosophies which gave rise to the Renaissance.

Secondly, on an economic level, there was a shift in economic power from the County of Flanders to the Duchy of Brabant. Even though it remained the center of financial activity thanks to very active Italian bankers (the Medici branch in particular), Bruges lost control of international trade to Antwerp because of the silting up of the Zwin and unhelpful regulations. In general, there was economic growth: first in Italy and then in the rest of Europe. This prosperity boosted trade and led to an artistic and philosophical boom thanks to patronage: this was the First Renaissance and the origin of humanism.

This is the background to the life and career of Arnt van der Dussen, known as Rinaldo Boteram.

== Biography ==
=== First name, last name, and nickname ===
Since spelling was not standardised in the 15th century, the spelling of Arnt van der Dussen's first and last names varied greatly.

The first name Arnt is also written Aernt, Arent, Aert or Arnd and means Arnaud, Arnould or Renaud in French. In the same way, the Italian spelling of the name varies from one document to another: Arnaldo, Rinaldo, Rainaldo, Rainaldus, Renaldi or Renaldo.

On his arrival in Italy, Arnt van der Dussen adapted his father's first name to use it as a patronym: Wouter/Walter (Gauthier in French) became Gualtieri or Gualdire.

The origin of the nickname Boteram, which means "buttered toast" in Dutch, has not yet been found, but it was already used by his father and later by his children and grandchildren. A variation boterman indicates the possibility that his family produced or sold butter.

=== Family ===
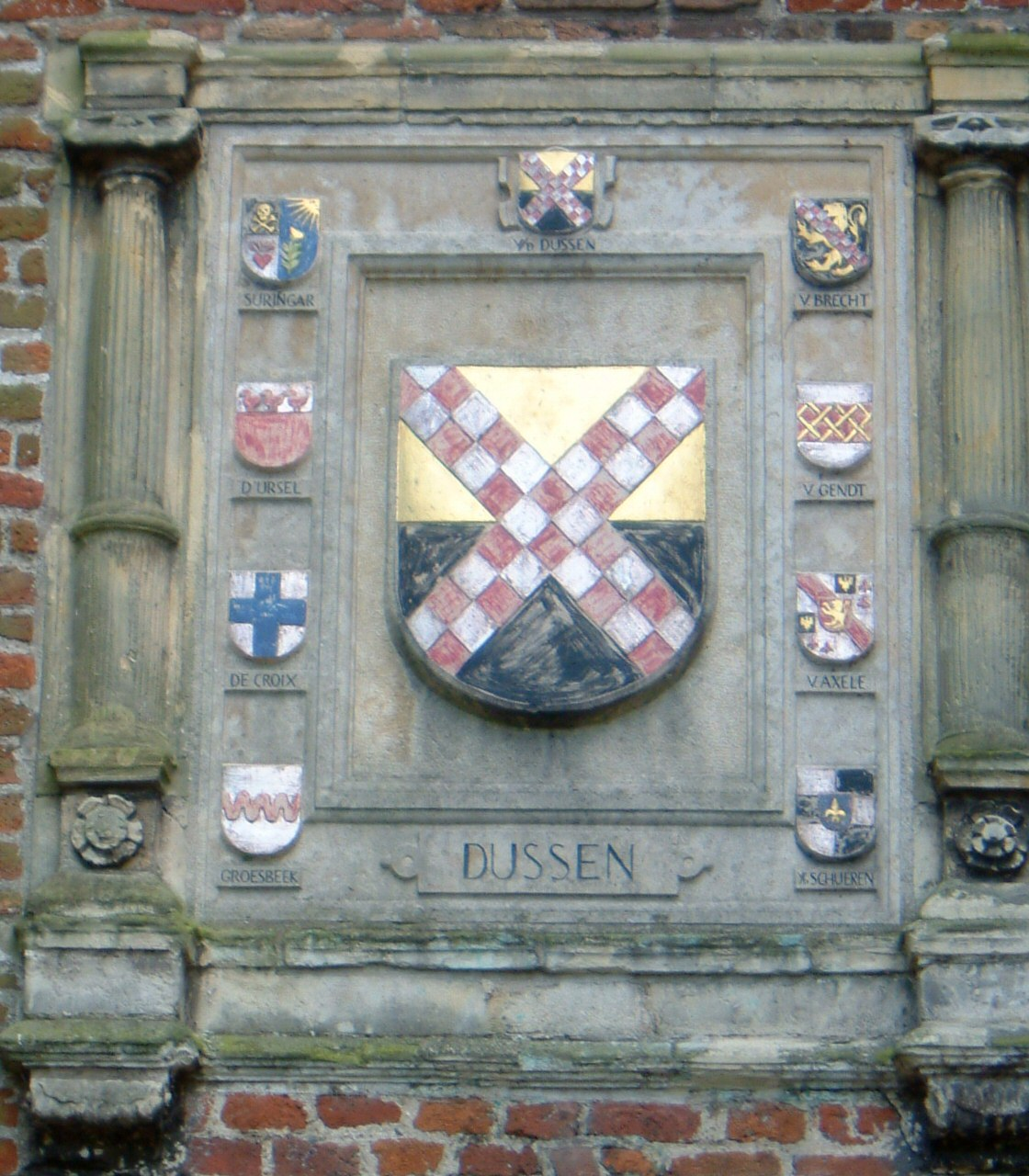
The coat of arms of the van der Dussen family, visible above the entrance to Dussen Castle.

The only son of Wouter (or Walter, Gauthier in French) van der Dussen, he married Lysbeth Mostincx, daughter of Jan Mostincx, who gave him five children: Jan; Steven, who succeeded his father as a tapestry maker; Wouter, who became a medical doctor; Margaretha; Maria.

He also has two illegitimate children with Cathelyne Van de Bossche: Aert and Cathelyne.

Arnt van der Dussen's father, Wouter, came from a distinguished family from Dussen, whose main branch resided at Dussen Castle. Boteram's mother may have come from a family of Brussels upholsterers.

=== Professional life ===
The disparity and scarcity of documents devoted to minor figures such as Arnt van der Dussen give the impression of a disjointed life. These documents make it possible to trace Boteram's professional career, but without providing any depth: without discoveries, any biographical analysis is therefore condemned to appear fragmented and incomplete.

==== Apprenticeship ====
He is mentioned for the first time as an apprentice upholsterer in the "Registre des inscriptions au Grand Métier de la laine de Bruxelles" in 1431–1432. As he is not mentioned as a "franc apprentice", he does not come from a family of upholsterers. It is this document that allows us to estimate his date of birth at around 1417–1418, as the age of apprentice upholsterers varies between 8 and 13 years old. He obtained his master's degree between 1432 and 1438 and either moved to Italy immediately afterwards or lived as a master upholsterer in Brussels along the Zavelbeek (a river in Brussels) before leaving for Siena.

==== Weaver in Siena ====
He appears in 1438 in the documents of the city of Siena as "Rinaldo di Gualtieri, fiammingo, maestro di panni d'arrazo" and "Renaldo di Gualtieri de la Magna Basa, maestro di panni di Razo", i.e. "Renaud son of Gauthier, Flemish from Lower Germany, master upholsterer in the manner of Arras (historiated upholstery)". According to him, he left his country because of the "misfortunes of the times" (mali temporali). On 19 November 1438, he therefore obtained an annual grant of 20 gold florins from the Sienese for two years, during which time he undertook to teach his trade to two Sienese students while carrying out his activity in the city, in particular by making upholstery to decorate the Palazzo Publicco.

On 14 March 1440 he asked for an extension of the contract for ten years, giving the following reasons: firstly, he was the only one in Siena who practised the art of upholstery; secondly, it was impossible for him to teach upholstery in such a short time; and thirdly, he had already produced several works, one of which was about to be finished, and he had received several commissions from private individuals. He received a new grant for six years with the obligation to take on two new apprentices.

However, the payment of the subsidy ceased on 13 January 1442, and he was replaced by Jacquet d'Arras, who was directly awarded an annual grant of 45 gold florins for a period of ten years.

==== Weaver in Mantua ====
He is traced back to February 1449 as a "master upholsterer" attached to the service of the House of Gonzaga at the court of Mantua. We know that he had been living in the city for some time, probably since the end of his contract in Siena in 1442. He remained in the service of the House of Gonzaga until 1457, when the Marquis Louis III the Turk recommended him to the Duke of Modena Borso d'Este in Ferrara.

Historians, such as Viviane Baesens, suspect that he was mainly involved in teaching his art during his stay in Mantua and point to the presence of Italian weavers at the Mantuan workshop in the following years as evidence. Hillie Smit explains, however, that he was particularly involved in the acquisition of Flanders tapestries based on drawings by Mantuan court artists such as the miniaturist Giacomo Bellanti.

Documents indicate that Boteram was also active in Florence during this period, since in 1452 a certain Rainaldus Gualtieri was captain of the Brotherhood of Saint Barbara, which included several Flemish upholsterers and craftsmen.

==== Merchant in Venice ====
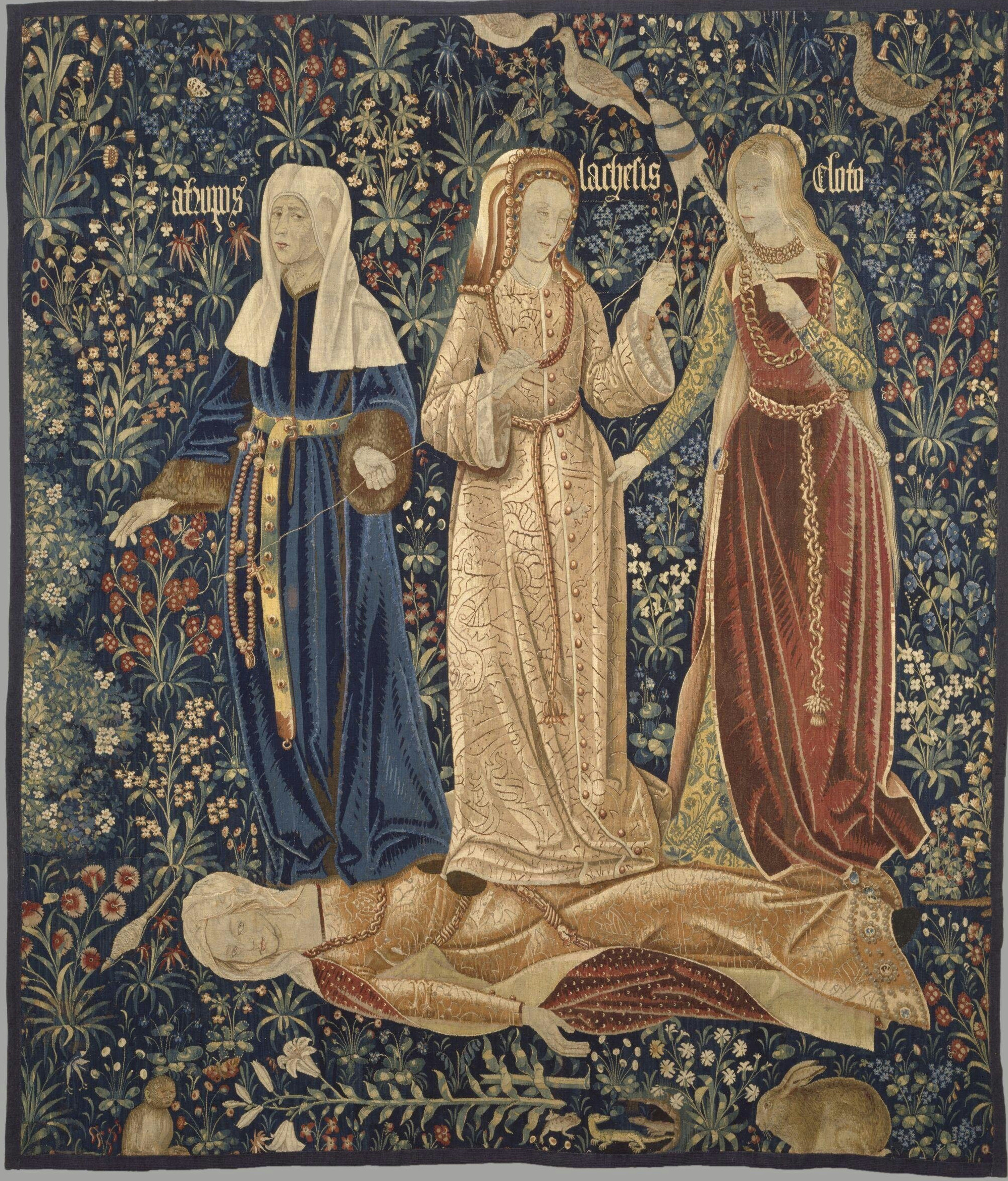
Mille-fleurs from the Flemish school of the early 16th century, probably of Brussels origin.

When he left the service of the Mantuans, Boteram seems to have turned exclusively to the upholstery trade, which was more lucrative than the activity of weaver. Hillie Smit implies that Boteram may have started this activity as early as 1450 by pointing out his visits to the Antwerp fair where he acquired tapestries which he then sold in Italy to influential people. This is in line with the analysis of Jacques Lavalleye who states that Rinaldo de Gualtieri, nicknamed Boteram of Brussels, was present in Ferrara in 1450 during the reign of Lionel d'Este.

During this period, main sources establish that Rinaldo Boteram settled in Venice: he was paid in Venetian currency (the ducato d'oro de Venezia) and his dealings with the Gonzagas were handled by a syer righo couet yn fonticho [a Venezen] who was probably a French banker based in Venice. Hillie Smit points to the possibility (though no concrete evidence is found to support it) that Boteram owned a house in Venice since tapestries destined for Ferrara were transported from Venice.

In 1457, Duke Borso d'Este acquired several upholsteries in two purchases from Rinaldo di Gualdire: a series to decorate the rooms, a "verdure à animaux" ("mille-fleurs") and six historiated curtains (two upholsteries of the Story of Our Lady of Montferrat, two of the Story of Judith and Holofernes, a Story of Esther and a Story of Joseph). In addition to importing tapestries from the Burgundian Netherlands, Boteram also helped run Italian workshops in Ferrara: notably during the reign of Borso, where Boteram assisted Liévin de Bruges, who had become the workshop manager.

The available documents show that the upholstery trade was very lucrative and that the tapestries supplied by Rinaldo Boteram were of remarkable quality. Indeed, he was paid more than 900 ducats in certain transactions and master weavers from Tournai such as Jehan Myle (Giovanni or Jean Mille) and Renaud Grue (Rinaldo De Grue) were invited to supply tapestries of a quality equivalent to those of Boteram.

Between 1462 and 1470, he supplied the duke on numerous occasions with rooms, armorial and historiated hangings (in particular, a tapestry on an Episode of the Life of Ahab from a workshop in Ferrara), tapestry banks (tapestry intended to cover a bench) and bedstead carpets, while selling several tapestries to court lords. Borso d'Este's successor, Hercules I, continued to buy from Boteram until 1481.

In addition to the House of Este in Ferrara, he also continued to supply the House of Gonzaga in Mantua with upholstery throughout the period 1462-1481 and he even maintained a correspondence with the Marchioness Barbara of Gonzaga where it appears, in a letter of 1466, that some deliveries of upholstery had been paid for by Pigello Portinari and that Boteram asked the Marchioness to write to the Duchess Bianca Sforza of Milan that he had been paid. It is therefore more than likely that Boteram even delivered tapestries to the Sforza of Milan, for which payment was then made via the Medici branch in Milan.

The Marquis of Mantua, Frederico Gonzaga, who seems to have little love for tapestries since he sent the tapestry-makers back to the court, granted Boteram in March 1480 an import licence for five to six pieces each year. He must therefore have ceased his commercial activity around 1481, since we lose track of him that year in the Italian archives, only to find him the following year in Brussels.

==== Municipal Councilor in Brussels ====
Letters from Arnt Van der Dussen to the Marquise of Ferrara indicate that he left his family in the country, and a text from the "Comptes du Domaine de Bruxelles" attests that he still owned a house there in 1480–1481.

The exact date of his final return to Brussels is not known, but Viviane Baesens estimates it at 1481, highlighting his role as a municipal councillor in 1482 and 1484. Hillie Smit points out that he was a municipal councillor of the Brussels magistracy in 1474-1475 and in 1483–1484, when he was registered under the name Arnoul Van der Dussen, known as Boteram.

The date of his death is uncertain. Viviane Baesens gives the date of 1484 on the basis of documents in the Houwaert collection. Hillie Smit specifies that according to the available documents Boteram was still alive in 1491 and that at that time his wife, Lysbeth Mostincx, was in charge of his affairs. According to Hillie Smit, he died around 1501–1502.

== Historical review ==
=== The main studies on Arnt van der Dussen ===
Only two historians have published an article entirely devoted to Arnt van der Dussen, and both have mainly confined themselves to listing the available data on his life without making extensive analyses of Boteram's environment.

The first, Belgian Viviane Baesens, focused on Boteram's professional life and the recently discovered documents on him in Brussels, while attempting to demonstrate Sophie Schneebalg-Perelman's theories devoted to a positive reassessment of the importance of Brussels upholstery workshops during the fifteenth century. The second, the Dutchwoman Hillie Smit, focused her paper on the remains of Boteram's tapestries and his family origins. They both tried to show that Arnt van der Dussen and Rinaldo Boteram were one and the same person.

Their studies are contradictory on some points:

- a possible family link with the tapestry activity:
  - Viviane Baesens considers that Arnt van der Dussen had no family link with upholstery since his apprenticeship contract did not define him as a "franc apprentice",
  - Smit, on the other hand, underlines the possibility that his mother came from a family of upholsterers, since he had cousins in Ferrara who were not upholsterers with the same surname as him;
- the living conditions before leaving for Italy:
  - Baesens believes that Boteram left Brussels immediately after his apprenticeship,
  - Smit cites sources indicating that he set up an upholstery workshop in his home town for a time before leaving;
- the date of death of Arnt van der Dussen:
  - Baesens considers that the documents of the Houwaert Fund attest to a death in 1484,
  - Smit, who bases himself on a document from 1502 that speaks of the widowhood of Boteram's wife, considers that he must have died in that year or the year before.

=== Controversy over Boteram's identity ===
The signature of "Arnaldo also known as Boetram" in his letter of 16 June 1466 from Brussels to Barbara of Brandenburg in Mantua (adapted from Hillie Smit's drawing).

In his book "Deux siècles de l'histoire de la tapisserie, 1300-1500. Paris, Arras, Lille, Tournai, Brussels", Jean Lestocquoy questions the traditional hypothesis that identifies "Rinaldo di Gualtieri"/"Renaldo di Gualtieri de la Magna Basa" with the upholsterer Arnt Van der Dussen, known as Rinaldo Boteram.

However, this theory is ruled out by the cross-referencing of documents referring to the same work (The History of Joseph acquired by Duke Borso d'Este in 1457 from "Rinaldo di Gualdire"/"Renaud Boteram de Bruxelles"), by the rarity of the first name Gauthier (Walter/Wouter) in the Burgundian Netherlands of the time, and by the use of the term "Magna Basa" ("Lower Germany") to refer to the Netherlands from the 15th to the 17th centuries in Italy.

Hillie Smit also defends the traditional hypothesis in her biographical article by pointing out that Arnt van der Dussen signs his letters with "Arnaldo ditto Boteram" or "Arnaldo also known as Boetram" when he is better known as Rinaldo Boteram.

=== Legacy ===
No tapestry is currently attributed to Arnt Van der Dussen.

There is, however, a tapestry linked to Boteram's commercial activities: Judith taking Holoferne's head. This tapestry, which is currently in the collection of the Metropolitan Museum of Art in New York, was made in the Burgundian Netherlands around 1455-1465 and is believed to have been delivered by Boteram to the Court of Este.

Indeed, the description of a portière in the inventory of the tapestries of the Maison d'Este and delivered by Boteram is strikingly similar to the central section of the New York tapestry:

"Uno Antiporto de razo lungo bra. 3 1/2 e largo bra. 2 1/2 fatto di uno pavaione morelo, sotto el quale e in uno leto olifernes nudo cum una dona che li ha talgiato la testa, che ha la spada da una mane e da laltra la testa del dito olifernes per li capili cum la quale porze dita testa a unaltra dona che ha uno carniero in mane, el quale epsa porze per metere dentro dita testa"

Or in French :

"A satin doorway 3.5 fathoms long (3.5x1.83 m - in Italian measures - or 6.4 m) and 2.5 fathoms wide (4.575 m)', representing a brownish coloured pavilion, under which is, in a bed, Holofernes naked with a woman who has cut off his head, who holds a sword in one hand and in the other hand the head of the said Holofernes by the hair, with which she hands the said head to another woman who holds a leather purse, which she holds out to put the said head inside".

=== The place and reputation of Brussels upholsterers in 15th century Italy ===
According to Viviane Baesens, Boteram's professional success demonstrates that the reputation of Brussels upholsterers was established abroad (particularly in Italy) in the same way as that of the upholsterers of Tournai and Arras. This viewpoint reinforces Sophie Schneebalg-Perelman's hypotheses concerning the importance of Brussels workshops in the 15th century.

We also know that Boteram was not the only Brussels weaver in Mantua: three weavers working at the court are said to be "from Brussels": Pietro, Enrico and Giovanni. For Viviane Baesens, it is likely that this Pietro from Brussels, who had been present in Mantua since 1450, was the "cousin Piero" mentioned by Boteram in a letter of 1474, and that he brought in workers and other members of his family or acquaintances. This letter also mentions a "Rigo", which Viviane Baessens assumes is also a relative of Boteram and that it is the Rigo who is found as an upholsterer in Ferrara in 1479.

=== Trade and cultural exchanges between the Burgundian Netherlands and Italy ===
Arnt Van der Dussen, also known as Rinaldo Boteram, was one of those master upholsterers who travelled throughout Europe, combining the establishment of weaving workshops in the Italian peninsula with the supervision of the commissioning and production of tapestries from the Burgundian Netherlands for Italian sponsors.

During the Renaissance, art increasingly took on a political function and was used in Italy to underline the power of families or city-states. Upholstery was fashionable at the time, but some of the technical aspects of its design escaped the Italian craftsmen, who lacked mastery and creativity - particularly in the painting of fabric to execute the patterns to scale. This is a shame because these patterns are valuable objects that can take months to create. The main problem is that the Italian painters executing these patterns to be sent to the Burgundian Netherlands apply too thick a layer of colour, which then comes off during transit: re-use of the pattern then requires restoration. In this situation, the advantage of having artists experienced in foreign techniques becomes obvious and reinforces the artistic domination of the most powerful sponsors. In addition, having such craftsmen on hand instead of commissioning them in a distant country had the advantage of being able to direct them and monitor their work. Arnt van der Dussen is one of the most representative examples, as he was successively employed by various city-states as a craftsman, teacher, intermediary or importer:

- Frederick III of Montefeltro, Duke of Urbino, sending to the Austrian Netherlands for a master oil painter that he was unable to find in Italy;
- Francesco Sforza, Duke of Milan, sending the painter Zanetto Bugatto to Brussels to study with Rogier van der Weyden;
- Alfonso V, King of Aragon, gave 100 Castilian florins to the painter Lluís Dalmau in 1431 so that the latter could travel to the Burgundian Netherlands where he improved his technique and where he probably took part in the tapestry trade;
- Isabella I of Castile, Queen of Castile and León, was the patron who made most use of foreign artists.

Some historians, such as Lorne Campbell, have highlighted the potential role of upholsterers such as Arnt van der Dussen in the influence of certain artistic trends and patterns between northern and southern Europe. Indeed, various artists were linked to the upholstery merchants. For Elisabeth Dhanens, it is possible that Rogier van der Weyden (who worked in Brussels) accompanied Boteram on his trip to Italy in 1450. Wauters even believes that van der Weyden may have participated in the upholstery trade.

Philosophical ideas and ambitions were also driven by trade: humanism - which stemmed from the rediscovery of the ancient philosophical heritage - was born in Italy and first reached the Burgundian Netherlands in the second half of the fifteenth century and then spread throughout Europe. The importance of the Burgundian Netherlands as a central node in the international trade of the time is reflected in the penetration of humanist ideas in the region: it was Italian merchants (including Boteram, as he traded on behalf of the powerful in Italy) who spread humanism as they arrived in Bruges and Antwerp.

== Appendices ==
=== Related articles ===
- Upholstery
- Patronage
- Renaissance
- Brussels
- Italian Renaissance

=== External links ===
- The Studies in Western Tapestry : Centralization of historical and scientific research on tapestry.
- (fr) Le Centre de la Tapisserie, des Arts du Tissu et des Arts muraux ofTournai
- (fr) Le musée de la Tapisserie of Tournai

=== Bibliography ===
==== Main books used in writing the article ====
- Viviane, Baesens (1988). "Nouvelle Biographie Nationale". Boteram Rinaldo (in French). Brussels: Académie Royale de Belgique. pp. 15–18. ISSN 0776-3948.
- Elizabeth, Cleland (2007). "Locating Renaissance Art". Tapestries in a transnational artistic commodity. Yale University Press. pp. 103–134. ISBN 978-0300121889.
- Elisabeth, Dhanens; Jellie, Dijkstra (September 23, 1999). "Locating Renaissance Art". Rogier de le Pasture van der Weyden. Références (in French). Tournai: La Renaissance du Livre. p. 208.
- Jannic, Durand (2004). L'art du Moyen Âge. Comprendre et reconnaître (in French). Paris: Larousse-Bordas. p. 144. ISBN 978-2035055118.
- Guimbaud, Louis (1973) [1944]. La tapisserie de haute et de basse lisse. Les arts décoratifs (in French). Paris: Flammarion. p. 64. ISBN 978-2080103369.
- Lavalleye, Jacques (1936). Juste de Gand. Peintre de Frédéric de Montefeltre (in French). Louvain-Rome: Bibliothèque de l’Université (Fondation Nationale Princesse Marie-José). p. 208.
- Gaetano, Milanesi (1854). Documenti per la storia dell'arte senese (in Italian). Vol. I. Siena: Presso Onorato Porri.
- Nash, Susan (2008) [1963]. Northern Renaissance Art. The Oxford History of Art. Oxford University Press. p. 384. ISBN 978-0-19-284269-5.
- Roblot-Delondre L. (1919). Les sujets antiques dans la tapisserie (suite). Revue archéologique (in French). Pottier Edmond and Reinach Salomon (dir) (5th ed.). Paris: Éditions Ernest Leroux. pp. 294–332. ISSN 0035-0737.
- Hillie, Smit (2002). Some biographical notes on Rinaldo Boteram, weaver and merchant of Flemish tapestries in fifteenth century Italy. Aux Quatre Vents. À Festschrift for Bert W. Meijer. Boschloo Anton W.A., Grasman Edward and Van der Sman Gert (dir). Firenze: Edizioni Centro Di. pp. 179–182. ISBN 88-7038-392-X.
- Hillie, Smit (1995). Tapijthandel op Italië rond 1450. De Medicibank en de familie Grenier. Textielhistorische Bijdragen (in Dutch). Vol. XXXIV. Firenze: Stichting Textielgeschiedenis. pp. 179–182. ISBN 9071715094.

==== Further reading ====
===== On tapestry in general =====
- Jules, Guiffret (1878–1885). Histoire générale de la tapisserie (in French). Eugène Müntz andPinchard Joseph Alexandre (dir). Paris: Société anonyme de publications périodiques.

==== On tapestry factories in northern Italy ====
- Willelmo, Braghirolli (1879). Sulle Manifatture di Arrazi in Mantova (in Italian). Mantova: Eredi Segna editori.
- Campori, Giuseppe (1980) [1876]. L'Arazzeria estense (in Italian). Bologna: Arnaldo Forni. p. 127.
- Forti Grazzini Nelo (1982). L'arrazo ferrarese (in Italian). Milano: Electa. p. 239.
- Venturi A. (1885). L'arte a Ferrara nel periodo di Borso d'Este. Rivista storica italiana (in Italian). pp. 712, 745–746.
- Viale-Ferrero M. (1961). Arrazi italiana (in Italian). pp. 14–15.

==== On tapestry within the commercial and cultural exchanges between the Burgundian Netherlands and Italy ====
- Campbell Lorne, "The art market in the Southern Netherlands in the fifteenth century" in The Burlington Magazine, n°118, 1976, pp. 188–198.
- Campbell Lorne, "Notes on Netherlandish pictures in the Veneto in the fifteenth and sixteenth centuries" in The Burlington Magazine, n°123, 1981, pp. 467–473.
- Forti Grazzini Nello (1990). Arrazi di Bruxelles in Italia, 1480-1535 (in Italian). Vol. Storia dell'Arte e della Cultura. Trento: Éditrice TeMi. pp. 35–71. ISBN 9788885114104.
- Sophie, Schneebalg-Perelman (1969). Le rôle de la banque de Médicis dans la diffusion des tapisseries flamandes (in French). Vol. XXXVIII. Revue belge d'Archéologie et d'Histoire de l'Art. pp. 19–41.
- Hillie, Smit (1999). Un si bello et onorato mistero. Flemish weavers employed by the City Government of Siena (1438-1480). proceedings of the symposium held at Museum Catharijneconvent, Utrecht, 14 March 1994 (in French). Firenze: (Istituto Universitario Olandese di Storia dell'Arte) Edizioni Centro Di. pp. 67–78. ISBN 88-7038-340-7.

==== On Brussels upholsterers ====
- Duverger J (1934). Brusselse legwerckers uit de XVIe en XVe eeuw (in Dutch). Gentse Bijdragen tot de Kunstgeschiedenis. pp. 222, 226–227, 235.
- Forti Grazzini Nello (1990). Arrazi di Bruxelles in Italia, 1480-1535 (in Italian). Vol. Storia dell'Arte e della Cultura. Trento: Éditrice TeMi. pp. 35–71. ISBN 9788885114104.
- Jean, Lestocquoy (1978). Deux siècles de l'histoire de la tapisserie, 1300-1500. Paris, Arras, Lille, Tournai, Bruxelles (in French). Arras: Commission départementale des Monuments Historiques du Pas-de-Calais. p. 140.
- Alphonse-Jules, Wauters (1878). Les tapisseries bruxelloises. Essai historique sur les tapisseries et les tapissiers de haute- et basse-lice de Bruxelles (in French). Brussels: Imprimerie de Ve Julien Baertsoen. p. 477.

==== Archives ====
Based on the article by Viviane Baesens :

- (fr) Actes scabinaux of Brussels, n°9414.
- (fr) Archives générales du Royaume, Brussels, Métiers et Serments, n°944bis (Registre des inscriptions au Grand Métier de la laine de Bruxelles, year 1431–32).
- (fr) Bibliothèque royale Albert I, Brussels, Fonds Houwaert, ms II 6510, p. 212 and ms 6598, p. 165.
- (fr) Chambre des Comptes, Comptes du Domaine de Bruxelles, n°4185, folio 8 verso; n°44831 folio 69-2 verso; n°44832 folio 65 verso
