= Henri Karel Frederik van Teijn =

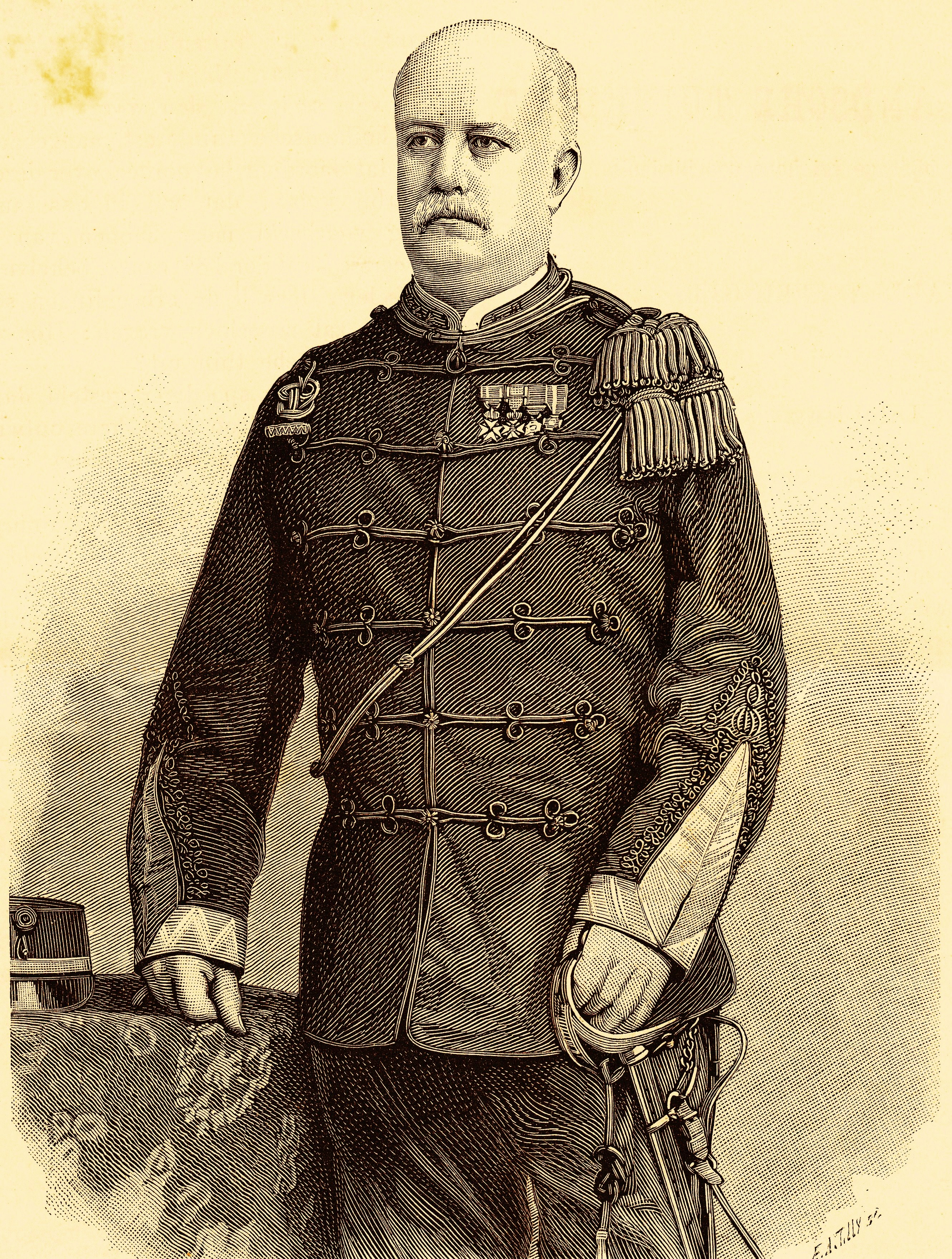
- Born: 28 February 1839; Dussen, North Brabant
- Died: 26 June 1892 (aged 53); Utrecht, Utrecht
- Military career
- Allegiance: Royal Dutch East Indies Army
- Branch: Infantry
- Service years: 1853-1892
- Rank: Major general
- Commands: Governor of Aceh; Royal Dutch East Indies Army
- Conflicts: Aceh War

Henri Karel Frederik van Teijn (28 February 1839, Dussen - 24 June 1892, Utrecht) was a Dutch general, knight and officer in the Military William Order, civil and military governor of Aceh and Dependencies.

== Military decorations ==
- Knight third class of the Military William Order
- Knight of the Order of the Netherlands Lion
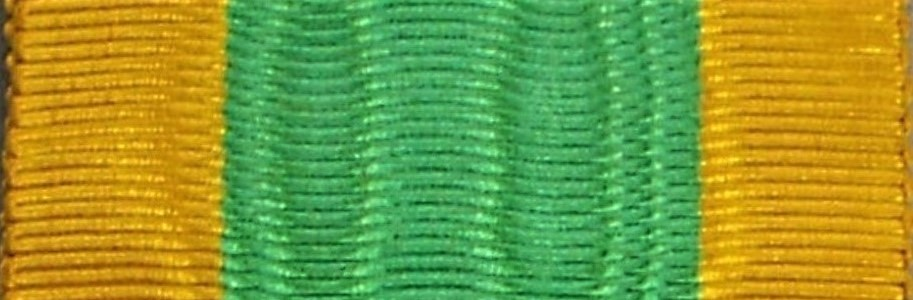
- Expedition Cross with clasp "Aceh 1876-96"
- Medal for Long, Honest and Faithful Service with the figure XXX

== Sources ==
- 1889. Egbert Broer Kielstra. Generaal-majoor H.K.F. van Teijn. Civiel -en Militair Gouverneur van Atjeh en Onderhorigheden. Eigen Haard. Bladzijde 428–430.
- 1903. G. van Steyn. Gedenkboek KMA. P.B. Nieuwenhuijs. Breda.
