= Louis Van Iersel =

US Army sergeant and Medal of Honor recipient (1893–1987)

Ludovicus M. M. Van Iersel
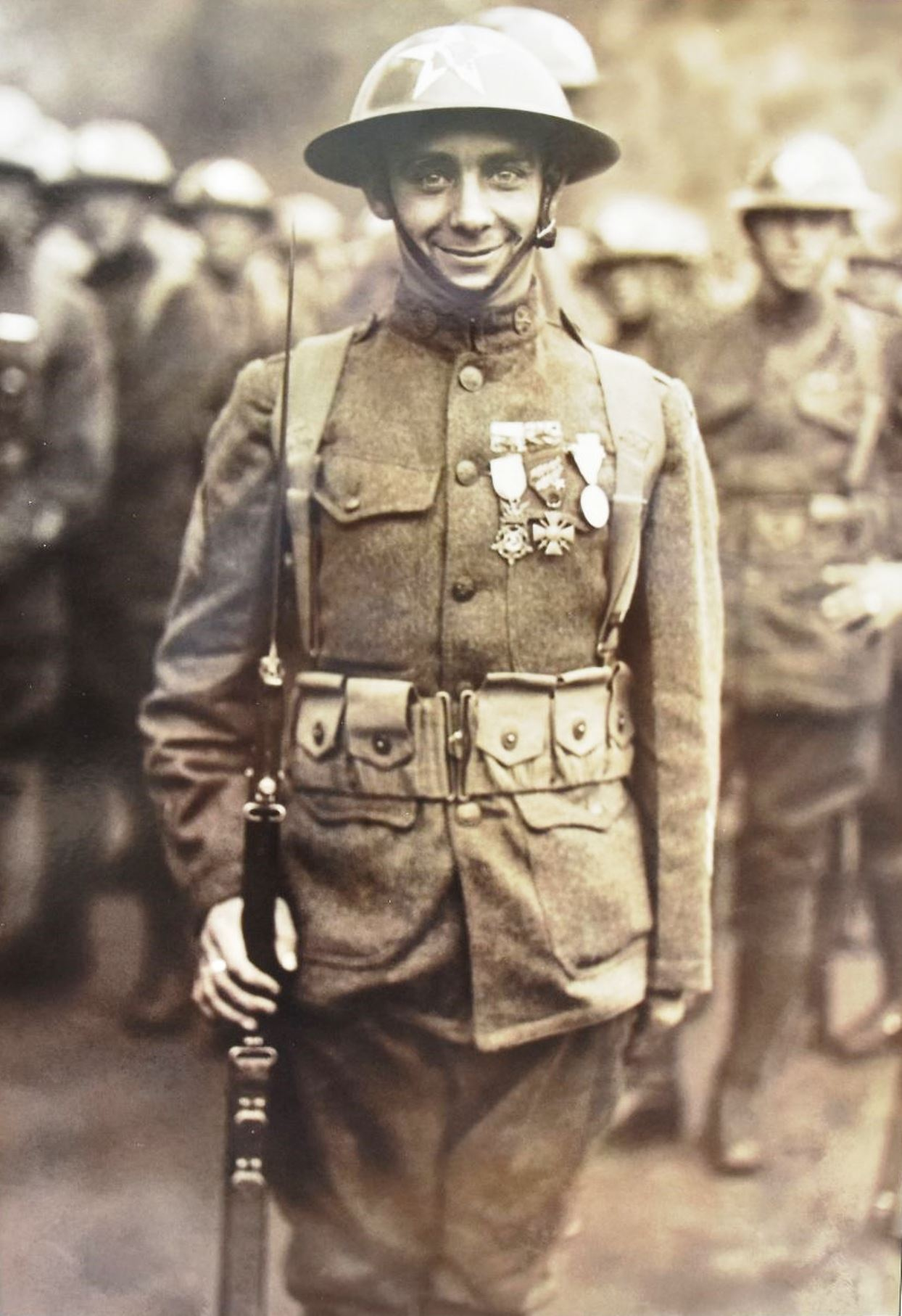
- Sergeant Ludovicus M. M. Van Iersel
- Born: October 19, 1893; Dussen, Netherlands
- Died: June 9, 1987 (aged 93); Sierra Madre, California, US
- Burial place: Arlington National Cemetery
- Military career
- Allegiance: United States
- Branch: United States Army; United States Marine Corps
- Service years: 1917–1919 (Army); 1943–1945 (Marine Corps)
- Rank: Sergeant (Army) Technical Sergeant (Marine Corps)
- Units: Company M, 9th Infantry Regiment, 2nd Division; 3rd Marine Division
- Awards: Medal of Honor; Silver Star; Purple Heart

Ludovicus Maria Matheus Van Iersel (19 October 1893 – 9 June 1987) was a Sergeant in United States Army, Company M, 9th Infantry, 2nd Division during World War I. He earned the highest military decoration for valor in combat—the Medal of Honor—for having distinguished himself at Mouzon, France.

Born in Dussen in the Netherlands, Van Iersel served on several merchant ships following the outbreak of the war. Van Iersel arrived in New Jersey in early 1917, enlisting in the army shortly afterwards. He learned English in his first few months of military service.

He became a naturalized American citizen in September 1919, six months after receiving the Medal of Honor, and changed his name to Louis Van Iersel. After acquiring citizenship he returned to his birth country and married Hendrika de Ronde (1899–1979) in August 1920. They returned to the United States later that month and settled in California a year later. In 1946 he and his wife settled in Sierra Madre, California.

During World War II, he joined the Marine Corps and served with the 3rd Marine Division in the Bougainville Campaign.

He and his wife Hendrika are buried at Arlington National Cemetery, in Arlington, Virginia.

== Medal of Honor citation ==
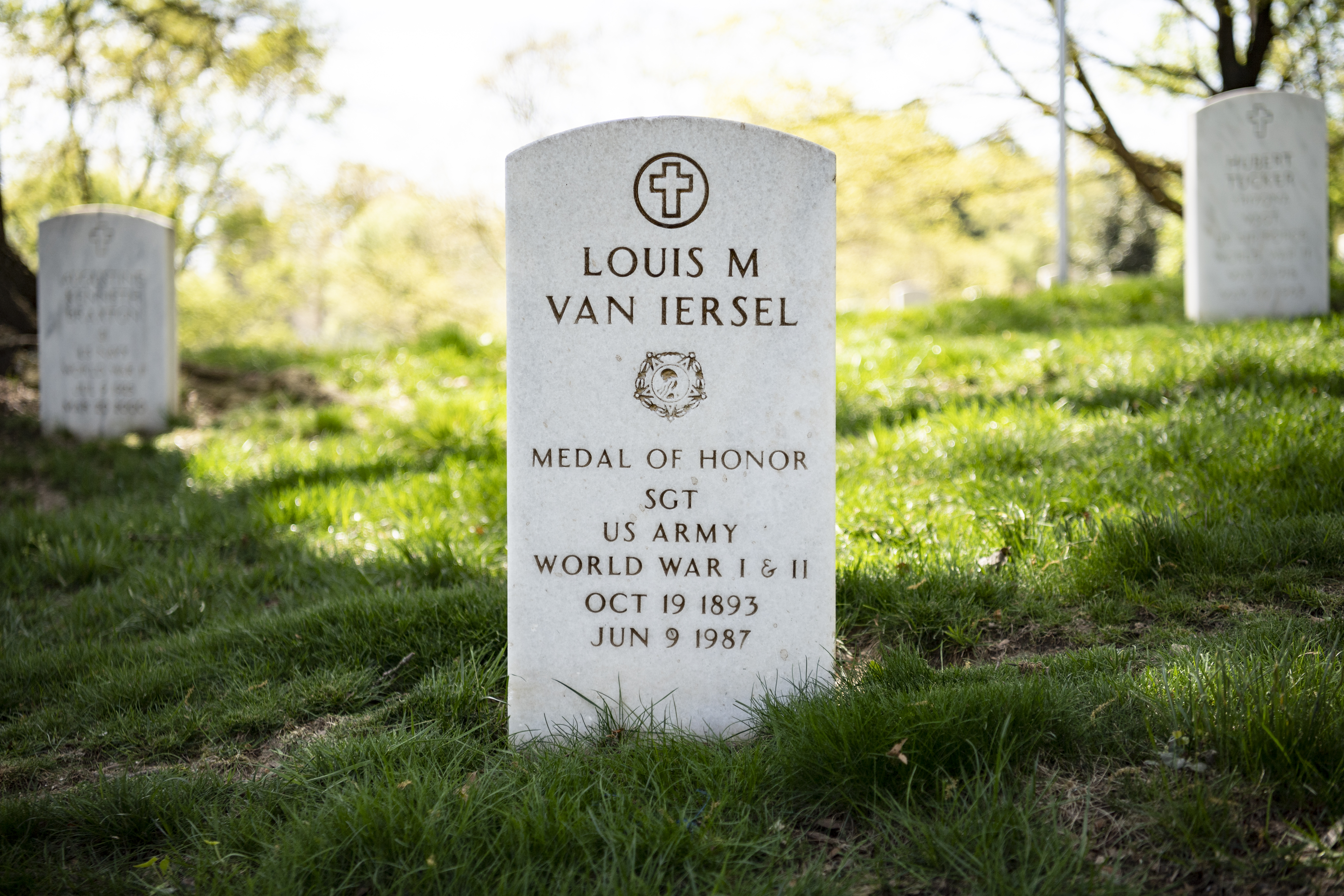
Grave at Arlington National Cemetery

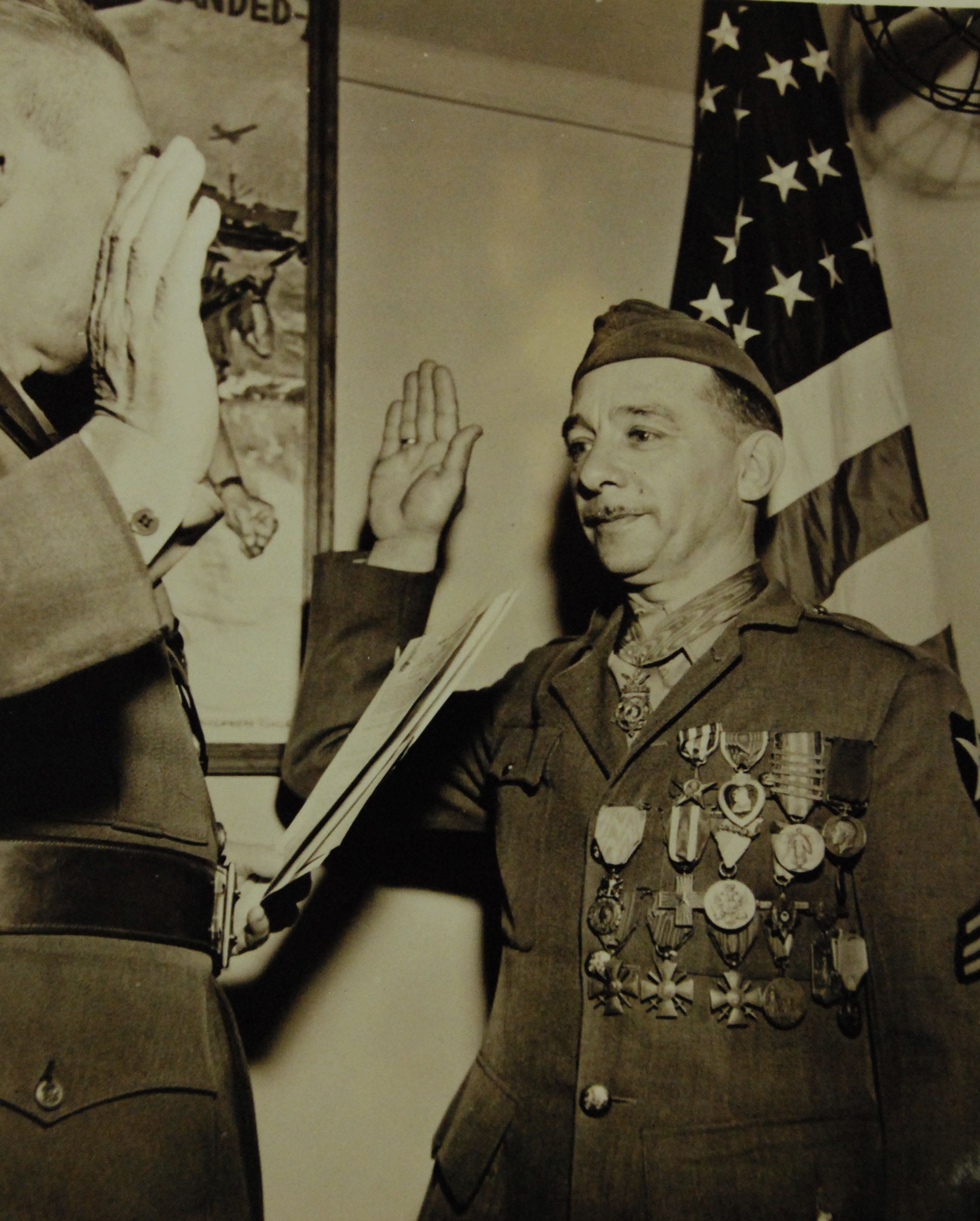
Van Iersel at U.S. Marine recruiting headquarters in Los Angeles, being sworn in to fight in World War II (1942)

- Rank and organization: Sergeant, U.S. Army, Company M, 9th Infantry, 2d Division.
- Place and date: At Mouzon, France, 9 November 1918.
- Entered service at: Glen Rock, New Jersey.
- Birth: the Netherlands.
- General Orders: War Department, General Orders No. 34 (March 7, 1919)

Citation:

While a member of the reconnaissance patrol, sent out at night to ascertain the condition of a damaged bridge, Sgt. Van Iersel volunteered to lead a party across the bridge in the face of heavy machinegun and rifle fire from a range of only 75 yards. Crawling alone along the debris of the ruined bridge he came upon a trap, which gave away and precipitated him into the water. In spite of the swift current he succeeded in swimming across the stream and found a lodging place among the timbers on the opposite bank. Disregarding the enemy fire, he made a careful investigation of the hostile position by which the bridge was defended and then returned to the other bank of the river, reporting this valuable information to the battalion commander.

== Military awards ==
van Iersel's military decorations and awards include:

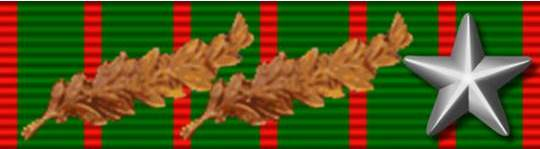

1st row	Medal of Honor	Purple Heart		
2nd row	World War I Victory Medal w/ one silver service star to denote credit for the Aisne, Aisne-Marne, St. Mihiel, Meuse-Argonne and Defensive Sector battle clasps.		Army of Occupation of Germany Medal	Asiatic-Pacific Campaign Medal w/one bronze service star for the Consolidation of Northern Solomons campaign
3nd row	World War II Victory Medal		Médaille militaire (French Republic)	Croix de guerre 1914–1918 w/two bronze palms and one silver star (French Republic)
4th row	Croce al Merito di Guerra (Italy)		Medal for Military Bravery (Kingdom of Montenegro)	Sea Gallantry Medal. (Great Britain)
Unit Award	French Fourragère – Authorized permanent wear based on three French Croix de Guerre with Palm unit citations awarded the 9th Infantry Regiment for Chateau-Thierry, Aisne-Marne and Meuse-Argonne			

== See also ==
- List of Medal of Honor recipients
- List of Medal of Honor recipients for World War I
