= Dussen Castle =

Castle in North-Brabant, Netherlands

- Kasteel Dussen
- Dussen, North-Brabant, Netherlands
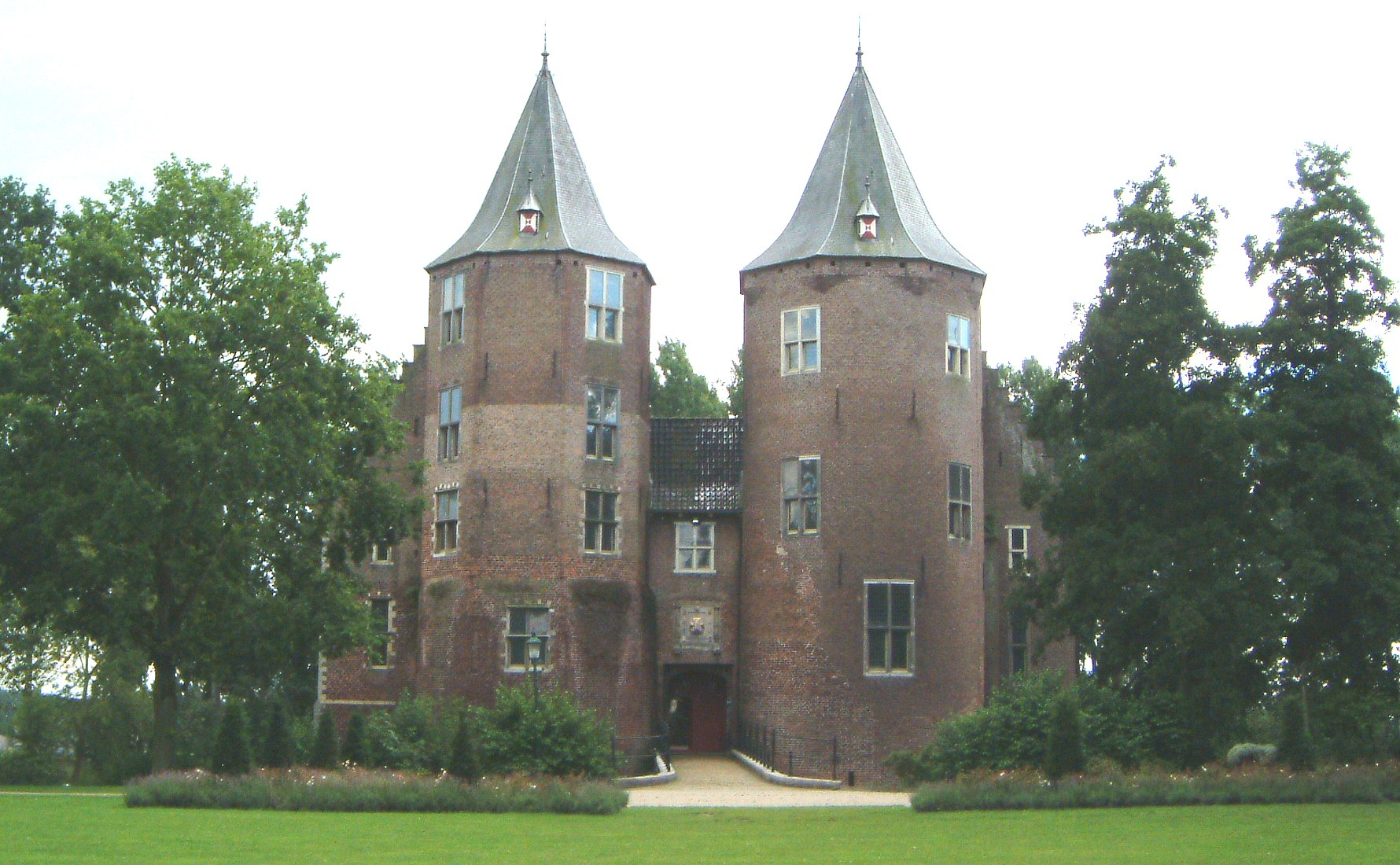
- Dussen Castle in 2007

Site information
- Type: water castle
- Open to the public: For events and meetings

Location
- The Netherlands
- Location within North Brabant
- Coordinates: 51.734101°N 4.969568°E

Site history
- Built: 14th century

Garrison information
- Designations: national monument 14202

Dussen Castle is a water castle that got its peculiar form after being destroyed by the St. Elizabeth's flood of 1421.

== History ==
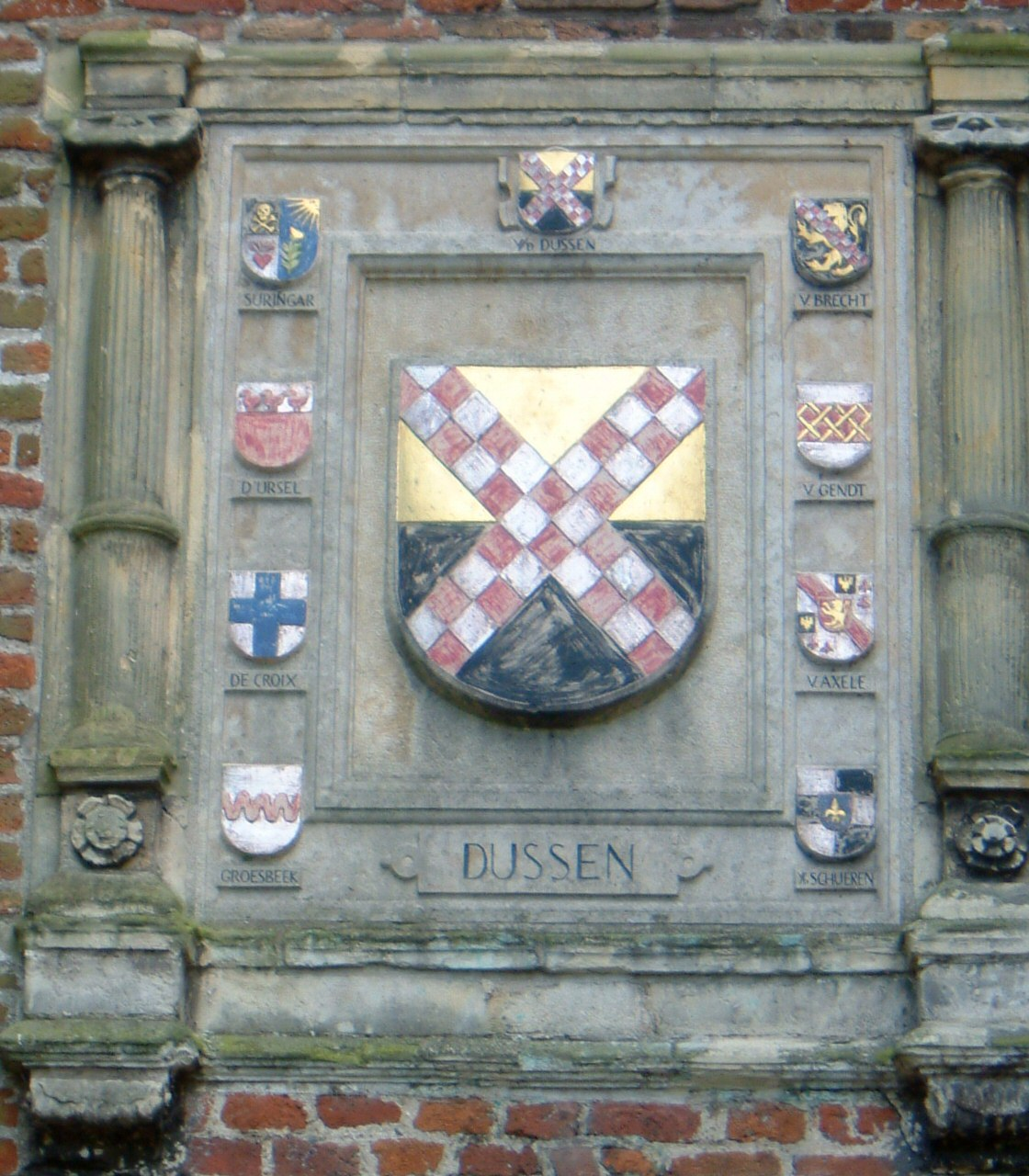
The arms of the inhabitants on the castle wall

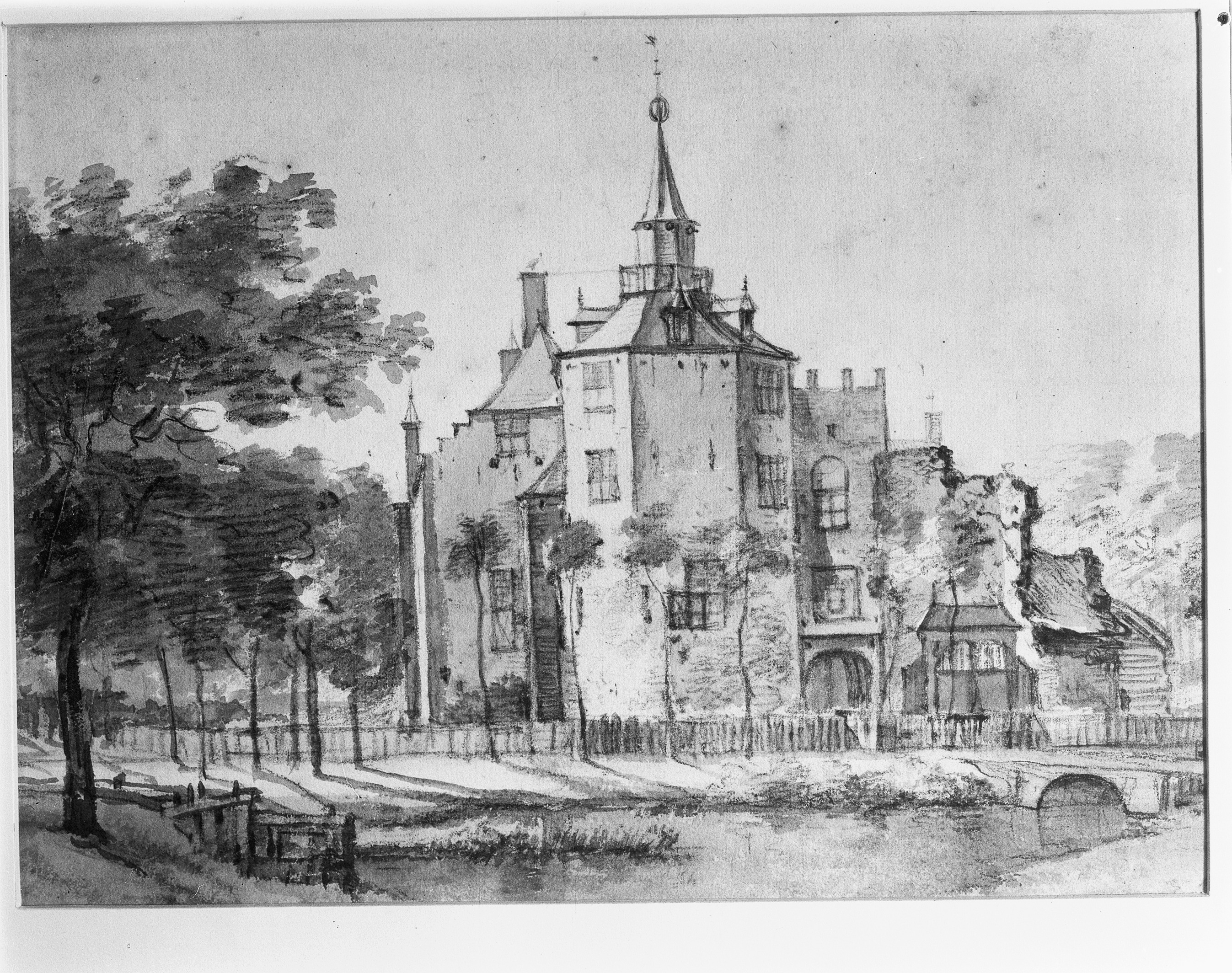
17th century from the north

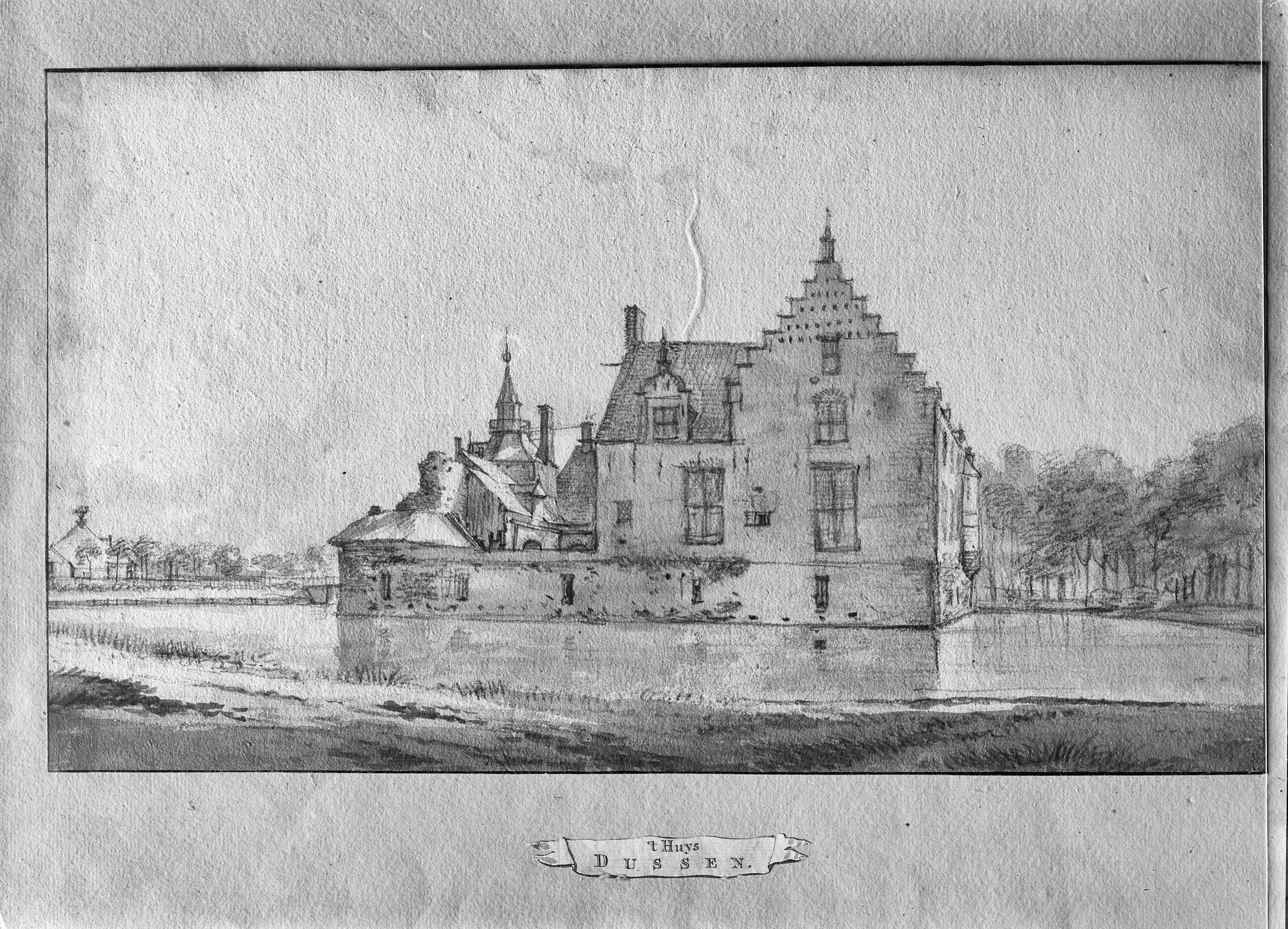
17th century from the west

=== The Lords of Dussen appear ===
The Lords of Dussen were first mentioned in 1156. The lordship heerlijkheid Dussen was first mentioned in 1200. In 1288 a Jan van Dussen fought on the Brabant side in the Battle of Worringen. He broke his leg, as told by Jan van Heelu:

Daer leet groot ongemac,
Her Jan van Dunse,
die daer brac,
Sijn been met ongevalle.

Translation:

There, he suffered great distress,
Lord Jan van Dussen,
Who there broke,
His leg in an accident.

It is possible that these Lords already had a kind of castle, but no remains of such supposed castles have been found.

=== Dussen Castle is built ===
The first version of Dussen Castle had a lone square tower built in or before 1330. It probably had auxiliary buildings on a bailey but no remains of these have been found.

In a 1387 Dussen Castle's owner Arent van der Dussen was authorized by his liege lord Albert I, Duke of Bavaria (1336-1404) to: 'make and build our house on our manor at Dussen as big and strong as he likes.' This makes it most likely that the castle gained the current floor plan in the six years following 1387.

=== Conflict between Brabant and Holland ===
The Land van Altena and Dussen had become a Brabant loan in 1200. That is, for the part held in loan by the Counts of Holland. In 1213 Holland gained Geertruidenberg. In 1230 the count of Holland strengthened his position when Dirk II van Altena paid homage for his lands in Giessendam and Dordrecht, and for Altena Castle near Almkerk. In 1356 Arent II van Dussen got the Heerlijkheid Hagoort on loan from Joanna, Duchess of Brabant. In 1357 the whole conflict about lands of Heusden and Altena was ended when Heusden was allotted to Holland.

=== The Hook and Cod Wars ===
In 1371 Arent II van Dussen joined William I van Brederode and other knights to support Wenceslaus I, Duke of Luxembourg as Duke of Brabant against William II, Duke of Jülich. This led to the lost August 1371 Battle of Baesweiler, where he was taken prisoner. His ransom was actually higher than that for Willem van Brederode.

In 1381 Arent II van Dussen got some goods on loan from his nephew Jan van Polanen, amongst them a farm hoeve lands in Muikerk. In 1387, 1392, and 1408 Arent II was mentioned as Bailiff of the southern part of the County of Holland.

During the Hook and Cod wars Arent initially sided with the Lord of Altena, Willem VI of Horne, who lost the Land van Altena. In 1396 Arent II took part in the War for East Friesland. A war that was probably waged to mark the new unity of Holland. He served Duke Albert of Bavaria with 10 men for his own account.

In 1417 Arent III became Lord of Dussen after he got it from his older brother Nicolaas, son of Arent II. In 1421, the St. Elizabeth's flood broke the dikes of the Grote Hollandse Waard and flooded it. It also flooded the Land van Altena and destroyed Dussen Castle.

=== Dussen Castle is rebuilt ===
From 1422 till 1467 the dikes around the Land van Altena were restored. In 1456 Jan V became Lord of Dussen. He seems to have restored the castle between 1473 and 1474, but in a different form. In 1497 he was succeeded by Floris van Dussen. In 1509 Jan VI (?-1535) van Dussen succeeded.

=== Van Brecht ===
In 1536 Cornelia van Dussen (?-1558) succeeded her brother Jan VI 1536. Her second husband was Godfried van Brecht, Lord of Baillevy. They were first succeeded by their sons. In 1585 Johan van Brecht got the loan. In 1593 his son Jacob van Brecht got Dussen, but he was drowned near Dole in what was then part of Burgundy. Therefore Johan's sister Anna got Dussen in 1604. Anna married Hendrik of Cartenstein. In 1607 she sold Dussen Castle and other goods to Walraven van Gendt.

=== Van Gendt ===
Walraven Baron of Gendt (c. 1580-1644) was the son of Johan Baron van Gendt (1530-1613) lord of Oyen and Dieden. Walraven had a long career in the Dutch and Brandenburg army. He fought in the 1600 Battle of Nieuwpoort. At his death in 1664 he was governor of Rees. In 1607 Walraven bought Dussen castle. He is said to have rebuilt the castle from the ground up. In 1620 Walraven sold Ooijen to Johan Sigismund Kettler (c. 1570-1659).

=== Van Axel and Verschuren ===
On 14 February 1628 Eduard van Axel dit Jacot bought the Heerlijkheid Dussen, Munsterkerk and Aartswaarde from Walraven. He was a rich man from Alkmaar, and was invested with the loan on 17 May 1628. Van Axel knew about creating polders. He probably bought Dussen for such purpose, because it had a claim to many lands outside the dikes. On 8 September 1657 Maarten Jacot van Axel became lord. On his death Dussen Castle came to Eduard François van der Schuren van Hagoort, his uncle, in 1682. In 1692 his brother Jean Louis Verchuren followed. In 1727 his daughter Elisabeth inherited Dussen Castle.

=== Counts of Groesbeeck ===
In 1727 Elisabeth married Alexander Coutte Count of Groesbeeck. In 1734 their son Jean François Coutte inherited Dussen Castle. In 1758 he was succeeded by his sister Marie Anne. She had married A.L.F. de Croix Marques of Heuchin, Count of Bucquoy (1725-). The Croix family did not live at Dussen.

=== Marquess de Croix ===
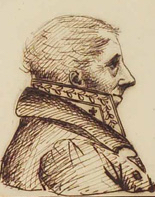
C.L.M. Marquis de Croix

In 1763 Alexander Eugène Marquess of Croix, son of Marie Anne succeeded to Dussen. In 1766 he was in turn succeeded by his brother Charles-Lidewine-Marie de Croix (1760-1832). Charles Lidewine was Pair of France. He was married to Augustine Eugenie Victoire de Vassé. Their first son was Ernest Charles Eugène Marie Marques de Croix.

Charles Edmond Marie comte de Croix was the second son of Charles Lidewine. Amongst other goods, he inherited Dussen castle. Charles Edmond married Marie Amelie de Tournon Simiane. Together they got a daughter Marie Camille de Croix. She married M.A. count of Ursel. After his death she retained Dussen Castle, with land in Munsterkerk, Aartswaarde and Hagoort. In 1916 she still owned these grounds.

=== Convent ===
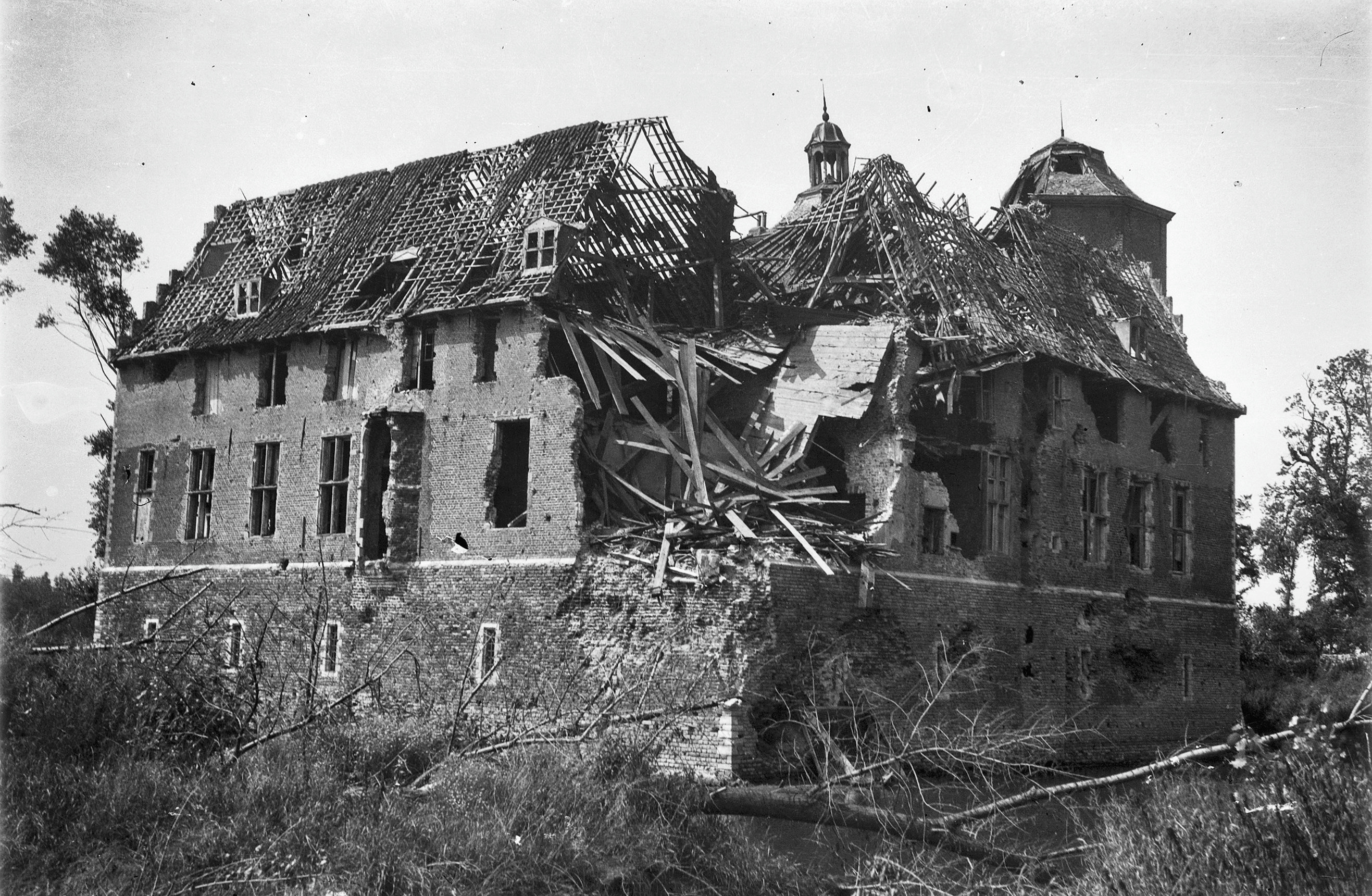
War damage

In 1901 Dussen Castle became home to the Carmelite sisters, who had been forced out of France. It remained a convent till 1920. A chapel was added for the purpose. In April 1924 Dussen Castle was offered at an auction for 10,400 guilders. It led to protests, and on request of the provincial archaeological commission, the owner added the condition that it could not be demolished. The first attempt to sell the castle failed. A new auction was organized, in which the clause against demolition was abandoned. The municipality reacted with a local order that forbade demolition of monuments. It also tried to buy it for the municipality, but the asking price was then raised.

In the end Dussen Castle was bought by Lucas Daniël Suringar from Koudekerken for 20,000 guilders. Lady Rolina Suringar was the last inhabitant. At night, she had six men from the village guard the castle. Inspired by this story the well known author Antoon Coolen wrote the novel De vrouw met de zes slapers (the lady with the six sleepers), published in 1953.

In 1931 the castle was again offered for sale after the death of Rolina Suringar. The municipality again reacted by forbidding demolition. In September 1935 the municipality decided to buy it for 15,000 guilders. After renovation, it would then become the new town hall, a museum, and house for the mayor and Veldwachter (a kind of rural police officer). It took four years till the plans became final in late 1939. The restoration was then ordered in July 1940, i.e. while the Netherlands were occupied! In August 1940 the work indeed started.

In the winter of 1944-1945 there was severe damage to the castle. From 1950 to 1953 a new renovation was done, and by September 1953 this was completed. In June 1954 Dussen Castle opened as town hall of Dussen.

In 1997 the municipality of Dussen became part of Werkendam. In 2003 Werkendam leased Dussen Castle to NV Monumenten Fonds Brabant (MFB), now Monumentenbeheer Brabant (MBB). In 2013 Werkendam transferred the castle to Landgoed Brabant B.V., a 100% participation of MBB. The foundation Stichting Vrienden Kasteel Dussen is important for organizing social and cultural activities at the castle. It is also used for weddings.

== The Castle ==
=== The current castle ===
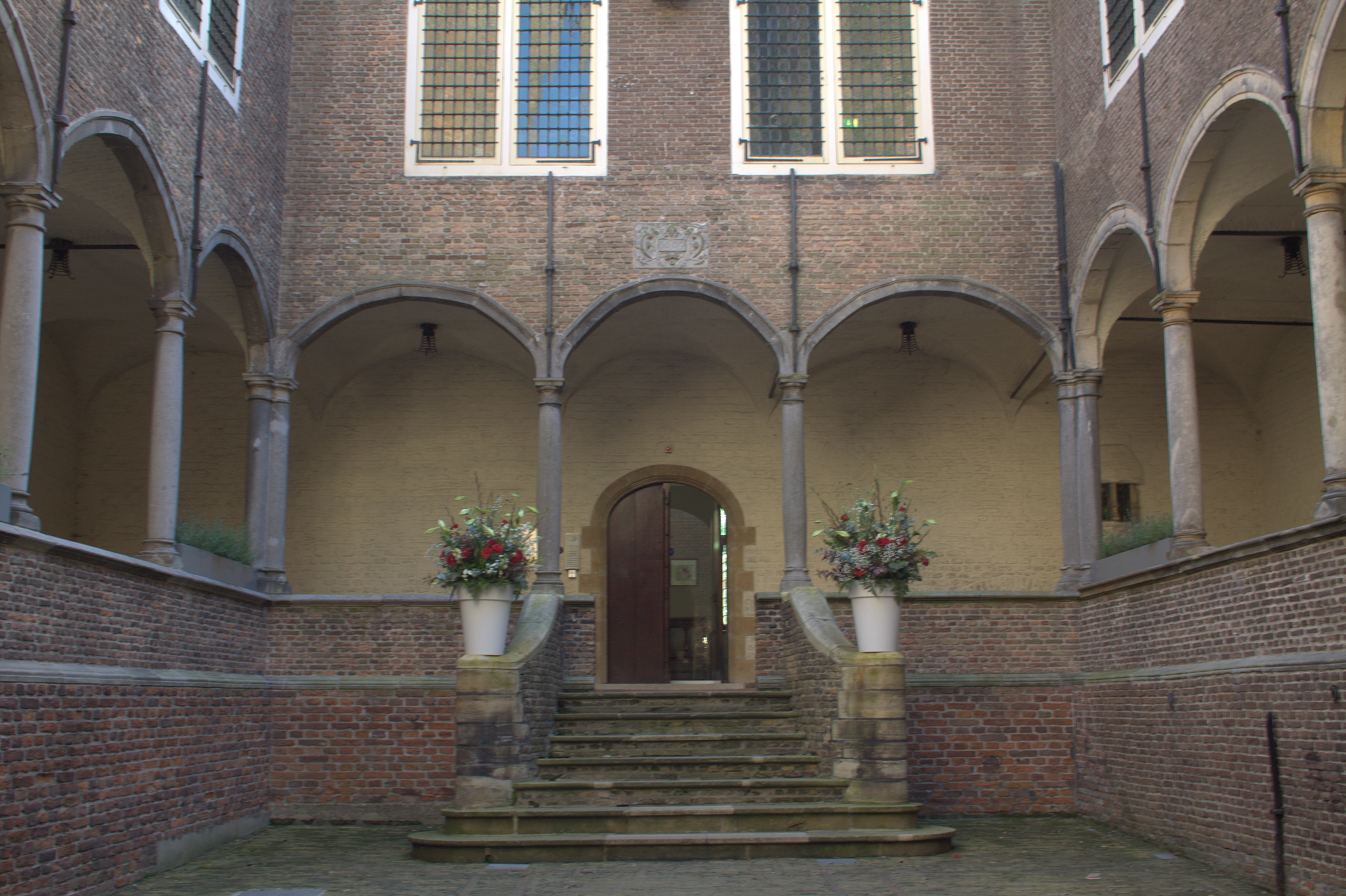
The Tuscan gallery

The castle is located just north of the small river Dussen, which used to flow north of the castle before 1421. The towers and gate are in the northern wing. The castle looks like a renaissance building with two protruding medieval towers. It has an inner court surrounded by a Tuscan gallery.

The form is strange, because of the placement of the heavy towers. In fact the towers, and the part below the level of the inner court date from before the 1421 flood. The flood, and supposed looting of brick, brought heavy destruction to the castle. When reconstruction started in 1470, everything above the three(?) meter thick basement walls was removed. Only the towers at the entrance were left alone. Next low wings were constructed around an open courtyard.

During the Eighty Years' War, the castle suffered again. The renovation by Van Gendt led to heightening the 1470 wings with one floor, and the construction of the Tuscan gallery, marked by the 1609 commemorative plaque. This was probably also the time that the eastern tower was heightened. Still, the courtyard remained open on the northwestern side, see the 17th century drawings. Between 1672 and 1714 the northwestern wing was closed, and the western tower was restored and heightened. This was also the time that a small tower was built above the gate. This was destroyed in World War II, and not restored.

=== A reconstruction of the pre-1421 castle ===
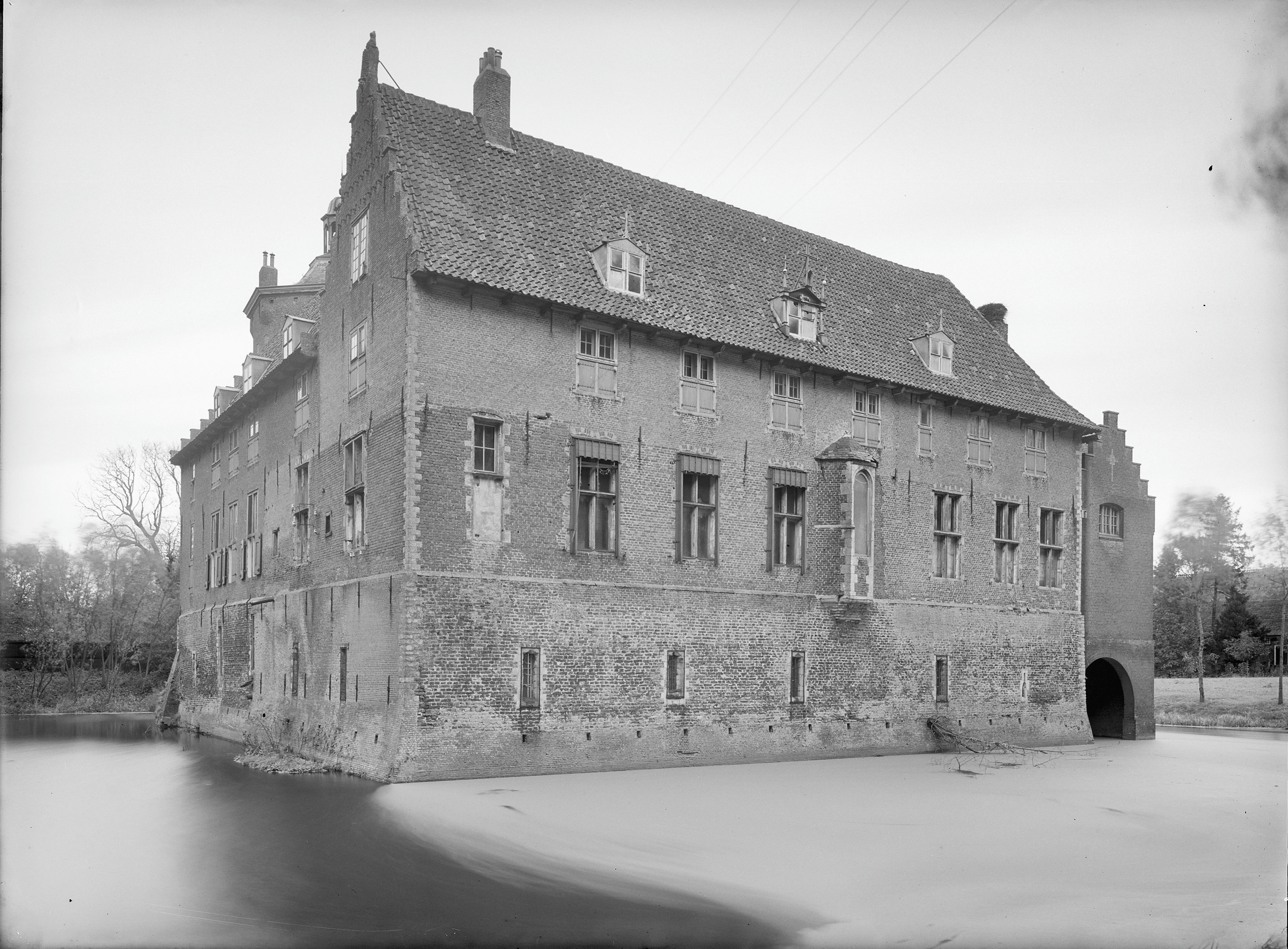
Southern wing in 1935

The form of Dussen Castle is very peculiar, because it is a water castle with two towers in the center of one wing, instead of on the corners. Therefore, many have wondered about the earliest form of the castle. The archaeologist Jaap Renaud assumed that all the old parts of the castle dated from the 1387 construction campaign. He had two grounds for this supposition. First was that he only had the 1387 charter above. The second reason was that while walking around the castle in about 1943, he could not find any vertical construction joint (bouwvoeg), which is normally created when a building is extended.

Later the oldest outer wall was found in the basement. Also, a 1331 charter was found, which spoke of a House of Van der Dussen. An old genealogy also interprets the 1387 charter as leading to changing the Dussen house to a castle. The final blow to Renaud's theory are the two embrasures in the southeast corner of the square floor plan, see 1935 photo. These differ from all the other small windows at the base level, and are also present in older pictures. The conclusion is that the first version of the castle was a keep / tower house, dated to about 1330, the base of which is now included in the southeastern corner of the castle. Archaeologist Jaap Ypey (1916-1986) then made a picture or impression of how the castle might have looked before the 1421 flood.
