= Dussen =

- Village
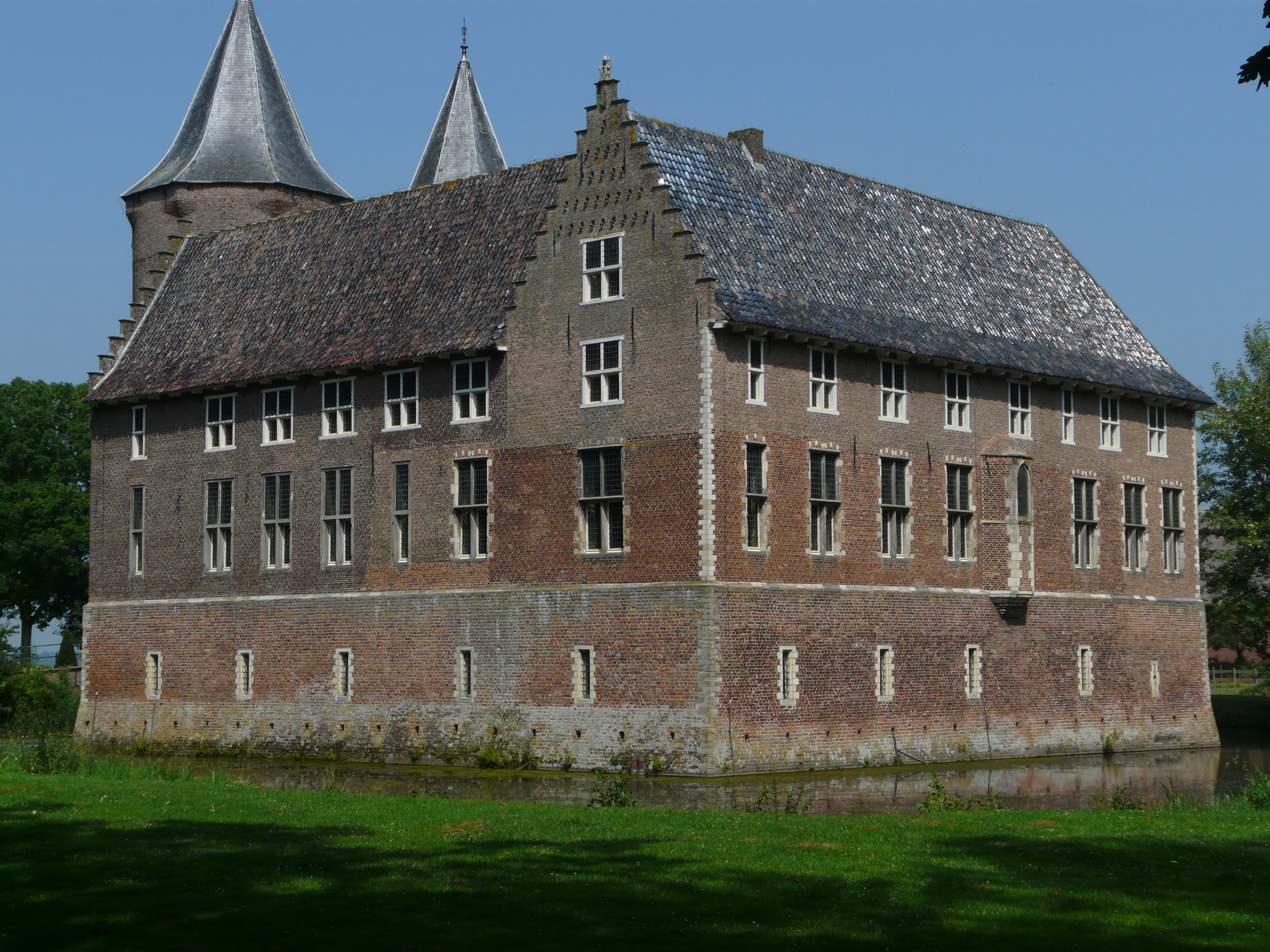
- Dussen Castle

- Flag Coat of arms

- Location in the province of North Brabant in the Netherlands Dussen (Netherlands)
- Coordinates: 51°44′N 4°58′E
- Country: Netherlands
- Province: North Brabant
- Municipality: Altena

Area
  - Total: 14.45 km^{2} (5.58 sq mi)
- Elevation: 2.4 m (7.9 ft)

Population (2021)
  - Total: 2,525
  - Density: 174.7/km^{2} (452.6/sq mi)
- Time zone: UTC+1 (CET)
  - Summer (DST): UTC+2 (CEST)
- Postal code: 4271
- Dialing code: 0416

Dussen is a village in the Dutch province of North Brabant. It is a part of the municipality of Altena, and is located about 12 km south of Gorinchem. Dussen Castle is located near the village.

== History ==
The village was first mentioned in 1156 as Iacobus de Dussan, and has been named after a distributary of the Meuse. The etymology of the river is clear. Dussen was destroyed by the St. Elizabeth's flood of 1421. In the late-15th century, the land was reclaimed by poldering. It was flooded again in 1892 and severely damaged in 1944 and 1945 during World War II.

Dussen Castle was built during the 14th century. In 1421, it was destroyed by a flood, and rebuilt about 50 years later. It was severely damaged by Spanish troops during Eighty Years' War, and restored in 1608. Between 1901 and 1922, it served as a monastery, and in 1935 as town hall. In 1945, it was damaged again and restored between 1946 and 1953. The square tower above the gate was not rebuilt. In 1953, it was once again used as town hall. Since 1997, it is used for weddings and cultural activities.

Dussen was home to 1,378 people in 1840. The Dutch Reformed church was not rebuilt after World War II. The Catholic church was rebuilt in 1953 in pre-fab steel and concrete which was unusual at the time. It is built slightly elevated to be able to withstand floods. In 2021, it was converted into 20 apartments.

Dussen was a separate municipality until 1997, when it was merged with Werkendam. Before 1908, the name of the municipality was "Dussen, Munster en Muilkerk".

== Notable people ==
- Henri Karel Frederik van Teijn (1839–1892) a Dutch general, civil and military governor of Aceh and Dependencies
- Louis van Iersel (1893–1987) a sergeant in US Army in WWI, earned the highest military decoration for valour in combat — the Medal of Honor

== Gallery ==
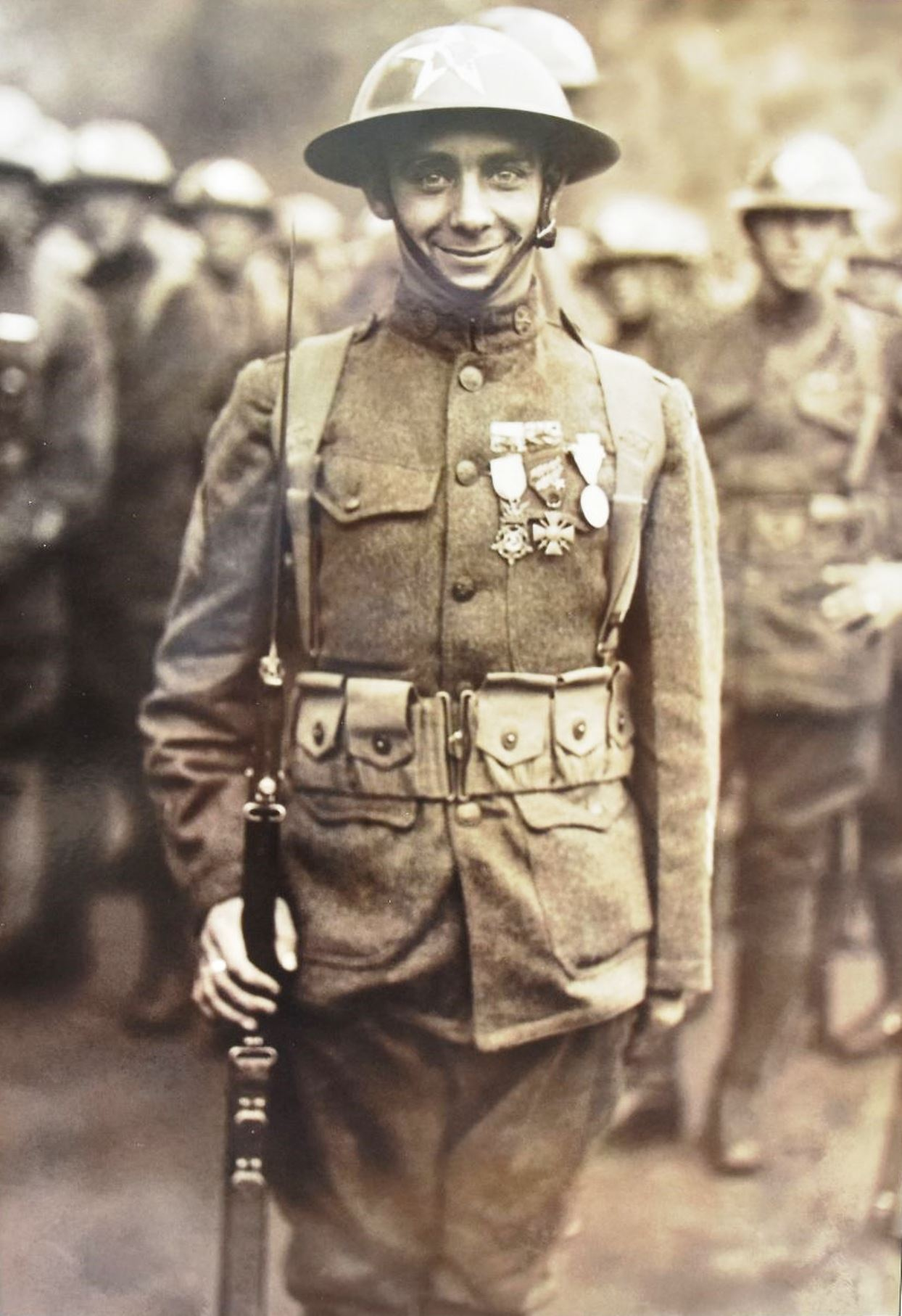
Ludovicus M. M. Van Iersel, 1919

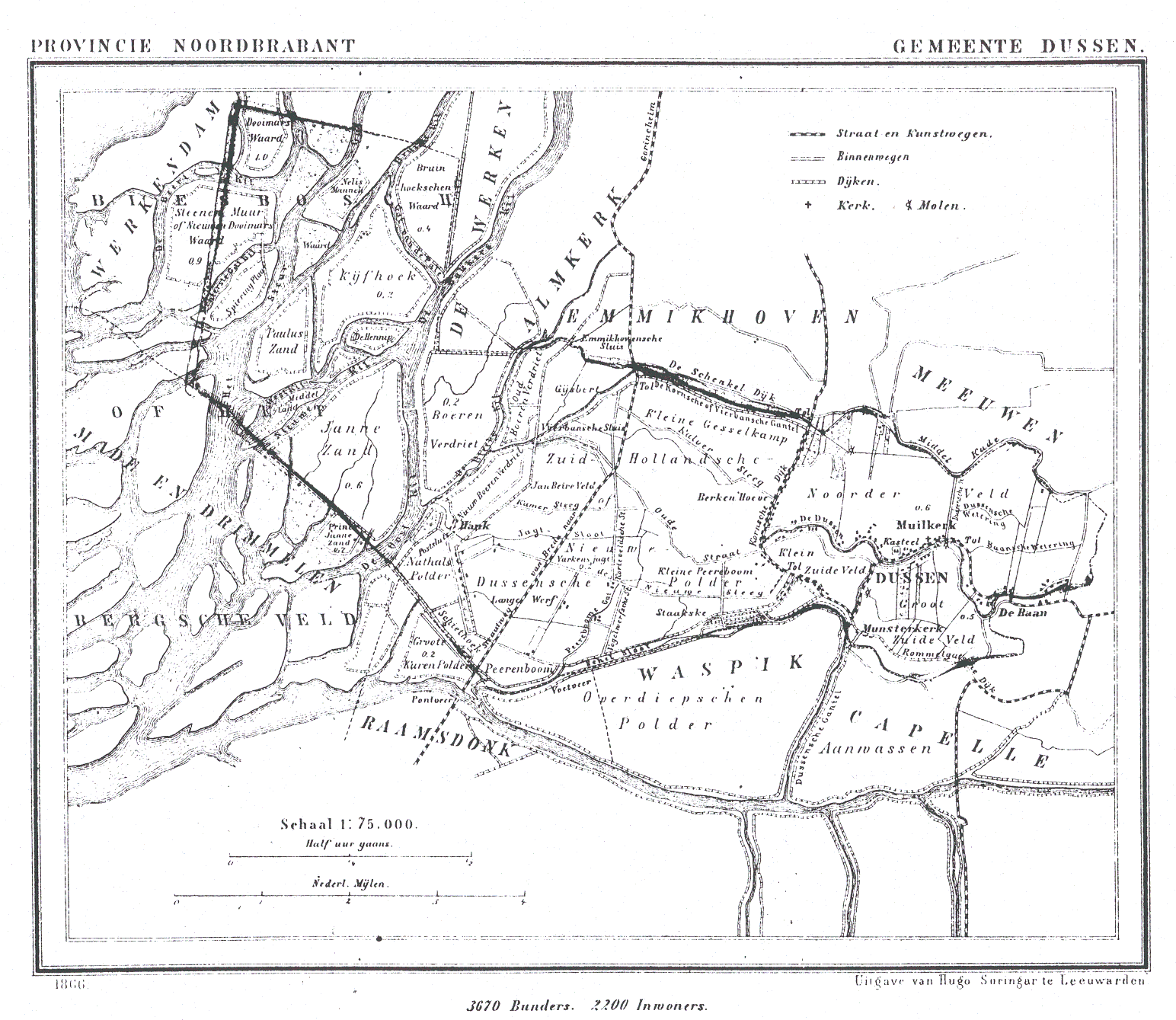
Dussen in 1866

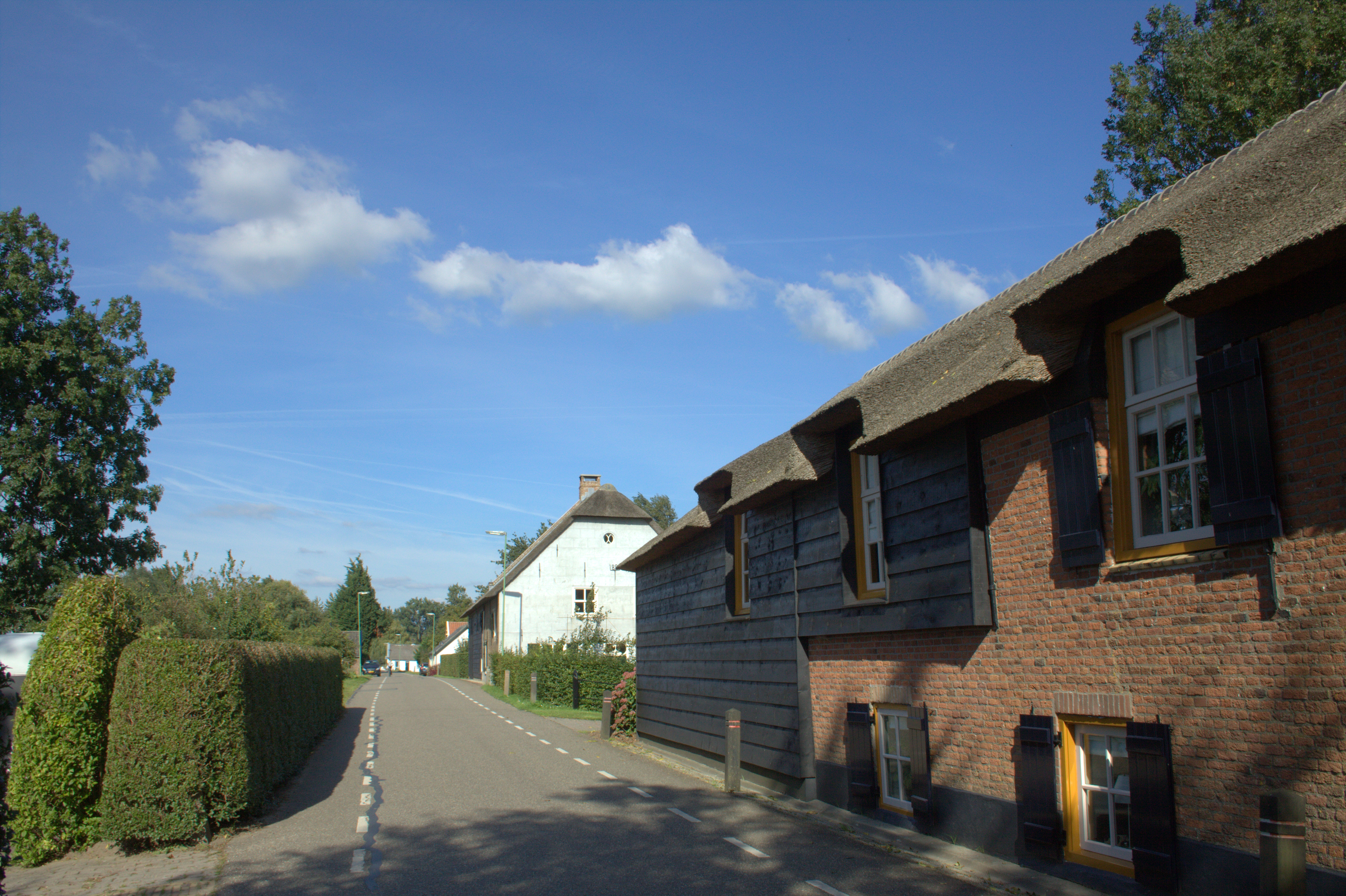
Village view

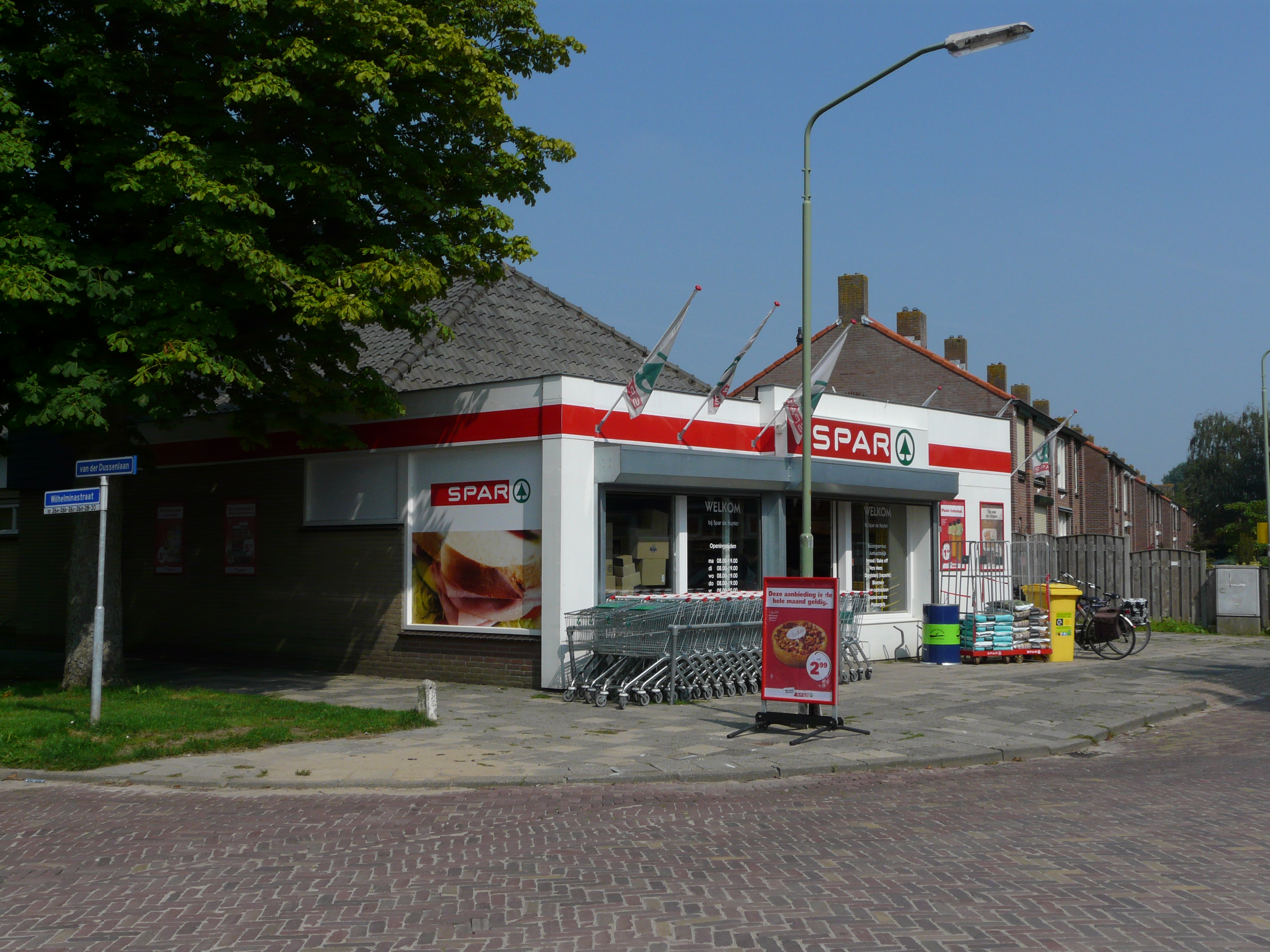
Supermarket
