= Reeuwijk-Brug =

- Village
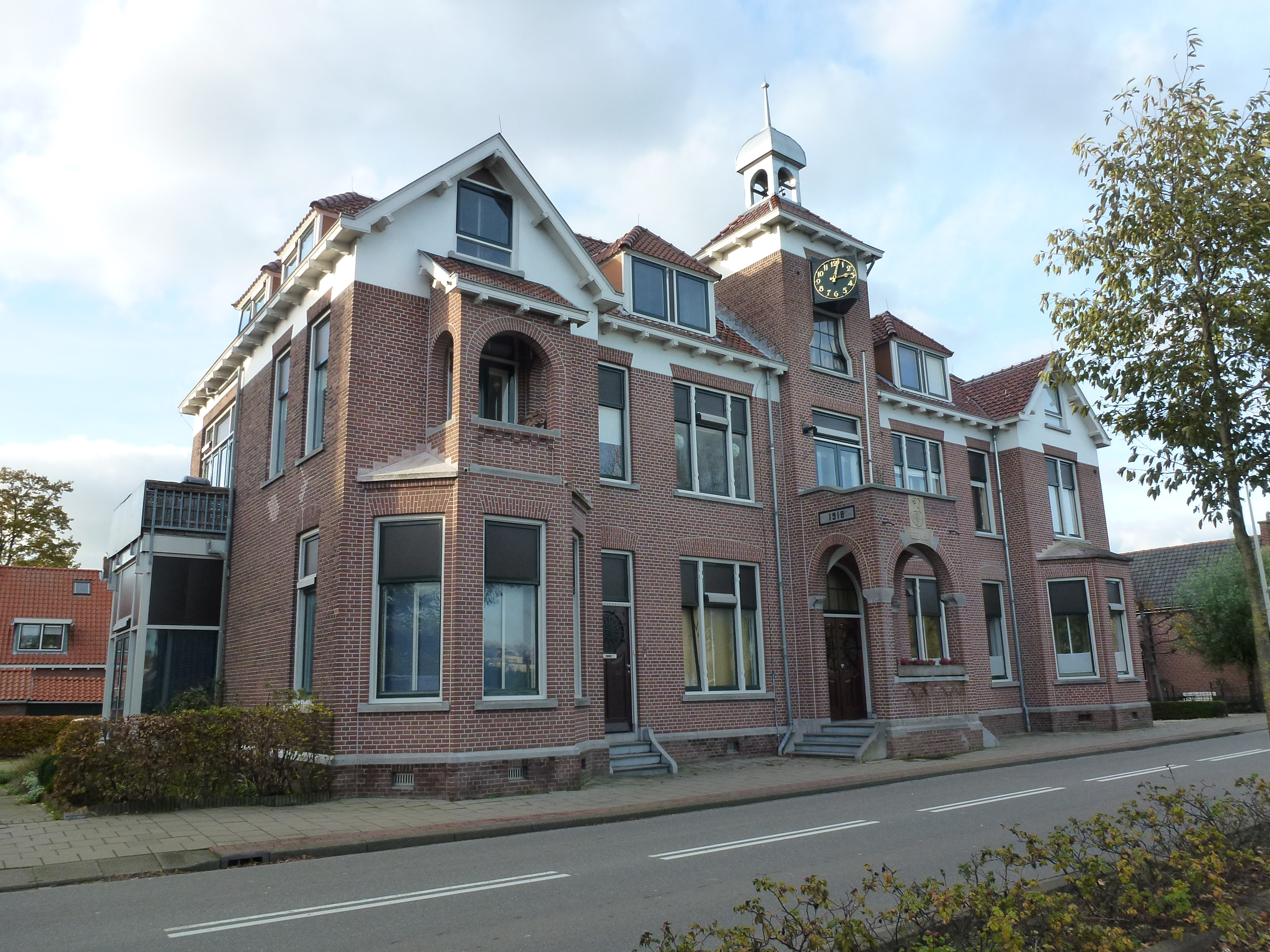
- Former town hall

- Location in the province of South Holland in the Netherlands Location in the Netherlands
- Coordinates: 52.0467°N 4.7239°E
- Country: Netherlands
- Province: South Holland
- Municipality: Bodegraven-Reeuwijk

Area
  - Total: 23.64 km^{2} (9.13 sq mi)
- Elevation: −1.5 m (−4.9 ft)

Population (2021)
  - Total: 8,560
  - Density: 362/km^{2} (938/sq mi)
- Time zone: UTC+1 (CET)
  - Summer (DST): UTC+2 (CEST)
- Postal code: 2811
- Dialing code: 0182

Reeuwijk-Brug is a village in the municipality of Bodegraven-Reeuwijk in the province of South Holland, the Netherlands.

Reeuwijk-Brug is a stretched out peat excavation village from the Middle Ages which was later developed from Reeuwijk-Dorp. The Dutch Reformed church is a neoclassic aisleless church from 1863 which was built as a replacement of the 16th century church. The former town hall with bell tower was built in 1918.

== Gallery ==
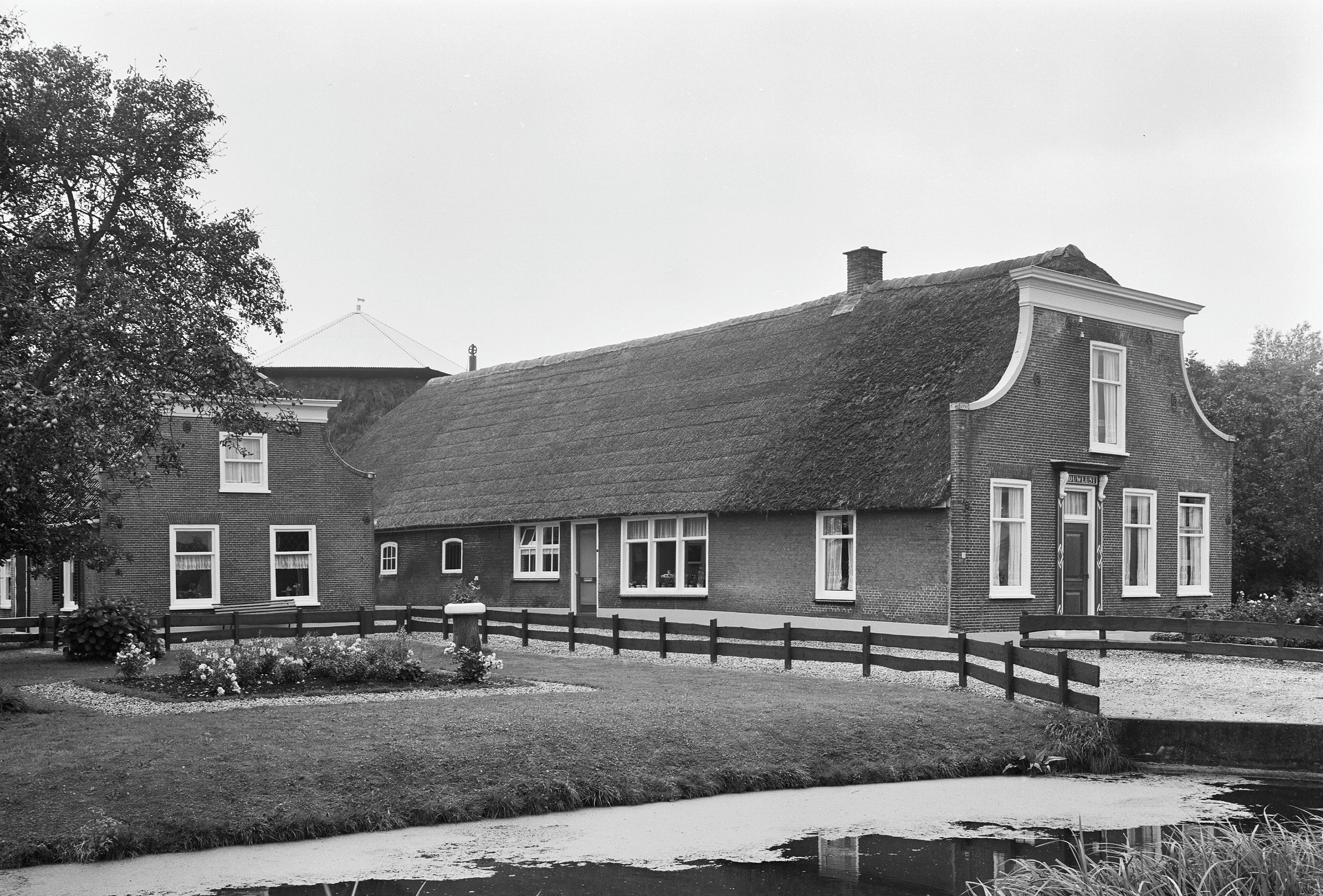

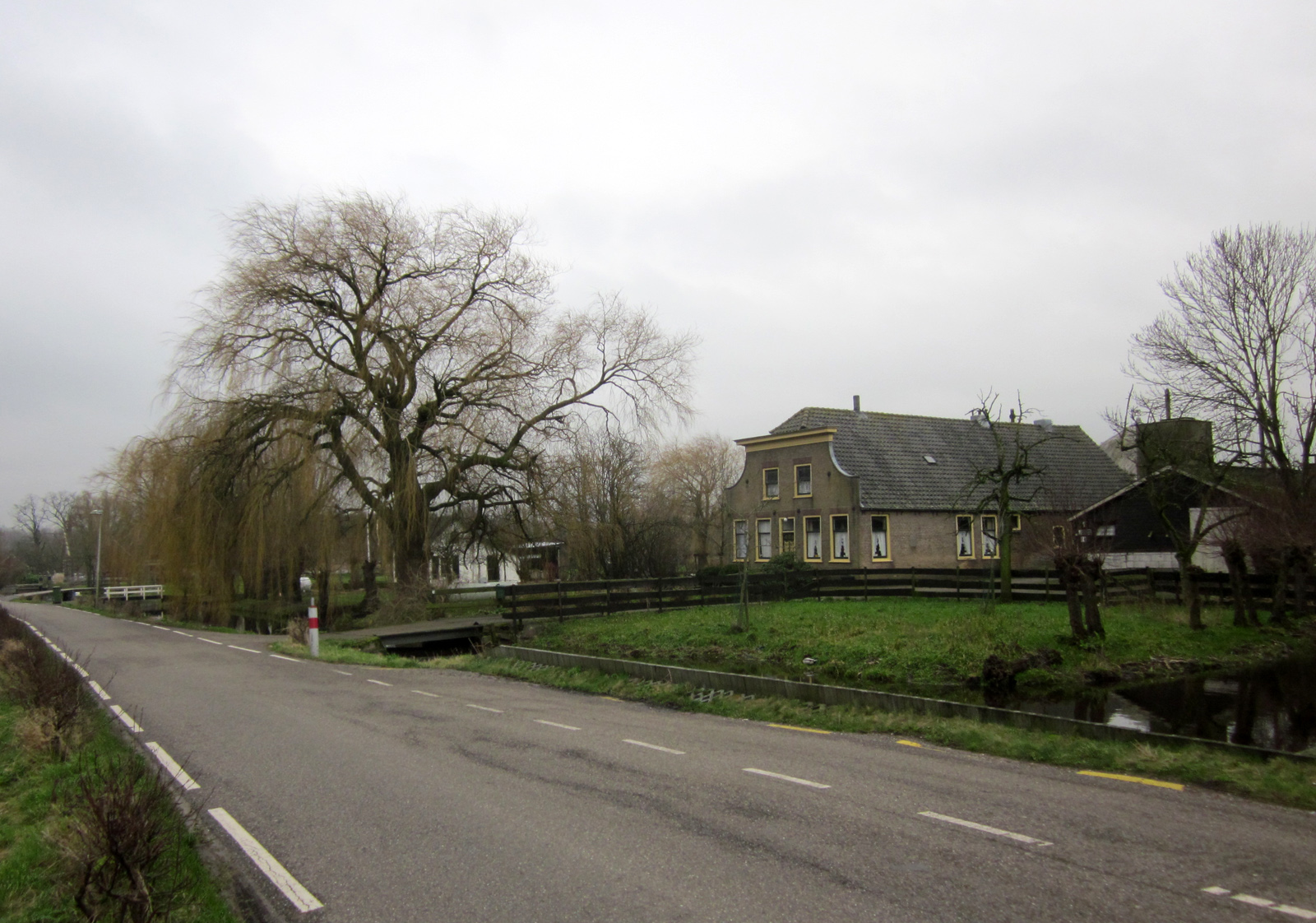
Farm in Reeuwijk-Brug

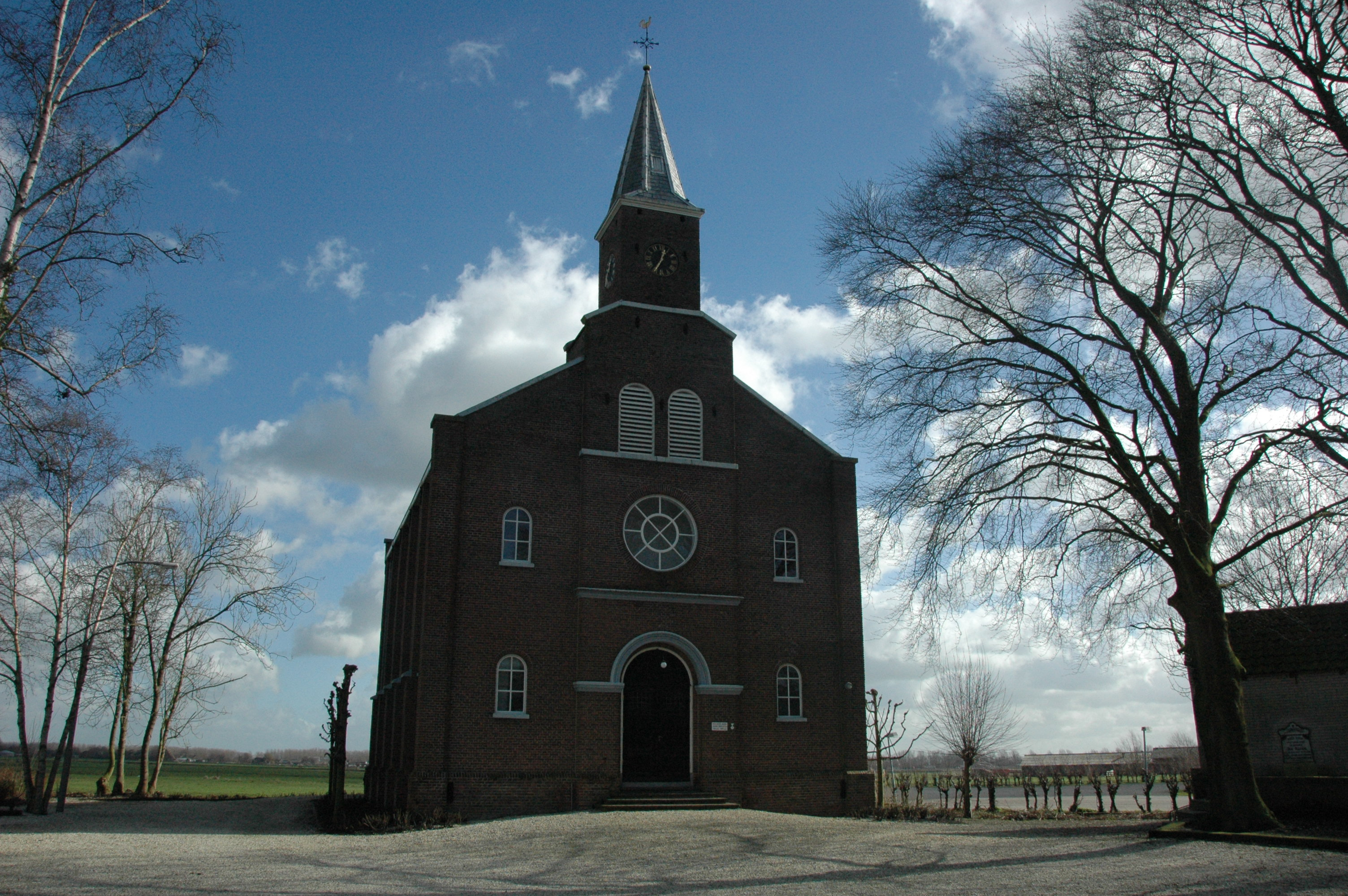
Mennonite church

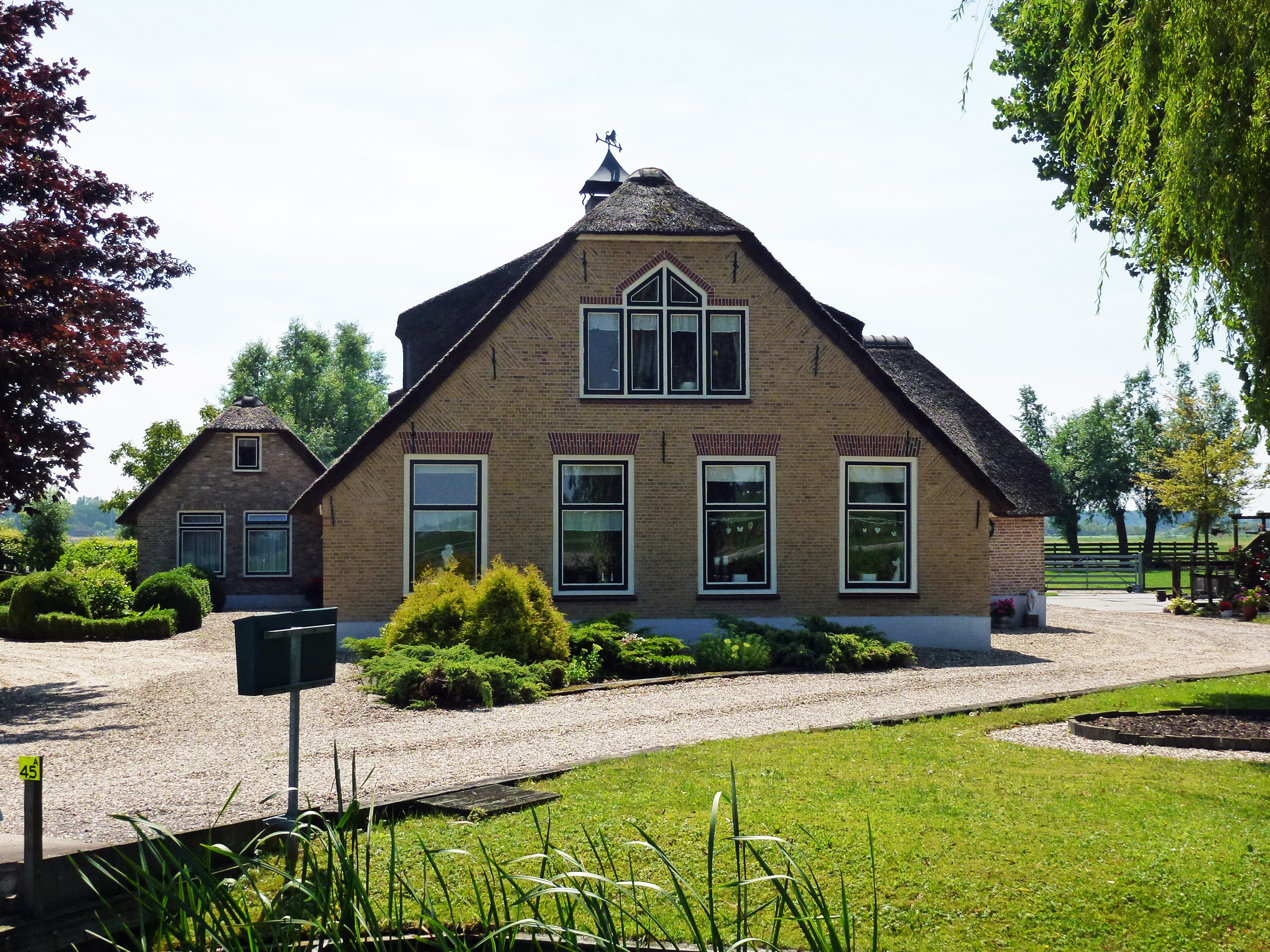
Farm in Reeuwijk-Brug
