= Krimpenerwaard =

- Municipality
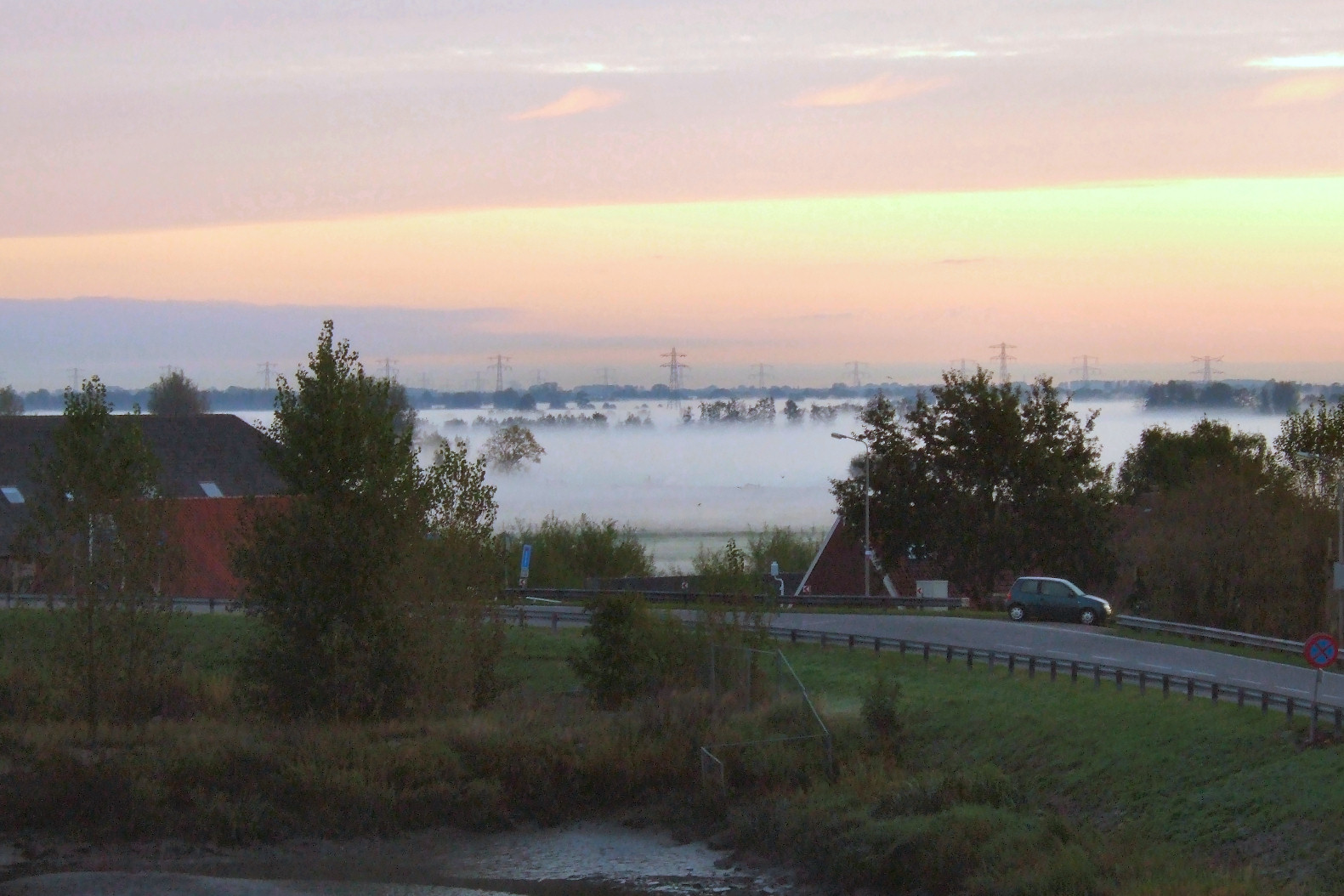
- Krimpenerwaard landscape on an October morning in 2009

- Flag Coat of arms

- Location in South Holland
- Coordinates: 51°59′N 4°47′E
- Country: Netherlands
- Province: South Holland
- Established: 1 January 2015

Government
  - Body: Municipal council
  - Mayor: Pieter Paans (VVD)
- Time zone: UTC+1 (CET)
  - Summer (DST): UTC+2 (CEST)
- Area code: 0180/0182
- Website: www.krimpenerwaard.nl

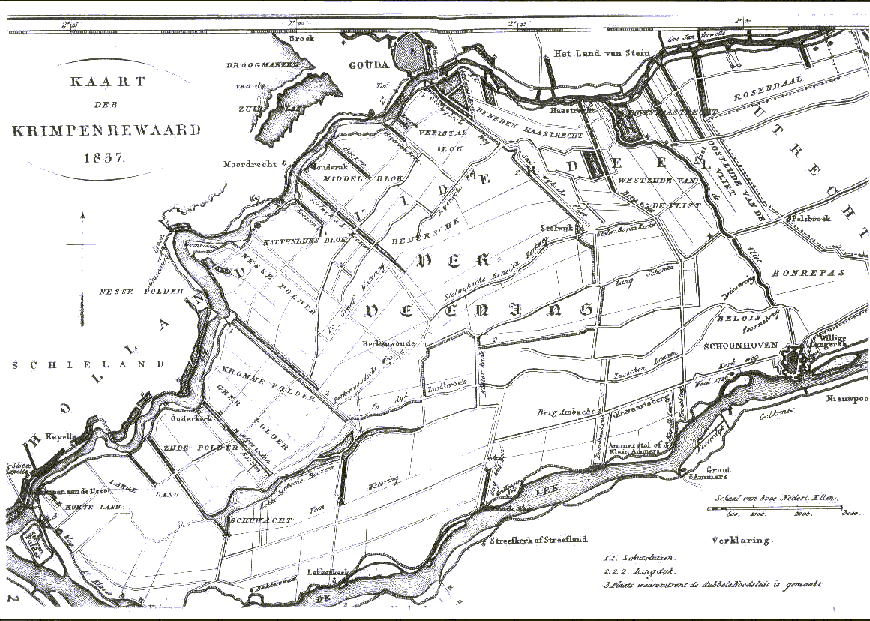
1837 map of the Krimpenerwaard

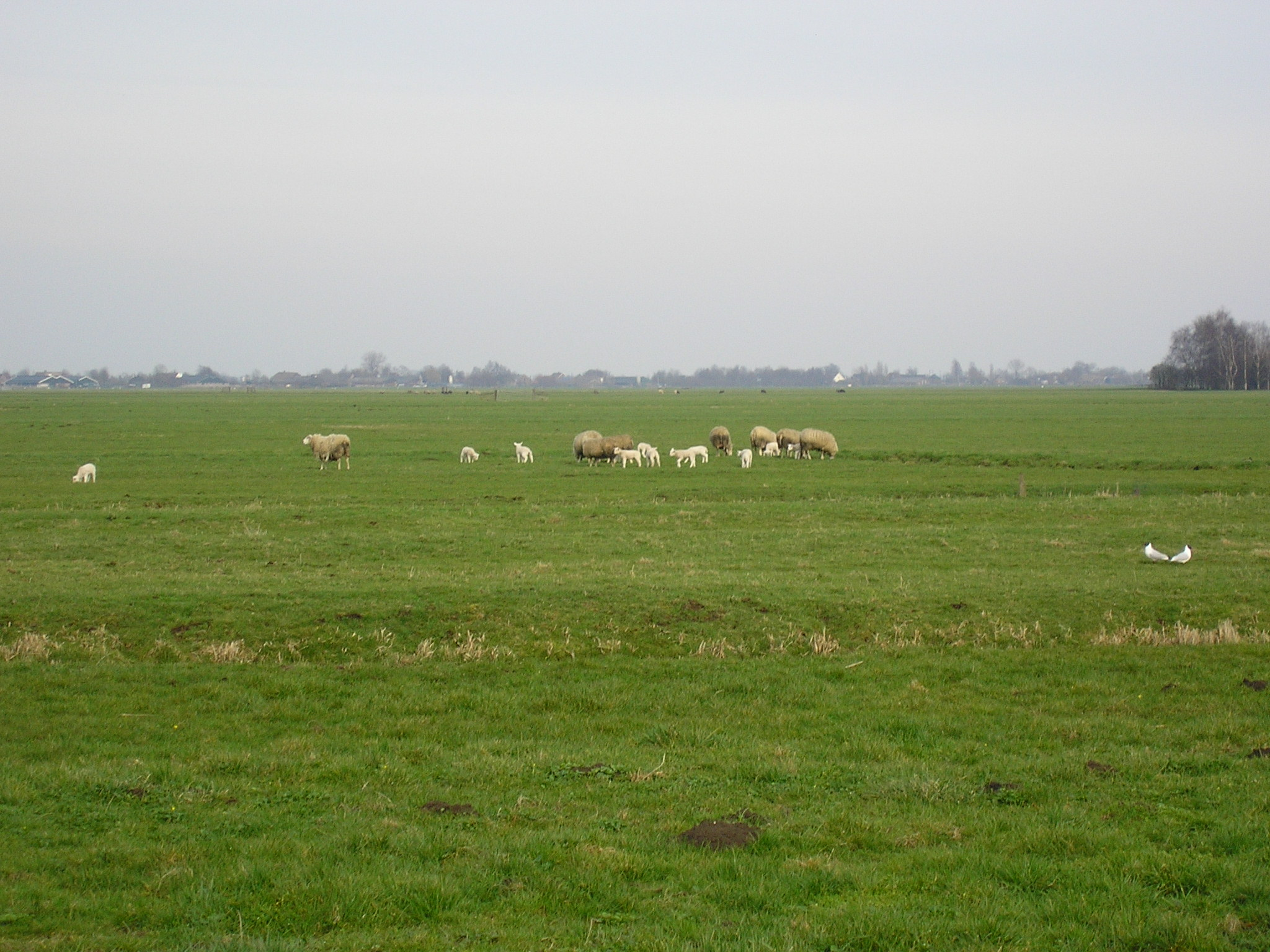
Vlist polder. The Vlist River is in the distance near the houses.

Krimpenerwaard (Dutch pronunciation: [ˈkrɪmpənərˌʋaːrt]) is a municipality, a region and a former water board of the Netherlands. It is a rural area located in the east of the province of South Holland, just south of Gouda and east of the Rotterdam conurbation. It is bordered on the north by the river Hollandse IJssel, on the south by the river Lek and on the east by the stream Vlist.

Krimpenerwaard obtains its name from the fact that "Krimp" used to mean a bend in a river and "Waard" is the Dutch word for an interfluvial area between the winter dikes of different river channels (in this case, the Lek and the Hollandse IJssel). There are other such waarden in this area. The Lopikerwaard lies to the east; the Zuidplaspolder to the west. The name Krimpenerwaard first appeared in the historical records in 944.

The municipality is named after the region Krimpenerwaard and was formed by a merger of the municipalities of Nederlek, Ouderkerk, Vlist, Bergambacht and Schoonhoven on 1 January 2015.

== Geography ==
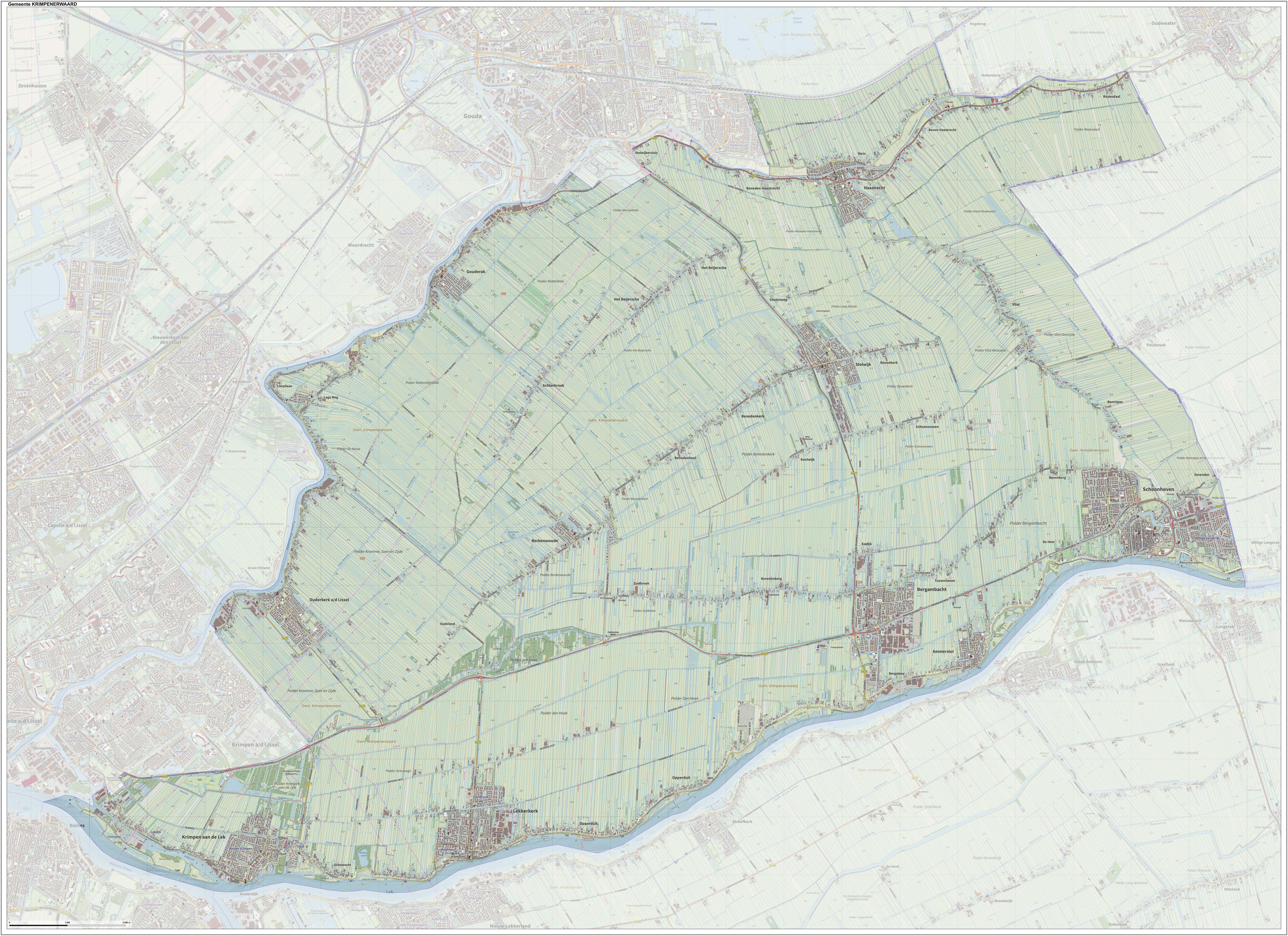
Topographic map of the municipality of Krimpenerwaard, June 2015

The towns and villages in the Krimpenerwaard are:

- Schoonhoven
- Bergambacht
- Stolwijk
- Ammerstol
- Haastrecht
- Berkenwoude
- Lekkerkerk
- Krimpen aan de Lek
- Vlist
- Gouderak
- Ouderkerk aan den IJssel

== Notable people ==
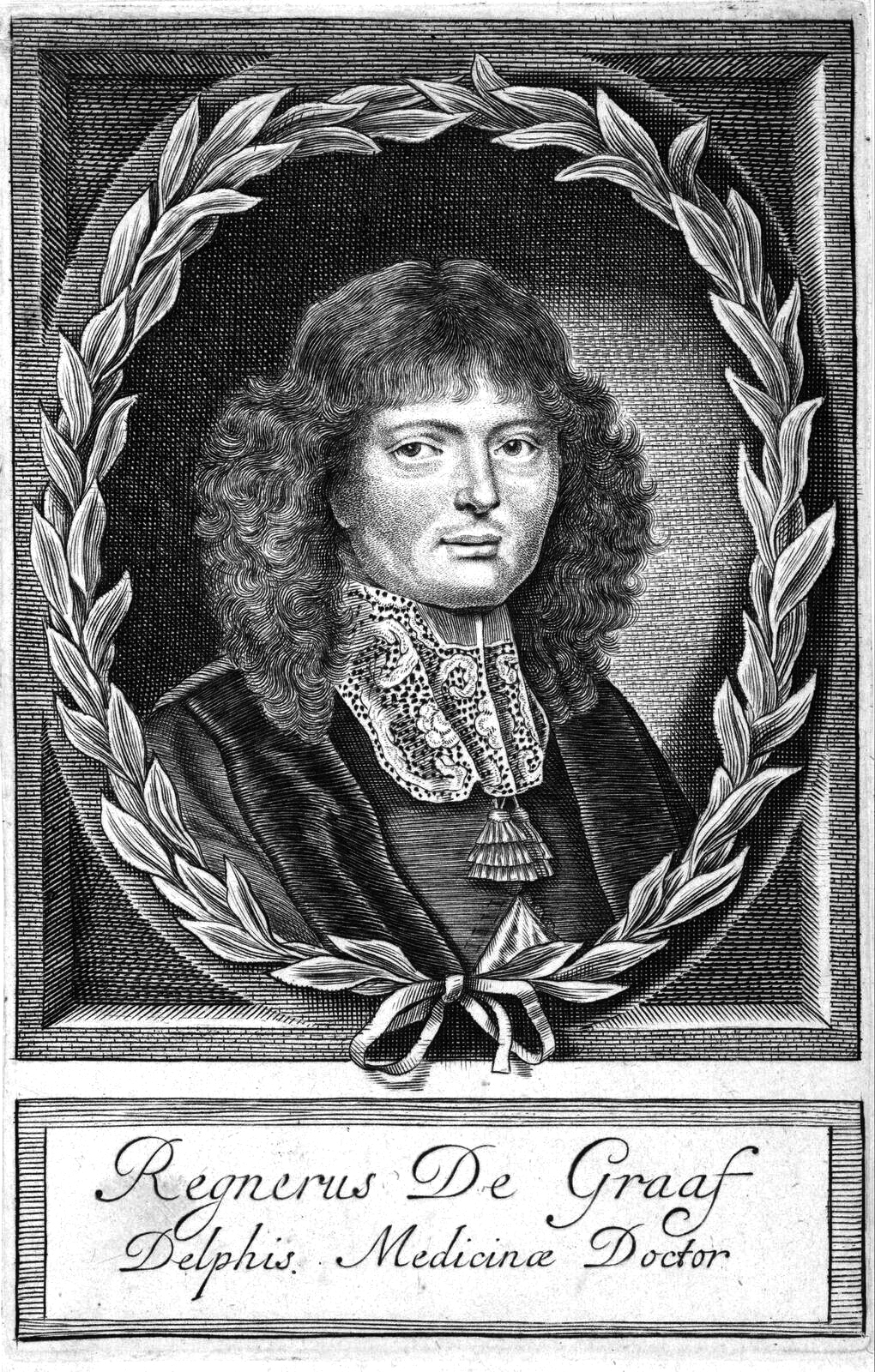
Reinier de Graaf, ca.1670

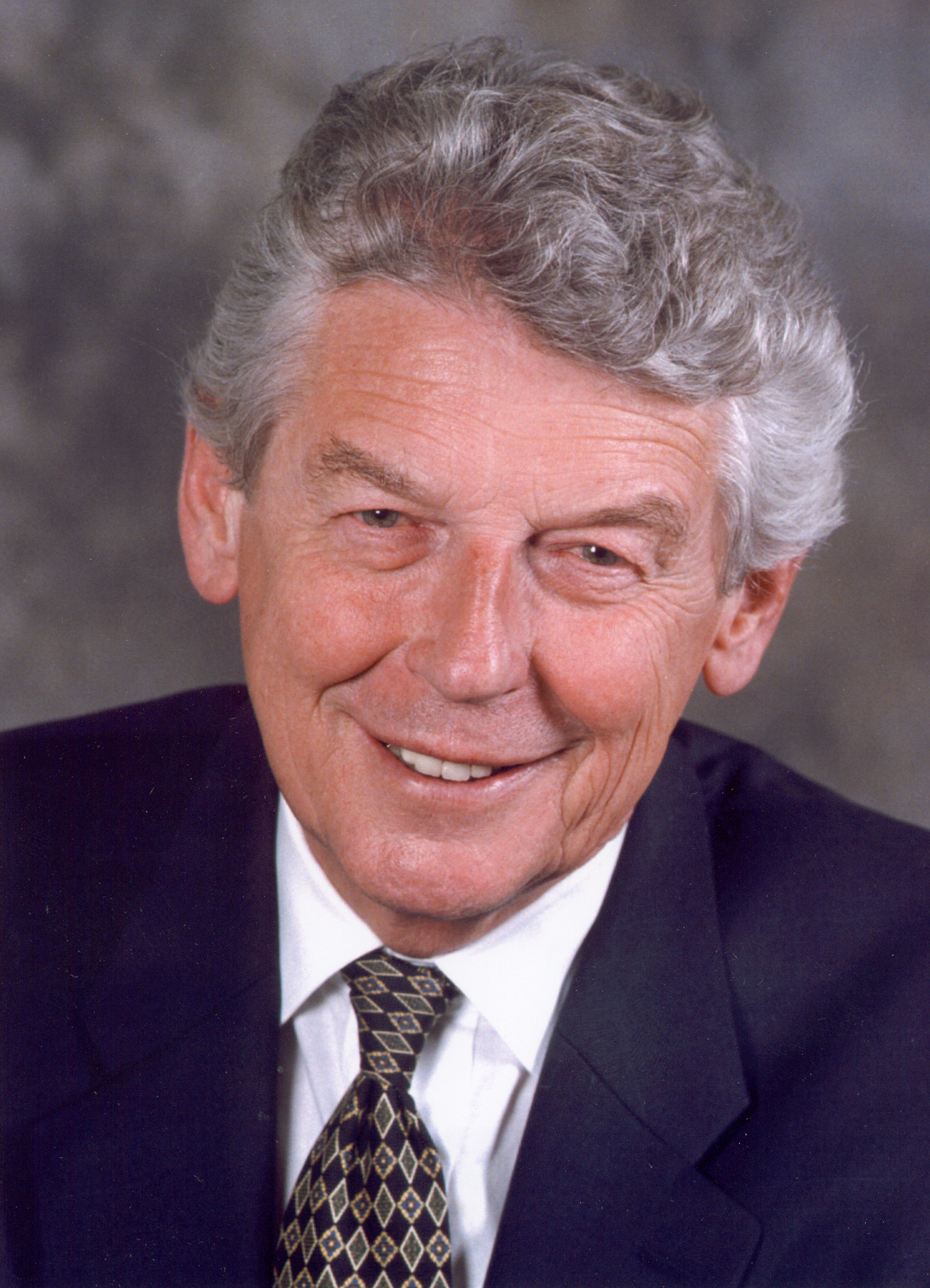
Wim Kok, 1994

- John of Schoonhoven (1356/7 in Schoonhoven – 1432) a Flemish theologian and writer
- Erasmus (c.1569-1636) – the leading intellectual and author of his time, member of a religious house at Stein in his youth
- Herman Naiwincx (1623 in Schoonhoven – 1670) a Dutch Golden Age landscape painter and printmaker
- Arnoldus Montanus (c. 1625 – 1683 in Schoonhoven) a teacher and author on theology, history and geography.
- Regnier de Graaf (1641 in Schoonhoven – 1673) a Dutch physician and anatomist who made key discoveries in reproductive biology
- Justine Constance Wirix-van Mansvelt (1876 in Schoonhoven – 1937) an expert on Dante Alighieri (1265–1321)
- Andreas Rinkel (1889 in Ouderkerk aan de Amstel – 1979) a Dutch priest and the 19th Archbishop of Utrecht from 1937 to 1970.
- Reijer Hooykaas (1906 in Schoonhoven – 1994) a Dutch historian of science
- Wim Kok (1938 in Bergambacht – 2018) a Dutch politician, Prime Minister of the Netherlands 1994 to 2002
- Marrie Bot (born 1946 in Bergambacht) a Dutch photographer and graphic designer
- Martin van Bruinessen (born 1946 in Schoonhoven) a Dutch academic, anthropologist and author
- Max van den Berg (born 1946 in Ammerstol) a Dutch politician
- Jamai Loman (born 1986) a Dutch singer, brought up in Schoonhoven

=== Sport ===
- Jan Kooiman (born 1953 in Ammerstol), former speed skater, broke the world one-hour record in 1983 (stood for 4 years)
- Jacob van der Kop (1868 in Schoonhoven – 1945) a sports shooter, competed at the 1908 Summer Olympics
- Gijs Lamoree (born 1903 in Schoonhoven – 1966) a Dutch athlete, competed in the men's long jump and the men's triple jump at the 1928 Summer Olympics
- Hein Vergeer (born 1961 in Haastrecht) a former speed skater, competed at the 1984 and 1988 Winter Olympics
- Leo Visser (born 1966 in Haastrecht) is a Dutch former speed skater, four time medallist at the 1988 and the 1992 Winter Olympics
- Edith van Dijk (born 1973 in Haastrecht) a Dutch swimmer and 6-fold world champion
- Yvonne van Vlerken (born 1978 in Krimpen aan de Lek) a Dutch triathlete and duathlete
- Patrick Roest (born 1995 in Lekkerkerk) a Dutch speed skater, competed at the 2018 and 2022 Winter Olympics

== Gallery ==
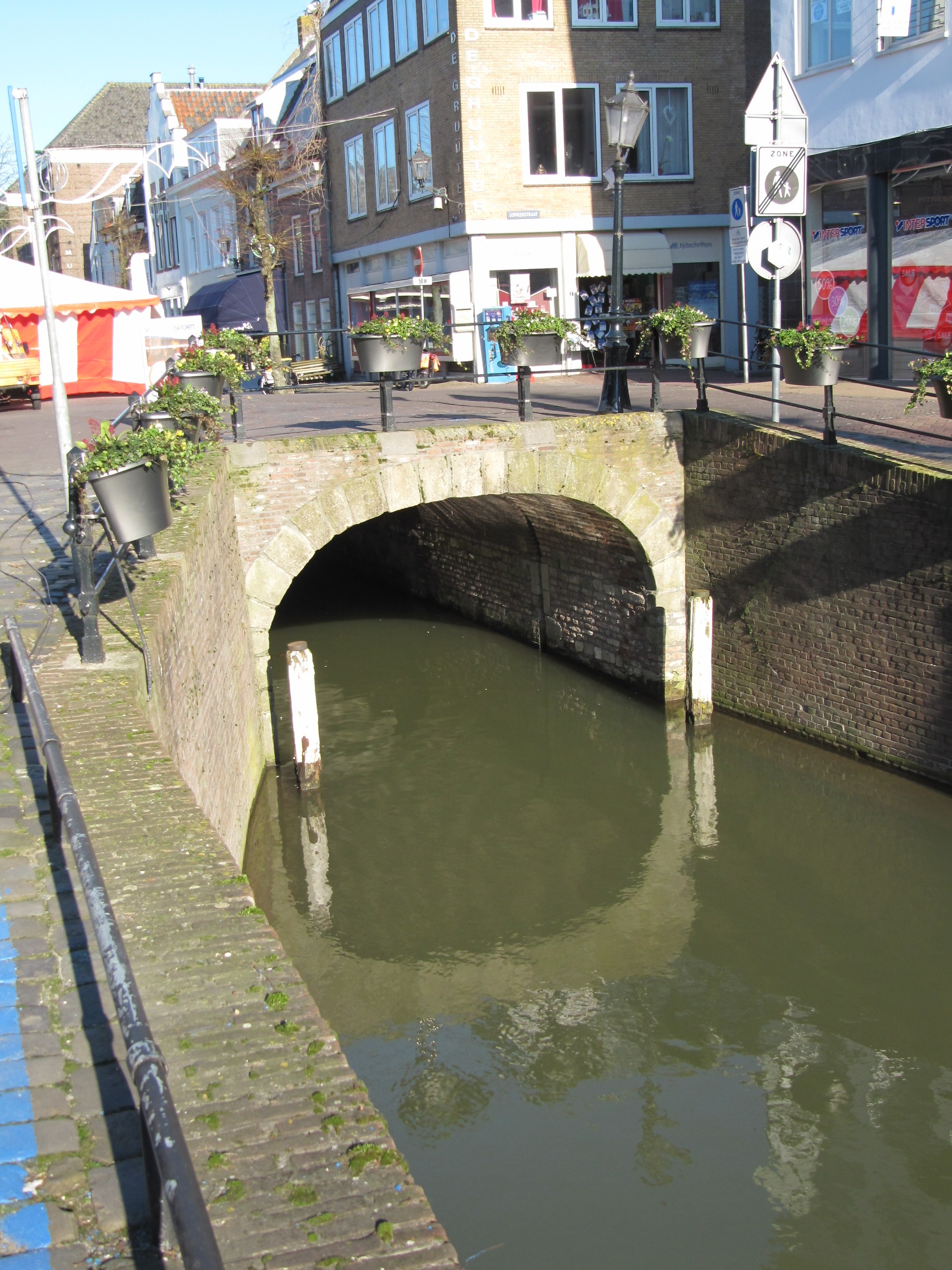
Schoonhoven - Haven

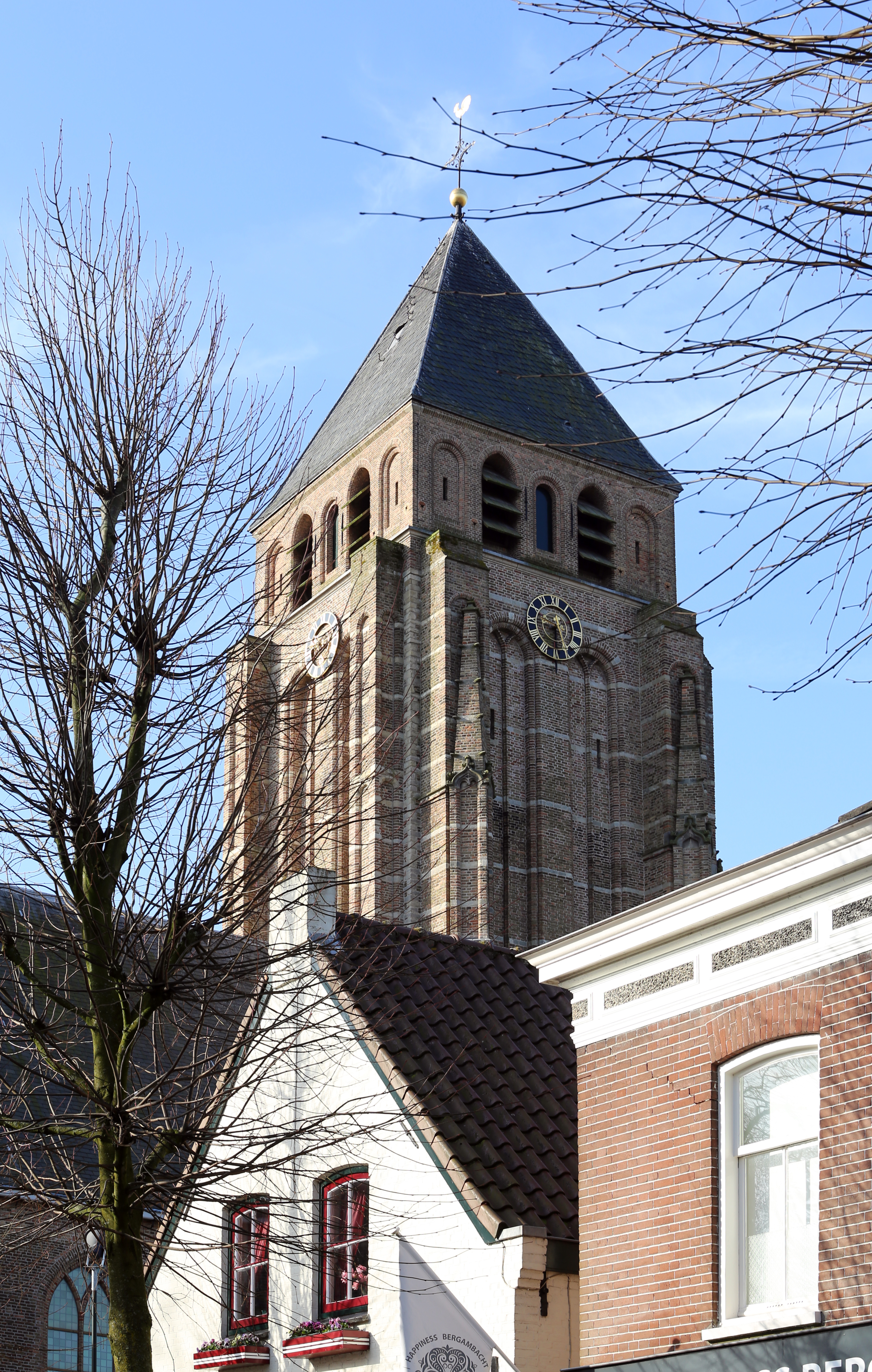
Bergambacht, Hervormde Kerk, campanile

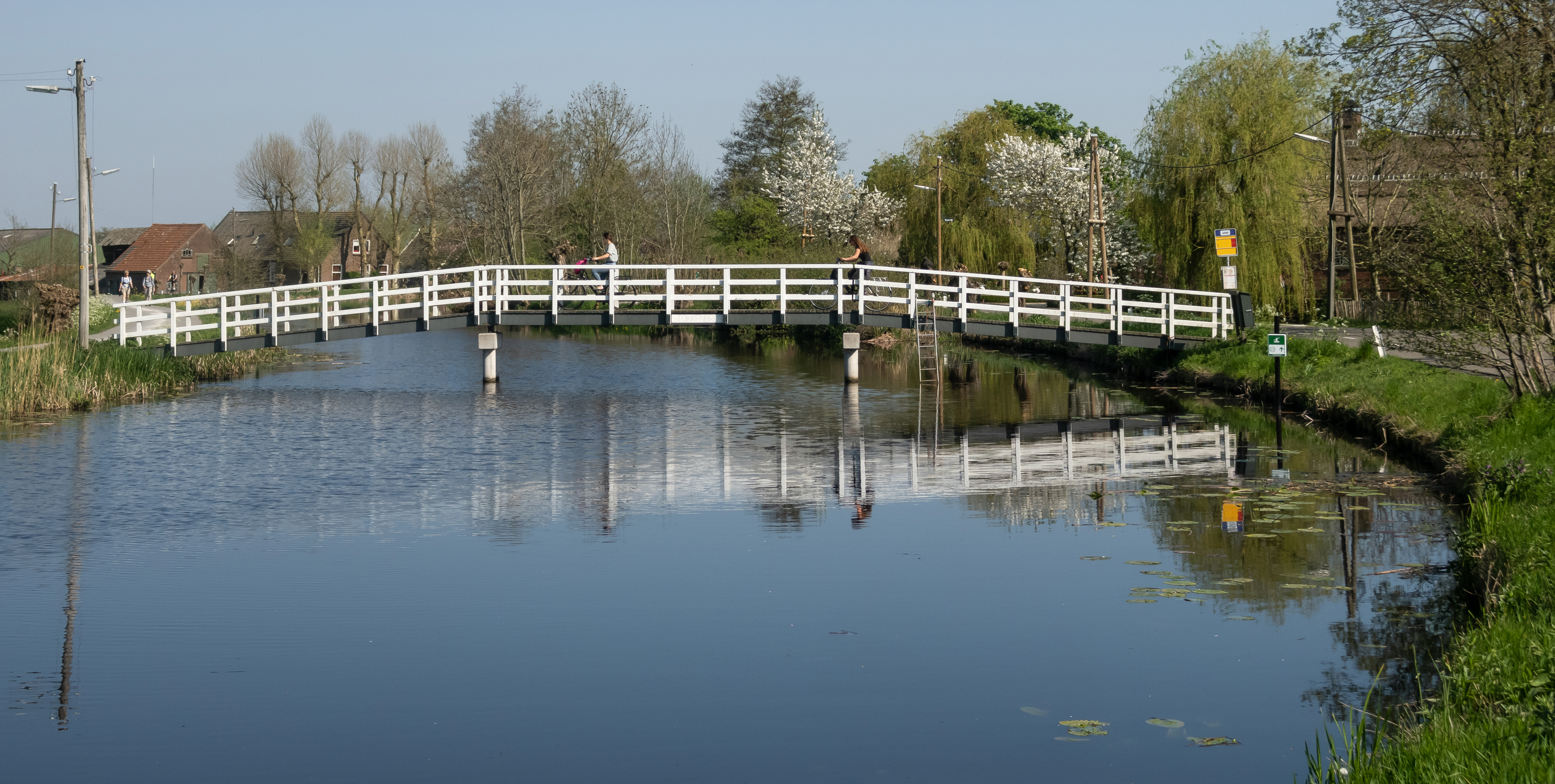
Vlist, de Stokjesbrug

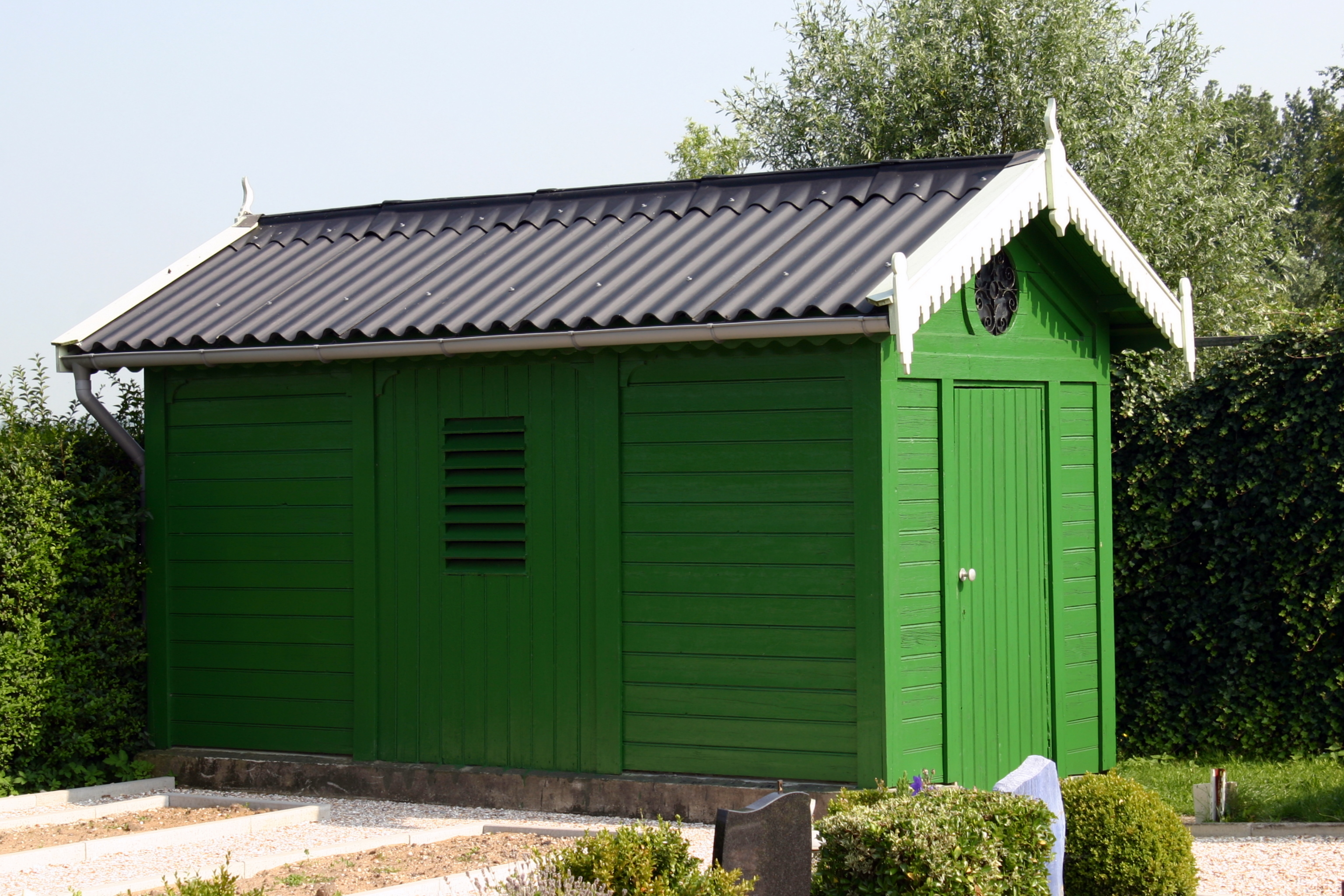
Baarhuisje Sint-Barnabaskerk, Haastrecht
