= Justine Constance Wirix-van Mansvelt =

Dutch writer (1876–1937)

Justine Constance Wirix-van Mansvelt (22 December 1876 – 18 August 1937) was a Dutch Protestant expert on the oeuvre of the Italian poet and writer Dante Alighieri (1265–1321).

== Birth ==
Justine Constance van Mansvelt was born in Schoonhoven as the second child of Rinse van Mansvelt, who retired with the rank of artillery major, and Augustina Maria Wilhelmina Slingeland. Their first child, Justine's brother George Louis, died very young.

Justine's ancestors clearly had a vivid interest in literature. Her grandfather from mother's side, the magistrate Leendert Slingeland (husband of Geertruy Hoek), was a former literature student and worked on behalf of the Schoonhoven residents at the placing of the new statue of Laurens Janszoon Coster (ca. 1370–1440) at the Grote Markt in Haarlem. Dutchman Coster was at that time thought to be the inventor of the printing press.

Two of Justine's great-grandfathers played a small role in the literary scene of the Netherlands: On her father's side this was the artistic Utrecht lawyer Anthony Jan van Mansvelt, who must have known the 18th century Dutch poet Jacobus Bellamy (1757–1786) personally. He painted the two Bellamy portraits, now in the collections of the Zeeuws Archief at Middelburg and the maritime museum MuZEEum at Vlissingen. On her mother's side this was Melchior Hoek, an ennobled infantry officer in Napoleon's Grande Armée, who wrote his memoirs about his experiences of the Russian and German campaigns. Parts of this document were published during his lifetime. Justine's paternal great-grandfather Rinse Koopmans, a Professor at the Mennonite Seminary in Amsterdam, played a more substantial role in the literary scene. This near ancestor published in the literary and cultural magazine Vaderlandsche letteroefeningen (1804) about the 17th century works of Dutch men of letters.

== Faith ==
The sword of prayer of 1st lieutenant Melchior Hoek in Russia in 1812

Justine had a Protestant background. Later in her life, she chose for the Walloon church, a Dutch Reformed denomination. In the way the relatives on her mother's side of the family believed, there was room for specific notions about the afterlife. It is very likely that grandfather Leendert Slingeland, during his Leiden study, had visited lectures of history teacher Willem Bilderdijk (1756–1831), in the Netherlands a celebrated poet and a contemporary of the English poet and mystic William Blake (1757–1827). Bilderdijk wrote a mourning poem on Julius Willem Bilderdijk, his twenty-year-old son who perished at sea, stretching his poetic text into the hereafter. His rhyming declamation De Geestenwareld (1811) mentions celestial beings looking after their living relatives.

Distinct liberal notions about the hereafter we find in Justine's family archives, in rare examples of Dutch poems about grief. In two of them, family members who died are mentioned as spiritual manifestations: a deceased great-uncle of her mother's and the deceased twenty-two-year-old great-uncle Johan Wilhelm Hoek (JWH). Johan's deeply bereaved parents play a part in a stylistically classical, mournful poem. Elements of this poem are obviously derived from the poem on Julius Willem Bilderdijk (JWB). The inspiration probably was caught from the combination of faith, literary taste and from an idea of some similarity: initials and age of the two deceased young men are to some extent comparable. In the consolation segment of the poem, Johan's mother (Justine's great-grandmother Hoek), becomes aware of the still existing liaison of kindred souls:

... Verrukt roept moeder nu: Daar vind ik Johan weêr
'k Heb vroeger misgetast: Hij wenkt, hij spreekt, hij leeft,
Ik spreek met zijnen geest, die om mij henen zweeft ...

Translation:

... Blissful mother now calls out: There I find my Johan again
Earlier I’ve been mistaken: He nods, he speaks, he lives,
I’m speaking with his spirit, which is floating around me ...

In the direct vicinity of Justine's family we find the poet widower Jan Brand van Cabauw (1785–1847), Lord of Cabauw and two other villages near Schoonhoven, for whom grandfather Slingeland worked as a steward and trustee. Great-uncle Gabriël Leonard van Oosten Slingeland was Brand's successor as Lordship of the villages Cabauw and Zevender. In one of his poems the poet remembers seeing his dead ten-year-old daughter Isabella. As a singing young angel, Belle descended from heaven to comfort her grieving father.

== Education ==
The young Justine Constance van Mansvelt lived in Schoonhoven and The Hague. The Van Mansvelt family from the provincial capital of Utrecht, she belonged to, already since the 17th century was an upper-middle-class family. During two centuries (since 1601) Van Mansvelt's were member of the Utrecht city council.

Justine was taught French during her youth. The private tutor Marie Madeleine Rivoire, from the Italian town of Torre Pellice, began her Dutch teaching career as a young woman, in 1880. Rivoire belonged to the Northern Italian Protestant family Rivoire (Rivoir) of the medieval religious movement of the Waldensians. In or shortly after 1889 Rivoire moved to The Hague, where she taught French at a private school. She might have been giving Justine secondary French education because of the planned Brussels period (see next). In her book (published 1929/1930) Justine credits Marie Rivoire as her first guide in the literary world of the medieval Italian poet and writer Dante Alighieri, which would inspire her for the rest of her live.

Around 1895 Justine was sent to finishing school in Brussels, in the vicinity of the Warande Park. This was probably the 'Institution de demoiselles' run by the widow Jouret in the Rue Ducale. Thanks to a guestbook used by the twenty-year-old Justine, we know she was back in The Hague in November 1897.

In the first years of her marriage Justine learned to speak and write Italian. Most probably tutor Marie Rivoire had already planted the seed of the Italian language. As appears from her 1911 article Justine mastered this language long before the Florence edition of her book came out (1930). It seems possible that future university professor of Italian Romano Nobile Guarnieri (1883–1955), from the town of Adria in Northern Italy, was her second tutor. At the beginning of the 20th century Guarnieri taught Italian in Arnhem, a Dutch city near the German border. Justine then lived in the nearby garrison town of Venlo. If the interest in Dante's works already truly existed, Justine could have been attracted to the Italian language because of it. At any rate, it is likely that the contacts of Justine's husband (see next paragraph) boosted her interest for the language. Her spouse met as an also abroad competing fencer several Italian sportsmen at fencing matches in Ostend (Belgium) and The Hague. Postcards and photographs remind of cordial relations with husband Anthonie as well as Justine. The longest lasting contact seems to have been the contact with the 1908 Olympic fencing champion cavalry captain Alessandro Pirzio-Biroli (1877–1962). The family archives contain, among other things, a small pile of unused military postcards signed by him, dating from the first decades of the 20th century.

== Marriage ==
On 21 September 1899, Justine married the above-mentioned cavalry officer Anthonie Petrus Wirix in The Hague, who would eventually retire as a Colonel and Knight in the Order of Orange-Nassau (military division). Their marriage produced two children: Bella Virginie Wirix (1900) and René Paul Wirix (1902). The son would later be part of the Dutch resistance in World War II. The family Wirix-van Mansvelt lived mostly in The Hague at Heemskerkstraat 23, in the 'Zeehelden' quarter near the gardens of the Noordeinde Palace.

Anthonie Petrus Wirix was also a military author. One of his articles, on the use of cavalry, in 1928 came out in the Italian language. It is very likely that the text for this article was translated by Justine. As to the reputation of Italy's military leader at that time: it was just in the second part of the thirties that Il Duce became widely unpopular with the Dutch people. As an expression of the much changed opinion of him, the newspaper De Telegraaf of 24 September 1937 shows a satirical cartoon on the peace policy of the Italian and German dictators by the celebrated political cartoonist Louis Raemaekers (1869–1956), who was married to Johanna Petronella van Mansvelt, one of Justine's cousins.

Just as his wife Anthonie Wirix had a fascination with Dante's oeuvre. Inspired by the illustrations in Jacob van Maerlant's 'Rhyme Bible' (1271), Anthonie made as many as 670 coloured miniatures for the 34 cantos of 'The Inferno' section of Dante's epic poem The divine Comedy (La divina Commedia). These pen drawings, which he probably meant to publish, are part of the archives of the family of the mentioned great-grandfather Hoek. The 28 pen drawings illustrating Dante's Vita Nuova in the Wirix-van Mansvelt collection at the National Library of the Netherlands are most probably by the hand of Wirix too. Artisticity may have been a Wirix family feature, because Anthonie's sister Victoire Leonhardt-Wirix (1875–1938) was an artist with a lifelong passion for painting and drawing. Examples of Antonie's miniatures below illustrate the first three segments of canto XV of The divine Comedy. Dante (in red) and his guide Virgil walk along the banks of an infernal water stream and in the canto a comparison between Flemish and Italian water defences is made.

Miniatures to The divine Comedy Inf. XV: 1–9

== Dante study ==
In the Netherlands around 1900 the interest in the ancient Italian culture and language revitalized. In 1904 the Dutch Department of Internal Affairs grounded the 'Nederlandsch Instituut' (Dutch Institute) in Rome (at present the Koninklijk Nederlands Instituut Rome (KNIR)), to catalogue the documents on Dutch history in the just released Vatican archives. From the beginning the institute also stimulated the research of Roman Antiquity and art. In 1914 the first Dutch branches of the 'Società Dante Alighieri' (Dante Alighieri Society) in Rome were grounded, to provide Italian cultural events in the Netherlands. In 1919 and 1920 the Universities in Groningen and Leiden appointed their first tutor Italian language.

The keen interest in Dante's works is somewhat older in the Netherlands. This curiosity dates from the era of Dutch Romanticism (1820–1880) and stretches into the 21st century. The oldest Dutch book on Dante regards the 1865 translation of Dante und seine Theologie by Dr. Ferdinand Piper, Theology Professor in Berlin.

The young Justine was touched by the works of Dante. We may assume that the Dante fascination originated from her youth and early years of marriage, probably from the time of the French and Italian lessons: the lessons that could have been given by the tutors Rivoire and Guarnieri, in The Hague and Arnhem. She tells in her book that Marie Rivoire made the works trusted to her. Justine was introduced by Rivoire to the story of the journey of Dante, guided by Virgil, through the realms of the afterlife of The divine Comedy. But it is hard to conceive that Guarnieri, who knew her for at least ten years (and sent her Dante postcards from Italy) has not played a significant part in the growth of the knowledge Justine acquired. Guarnieri (in 1914) founded the above-mentioned Amsterdam, Arnhem and The Hague branches of the 'Società Dante Alighieri'. In fact, in the beginning, both persons might have helped her getting (further) acquainted with Dante's enigmatic creations of the Middle Ages.

It seems that by 1911, Justine, thirty-four years old, was ready to publish an article in the men's world of Dante experts. It concerned an article about her interpretation on Dante's 'The Inferno' section in the then in the Netherlands well known cultural and literary magazine De nieuwe Gids. In this article she gives – brave but modest – her vision on Dante's description of the way the fallen archangel Lucifer hit the earth. Interpretations on this issue by other Dante experts could not satisfy her.

According to the illustrated postcards in the period 1906–1932 received by Justine and her husband, she knew several other experts from the world of lovers of the Dante masterpieces of her time personally. Among their names we find the mentioned Romano Guarnieri. With the authors Henri Hauvette, Professor at the University of Paris, and Willem Alexander van Leer in Amsterdam (one of the two editors of the Dutch Dante tribute 1321–1921), she clearly maintained friendly relations. Many foreign family names could belong to senders of the Italian branches of the Società Dantesca Italiana in Florence or to the Rome 'Società Dante Alighieri'.

The major interest of Justine in the works of the medieval poet led to many visits to Italy. From 1928, after her daughter had married and her son had finished his education at the Dutch Military Academy, Justine and her husband stayed for considerable parts of the year in Naples, Florence, Ravenna and other Italian cities.

== Life’s end ==
For some time Justine suffered from a severe illness. In February 1937 her husband from the Italian resort town Bordighera wrote to his son and daughter-in-law in the Netherlands, telling them that their mother – who usually liked to walk – had taken a carriage to the open air winter concert. The front of his postcard shows us a photograph of the concert visitors, among whom Justine and himself. It was probably an early sign of the rapid deterioration of Justine's health which would manifest later that year. In June 1937 she and her husband returned from Bordighera to The Hague. After several weeks in hospital 'Ziekenhuis Bronovo' Justine Constance Wirix–van Mansvelt died in The Hague on 18 August 1937, sixty years old. Too early, also according to the author of the tribute in the newspapers Haagsche Courant and Het Vaderland of 26 August:

Because of the death of Madam Wirix-van Mansvelt our country has to bewail the loss of a gifted and an extraordinary character.

Her body was laid to rest in the family vault Van Mansvelt-Slingeland in the graveyard Kerkhoflaan in The Hague.

== Legacy ==
Widower Anthonie Petrus Wirix and their children donated her extensive Dantean collection to the National Library of the Netherlands. This collection contains authentic writings, drawings (possibly made by Anthonie), facsimiles of medieval manuscripts, editions of Dante's works from earlier ages and relevant modern interpretive studies. It also contains translations in many languages, particularly of The divine Comedy. From 1937 to today, the Wirix-van Mansvelt collection makes that the National Library focuses on the acquisition of books by and on Dante.

== Literary products ==
Front cover of the Dutch edition with the author before Dante

In 1921 (before the traveling years) Justine stayed with a group of people in Ravenna because of the conference for the 600th Anniversary of Dante's death. Was this group – the Dutch 'Dante pilgrims' – the deputation of the Dutch branches of the 'Società Dante Alighieri'? Justine's presence was then, according to the mentioned newspaper tribute, highly appreciated by Italian experts. Presumably the journalist of the article wanted, approximately fifteen years later (1937), to refer to an impressive speech at the conference.

Justine's major work is the book Dante’s veelzijdigheid about the interpretation of the conceptions mentioned in the works of Dante, a sort of literary lexicon. It mainly regards the conceptions in the 14th century epic poem The divine Comedy. This book was published in 1929 by Van Stockum in The Hague. Its Italian translation Il sapere universale di Dante came out a year later, published by the Florence publishing house Tipografia Sordomuti. The title page contains lines from 'The Inferno' section' of The divine Comedy, which Justine altered in her address to the great poet (these are also in the text of her ex-libris):

Dante, Vagliami 'l lungo studio e 'l grande amore / Che m’ha fatto cercar lo tuo volume (Inf. I: 83, 84)
(in the style of Justine’s Dutch translation: Dante, / That thou mayest reward my long study and the great love / That made me search for thy work)

Both editions include her own poem in praise of Dante. Of course she also made a translation for the Italian reader. Justine's epilogue of the Dutch edition as well as her preface to the Italian edition is dated at Easter. This date is symbolic: At Easter Day Dante returned from his journey through the hereafter, similar to the resurrection of Jesus Christ. In her personal copy, she registered that the Dutch edition came out on the first of July 1929: her son's wedding day.

For people who ask themselves specialist questions about the Dante works Justine's book is as said a kind of lexicon, a reference book. In an early stage Justine realized that Dante had put the whole knowledge of his time in his works. Analyzing the oeuvre with emphasis on The divine Comedy, she divided the rich information into the categories 'enkelvoudige dingen' ('singular subjects') and 'samengestelde dingen' ('combined subjects'), which she in Dante’s veelzijdigheid and its Italian version consequently divided. In the first category one finds the subcategory 'the four elements'. In the second category the subcategories: 'minerals', 'plants', 'animals' and 'human beings'. In turn all subcategories were further divided by Justine. Dante himself in his work Il Convito (The Banquet), hands over the categories and subcategories to his readers. Justine's alphabetical index shows par excellence the 'veelzijdigheid' (diversity) of the erudite poet: one reads words from horse riding to monkey, from drums to thunder, from dream explanation to vocation muses.

The Dutch artist Jan Toorop (1858–1928) made the watercolour entitled 'Dante verheft de Ziel' (Dante lifts the soul) especially for Justine. The painting depicts Justine kneeling before Dante in divine admiration, with The divine Comedy under her arm. She used it for the cover of the Dutch edition of her book. The Dante portrait by Giotto (c. 1267–1337) she used to illustrate the interior of her Italian edition.

In Italy, 1965, Justine's interpretation on the fall of Lucifer in the 'Inferno' section, published in De nieuwe Gids – most probably her first in print – was noticed at the preparation of Dante's 700th birthday. The author of Dante e la medicina, a book presumably published because of this commemoration had consulted the 'lexicon'. Justine's reference book Dante’s veelzijdigheid and its translation Il sapere universale di Dante still is a useful tool for Dante study. It nowadays offers an entry – also thanks to the headwords in page margins and index – to the difficult Divine Comedy. The masterpiece of world literature remains, even after years of study and dedication, in essence utterly incomprehensible as we can read in Justine's laudatory poem on Dante:

... Hebt gij 't hiernamaals waarlijk ons ontsloten,
Gij dichter, aller dichtren vorst genoemd?
Wordt werkelijk de ziel in 't vuur verstooten
Of tot het nooit te ontdooien ijs gedoemd?
Wat weten wij? De waarheid ligt verscholen,
Door dichteren verergerd of verbloemd ...

Translation:

... Did thou indeed unlock the hereafter for us,
Thou poet, known as king of all poets?
Shall the soul really be thrown into the fire
Or condemned to never defrosting ice?
What do we know? The truth is situated secretly,
By poets aggravated or camouflaged ...

== Bibliography ==
- 'Iets over 'la Tomba' di Lucifero ed il 'Cammino Ascoso'’, in: De nieuwe Gids XXVI (1911) (July) p. 69-78
- Dante’s veelzijdigheid (The Hague 1929) (incl. laudatory poem)
- Il sapere universale di Dante (Florence 1930) (same book, translated by the author) (incl. Dutch laudatory poem with its Italian translation)
- 'Catalogo Dantesco', 1926 (works on Dante published in Europe 1823–1926) (manuscript)
- Texts of two speeches on Dante by J.C. Wirix-van Mansvelt, c. 1930 (manuscripts)
- 'Dantesk toerisme', c. 1935 (unpublished tourist guide)
- possibly by J.C. Wirix–van Mansvelt as translator: A.P. Wirix, 'Il fuoco ed il movimento nell’esplorazione di cavalleria', in: Estratto dalla Rivista d’Artigliera en Genio (vol. 1928)
