= Marrie Bot =

Dutch photographer and graphic designer

Marrie Bot (born June 24, 1946) is a Dutch photographer and graphic designer.

== Biography ==
Born in Bergambacht, Bot started her career in 1963 as a graphic designer. She received some formal art education at the Vrije Academie in The Hague in the 1973/74 academic year.

Since 1976 she increasingly started focussing on photography, and settled as an independent artist in Rotterdam. She experimented with several forms of photography from portrait photography, street photography, documentary photography, and nude photography to photojournalism.

In her work Bot has often chosen those socio-political themes which are a taboo. She researched and studied her subjects at length before she presented her work. Subjects she pictured have been massive pilgrimages in Europe in 1984, mentally handicapped in 1988, and multicultural funeral and mourning rituals in the Netherlands in 1998.

Bot was awarded the Maria Austria Photography Prize in 1989 for her photobook 'Bezwaard bestaan' on mentally handicapped people and the Dr A.H. Heineken Prize for Art in 1990 for her complete oeuvre.

== See also ==
- List of women photographers

== Selected publications ==
- Marrie Bot, Miserere: de grote boetebedevaarten in Europa, 1984
- Marrie Bot, Miserere: The great pilgrimages of penance in Europe. Rotterdam: Marrie Bot, 1985. ISBN 90-800066-1-0. An English-language version of the Dutch-language book.
- Marrie Bot, Bezwaard bestaan : foto's en verhalen over verstandelijk gehandicapten. 1988. ISBN 9789080006652.
- Marrie Bot, Fotoboek over bedevaartgangers in plaatsen in o.a. Spanje, Polen en Ierland. 1989.
- Marrie Bot, Amsterdam (Netherlands). Stedelijk Museum (1990), Marrie Bot, photographer.
- Marrie Bot, Een laatste groet: uitvaart- en rouwrituelen in multicultureel Nederland, M. Bot. 1998.
