= Arnoldus Montanus =

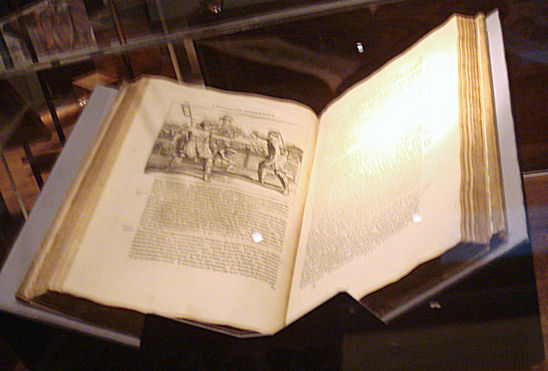
Arnoldus Montanus, 1680, Ambassades Mémorables de la Compagnie des Indes Orientales des Provinces unies, vers les Empereurs du Japon.

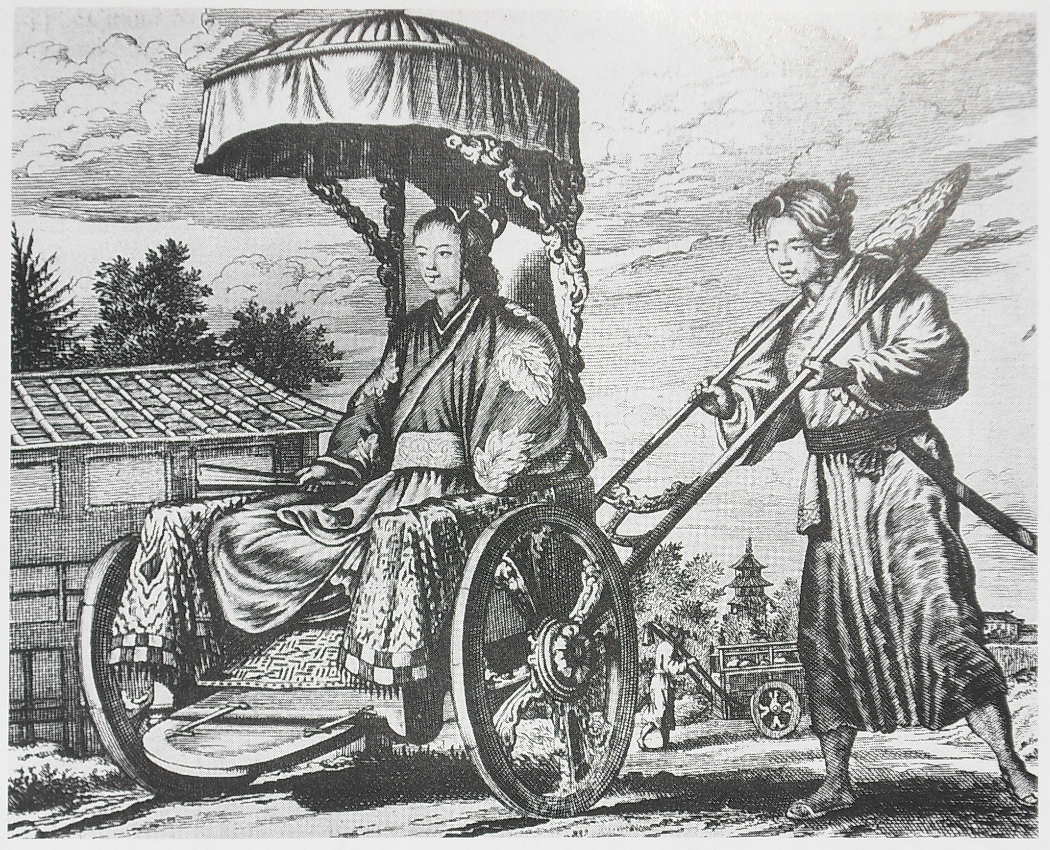
"The rich carriage of Taikōsama (court) lady-in-waiting", a picture from Montanus' richly illustrated 1669 book about Japan. The picture owes more to imagination than to observation.

Arnoldus Montanus (c. 1625–1683) was a Dutch teacher and author who published books on theology, history, and geography of both the Netherlands and faraway countries.

Montanus, a Latinized form of van den Berg or van Bergen, was born in Amsterdam and studied theology at Leiden University. He became a minister in Schellingwoude in 1653 and in Schoonhoven, where he also became headmaster of the Latin School, in 1667. He died in Schoonhoven.

His most famous book is De Nieuwe en Onbekende Weereld.

== Principal works ==
- 1669 Gedenkwaerdige Gesantschappen der Oost-Indische Maetschappy in't Vereenigde Nederland, aen de Kaisaren van Japan. Getrokken uit de Geschriften en Reiseaentekeninge der zelver Gesanten, Amsterdam, Jacob Meurs. (1670 English translation, Atlas Japannensis, Being Remarkable Addresses By Way of Embassy from the East India Company of the United Provinces, to the Emperor of Japan, Thomas Johnson, publisher; 1673 French translation, Ambassades mémorables de la Compagnie, Amsterdam, Jacob Meurs)
- 1671 De Nieuwe en Onbekende Weereld: of beschryving van America en 't Zuid-Land, Amsterdam, Jacob Meurs (The New and Unknown World: or Description of America and the Southland, Containing the Origin of the Americans and South-landers, Remarkable Voyages Thither, Quality of the Shores, Islands, Cities, Fortresses, Towns, Temples, Mountains, Sources, Rivers, Houses, the Nature of Beasts, Trees, Plants and Foreign Crops, Religion and Manners, Miraculous Occurrences, Old and New Wars: Adorned with Illustrations Drawn from the Life in America, and Described by Arnoldus Montanus), and 1673 German translation, Die Unbekante Neue Welt, Amsterdam, Jacob Meurs
- 1671 (English edition) Atlas Chinensis: Being a Relation of Remarkable Passages in Two Embassies from the East-India Company of the United Provinces to the Vice-Roy Singlamong, General Taising Lipovi, and Konchi, Emperor, Thomas Johnson, publisher.
