= Berkenwoude =

- dorp
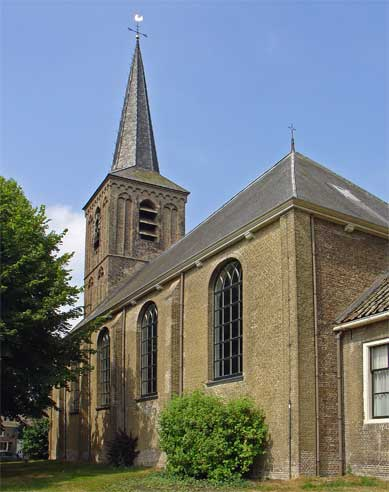
- The Reformed Church (Nederlands Hervormde Kerk) of Berkenwoude

- Coat of arms
- Interactive map of Berkenwoude
- Coordinates: 51°56′43″N 4°42′32″E
- Country: Netherlands
- Province: South Holland
- Municipality: Krimpenerwaard

Population (2004)
  - Total: 1,510

Berkenwoude is a village in the Netherlands, in the municipality of Krimpenerwaard. Until 1985, it was a separate municipality, when it became part of Bergambacht. Now it's a part of the Krimpenerwaard. The village has approximately 1,500 inhabitants and it is situated in the middle of the Krimpenerwaard.

The earliest attestation of Berkenwoude in surviving documents dates to 1326, when it was called Bercou.

In 1750, a tornado took place at the village of Berkoude in South Holland, according to a survey of 244 tornadoes in Europe between 1456 and 1913, collected in Wind- und Wasserhosen in Europa (1917) by German meteorologist Alfred Wegener.
