= Zevender =

- Neighbourhood and hamlet
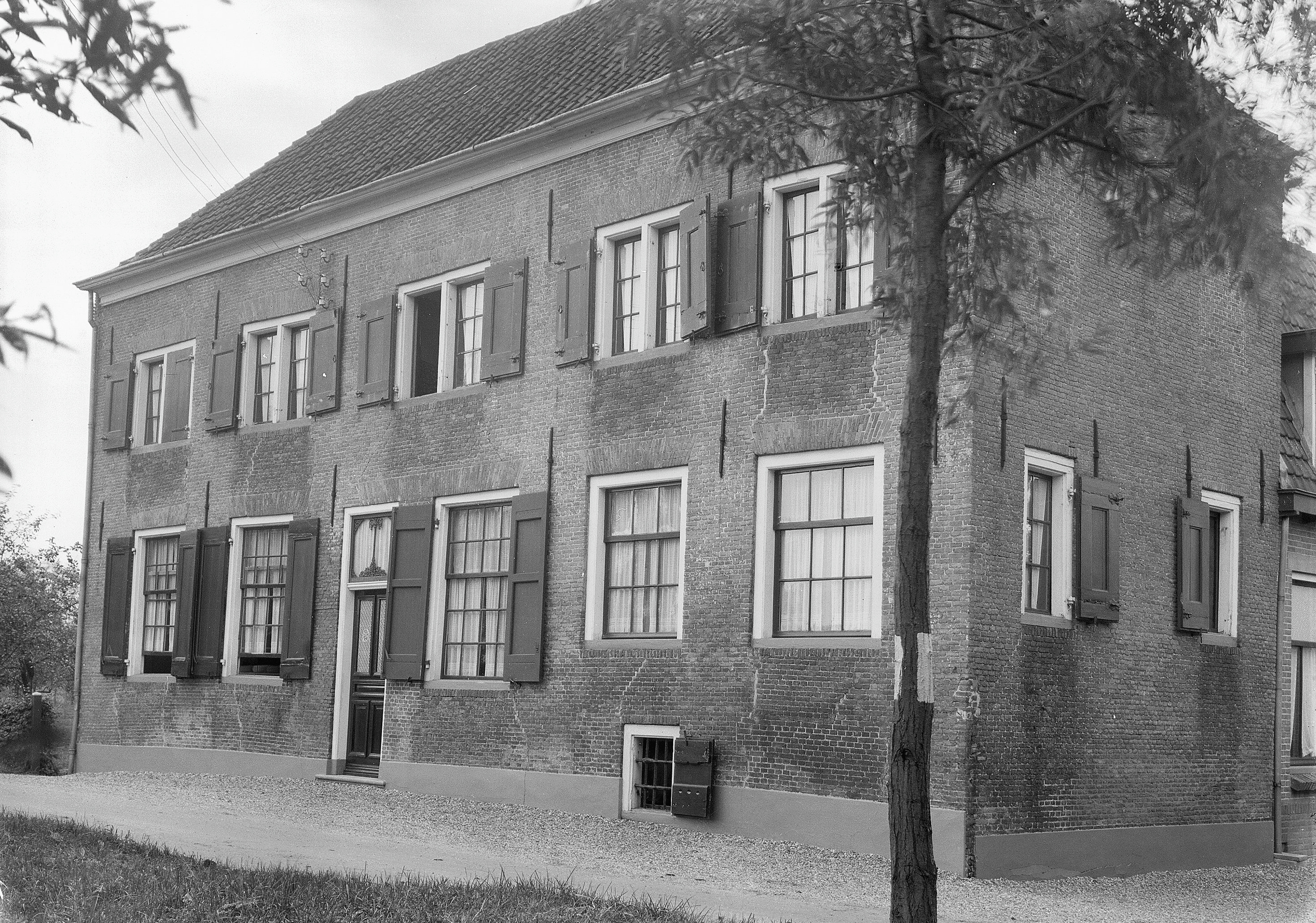
- House in Zevender

- Location in the Netherlands Zevender (Netherlands)
- Coordinates: 51.95661°N 4.87572°E
- Country: Netherlands
- Province: Utrecht
- Municipality: Lopik

Area
  - Total: 0.50 km^{2} (0.19 sq mi)

Population (2021)
  - Total: 175
  - Density: 350/km^{2} (910/sq mi)
- Time zone: UTC+1 (CET)
  - Summer (DST): UTC+2 (CEST)
- Postal code: 3411
- Dialing code: 0348

Zevender is a hamlet in the Dutch province of Utrecht. It is located in the municipality of Lopik, 2 km northeast of Schoonhoven. A part of Zevender has become a neighbourhood of Schoonhoven.

Zevender was a separate municipality from 1817 to 1857, when it was merged with Willige Langerak.

It was first mentioned in 1247 as Zeuendre. The etymology is unclear. The postal authorities have placed it under Lopik. There are no place name signs. A castle formerly stood in Zevender, enduring sieges in 1300 and 1304 before its destruction by fire in 1518. In 1540, Charles V ordered the removal of the ruins. In 1840, Zevender was home to 129 people.

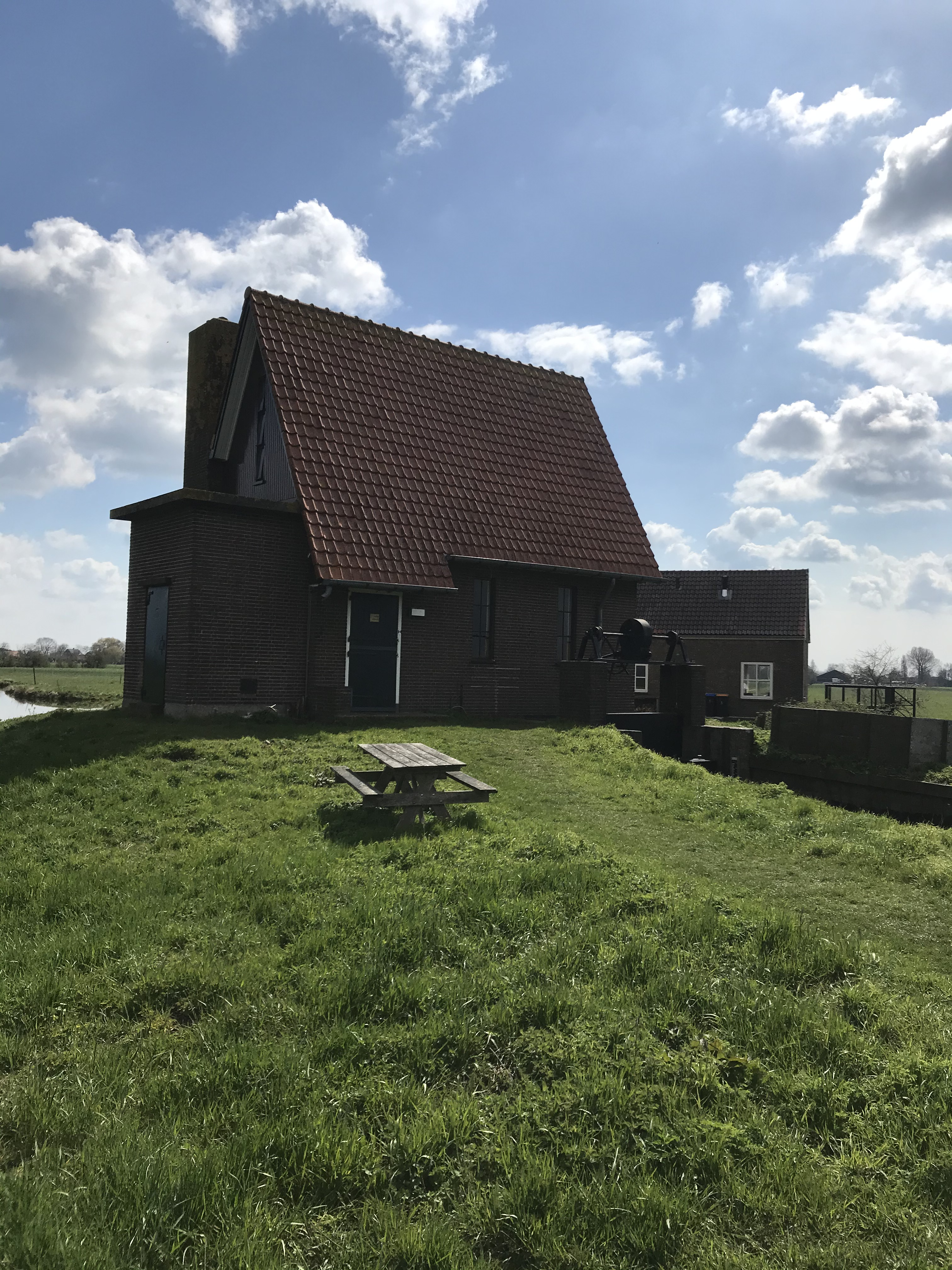
Pumping house in Zevender
