= De Nieuwe en Onbekende Weereld =

- Cover of the first edition
- Author: Arnoldus Montanus
- Language: Dutch
- Genre: Travel literature, scientific
- Publisher: Jacob van Meurs
- Publication date: 1671
- Publication place: Netherlands
- Media type: Print
- Pages: 585
- Preceded by: Gedenkwaerdige Gesantschappen der Oost-Indische Maetschappy in't Vereenigde Nederland
- Followed by: Ambassades mémorables de la Compagnie

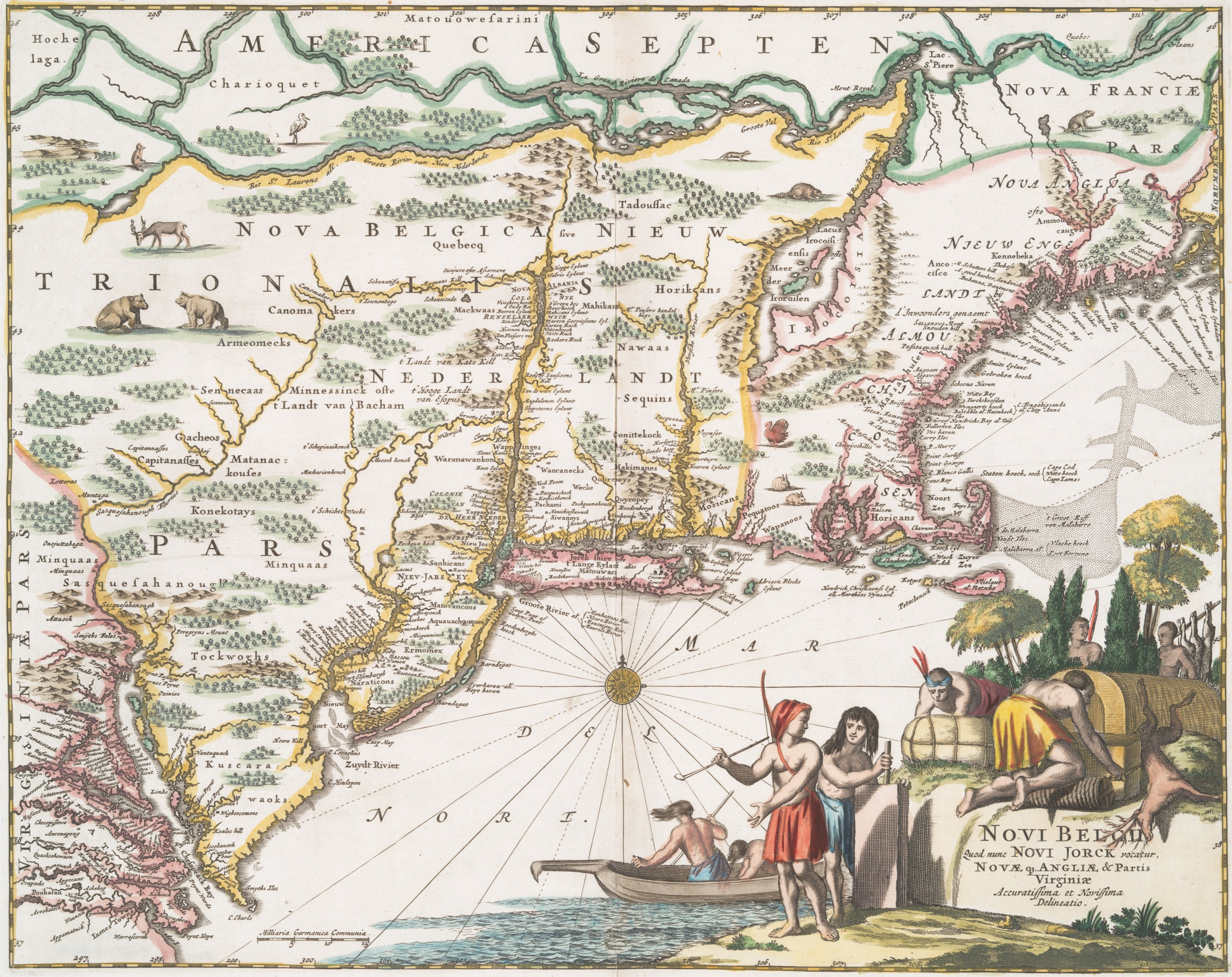
Novi Belgii, quod nunc Novi Jorck vocatur, Novæque Angliæ & partis Virginiæ Accuratissima et Novissima Delineatio, 1671

External images
- Full book
- Book browser (Smithsonian)
- Summary and PDF (LoC)

De Nieuwe en Onbekende Weereld (Dutch) or The New and Unknown World (English) is a 1671 travel book by Arnoldus Montanus. It describes the New World, and it depicts the region in its illustrations. It was published by Jacob van Meurs. It was published, after translation into English, by John Ogilby. The book has 125 engravings made of copper. It has 70 plates and 16 maps.

== Title ==
The full Dutch title is De Nieuwe en Onbekende Weereld: of Beschryving van America en 't Zuid-Land, Vervaetende d'Oorsprong der Americaenen en Zuid-landers, gedenkwaerdige togten derwaerds, Gelegendheid Der vaste Kusten, Eilanden, Steden, Sterkten, Dorpen, Tempels, Bergen, Fonteinen, Stroomen, Huisen, de natuur van Beesten, Boomen, Planten en vreemde Gewasschen, Gods dienst en Zeden, Wonderlijke Voorvallen, Vereeuwde en Nieuwe Oorlogen: Verciert met Af-beeldsels na 't leven in America gemaekt, en beschreeven door Arnoldus Montanus

The English title is The New and Unknown World: or Description of America and the Southland, Containing the Origin of the Americans and South-landers, remarkable voyages thither, Quality of the Shores, Islands, Cities, Fortresses, Towns, Temples, Mountains, Sources, Rivers, Houses, the nature of Beasts, Trees, Plants and foreign Crops, Religion and Manners, Miraculous Occurrences, Old and New Wars: Adorned with Illustrations drawn from the life in America, and described by Arnoldus Montanus.

== Reception ==
An excerpt of the summary from the Library of Congress is, "Montanus never visited the New World and his work contains numerous errors and fantastic conceptions about the people and animals of the Americas. Nonetheless, it became a standard work in Europe and was widely read for many years."
