= Bergambacht =

- Village and former municipality
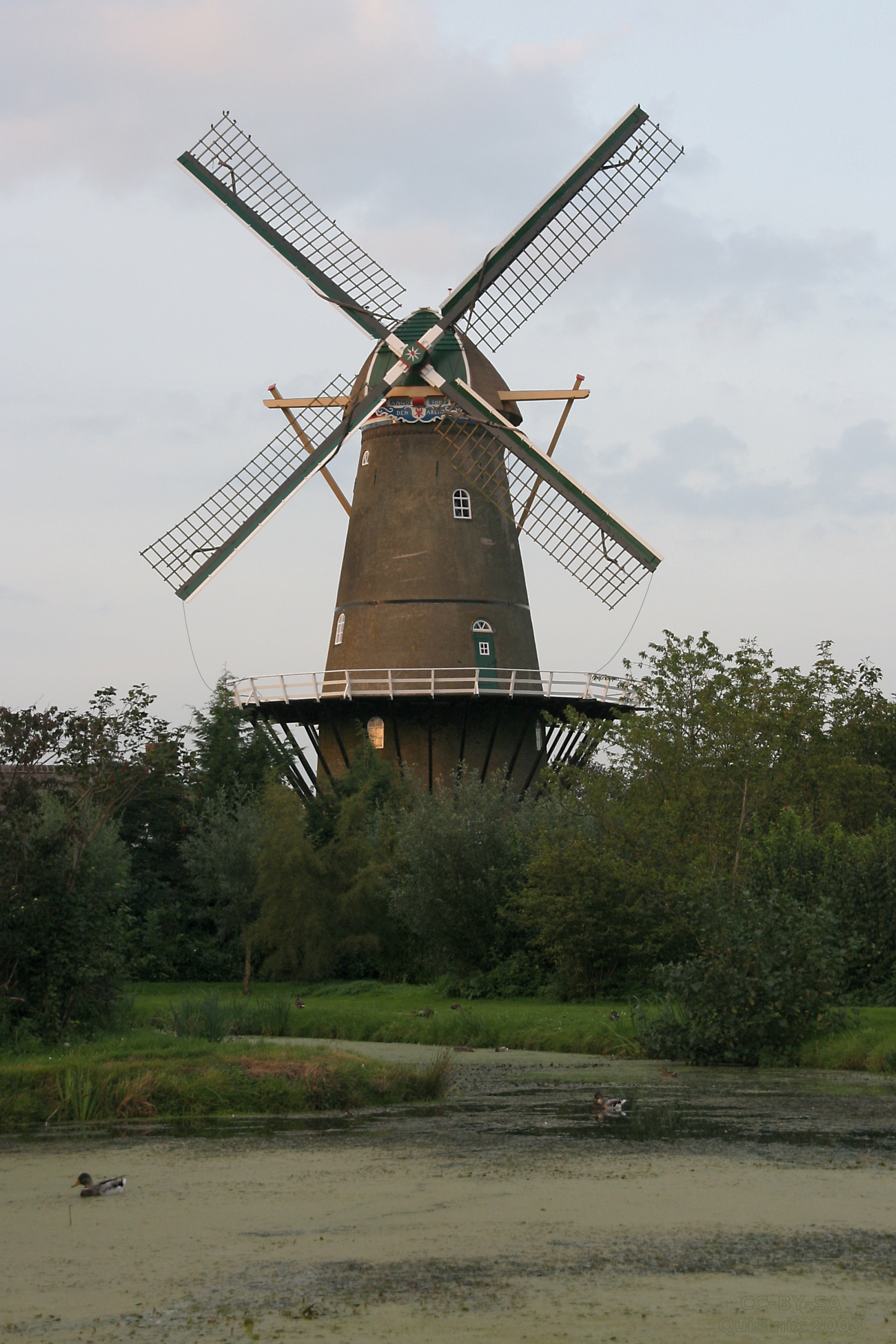
- Windmill Den Arend in Bergambacht

- Location in South Holland
- Coordinates: 51°56′N 4°47′E
- Country: Netherlands
- Province: South Holland
- Municipality: Krimpenerwaard

Area
  - Total: 38.06 km^{2} (14.70 sq mi)
  - Land: 35.10 km^{2} (13.55 sq mi)
  - Water: 2.96 km^{2} (1.14 sq mi)
- Elevation: 1 m (3.3 ft)

Population (January 2021)
  - Total: 10.016
- Time zone: UTC+1 (CET)
  - Summer (DST): UTC+2 (CEST)
- Postcode: 2825, 2860–2861, 2865
- Area code: 0182
- Website: www.bergambacht.nl

Bergambacht (Dutch pronunciation: [bɛrxˈɑmbɑxt] or [bɛrəxˈʔɑmbɑxt]) is a village and former municipality in the western Netherlands, in the province of South Holland. Since 2015 it has been a part of the municipality of Krimpenerwaard.

The former municipality covered an area of 38.06 km^{2} (14.70 sq mi) of which 2.96 km^{2} (1.14 sq mi) was water, and had a population of data missing as of 2021. The former municipality included the communities of Ammerstol and Berkenwoude, which were separate municipalities until they merged with Bergambacht in 1985.

== Topography ==
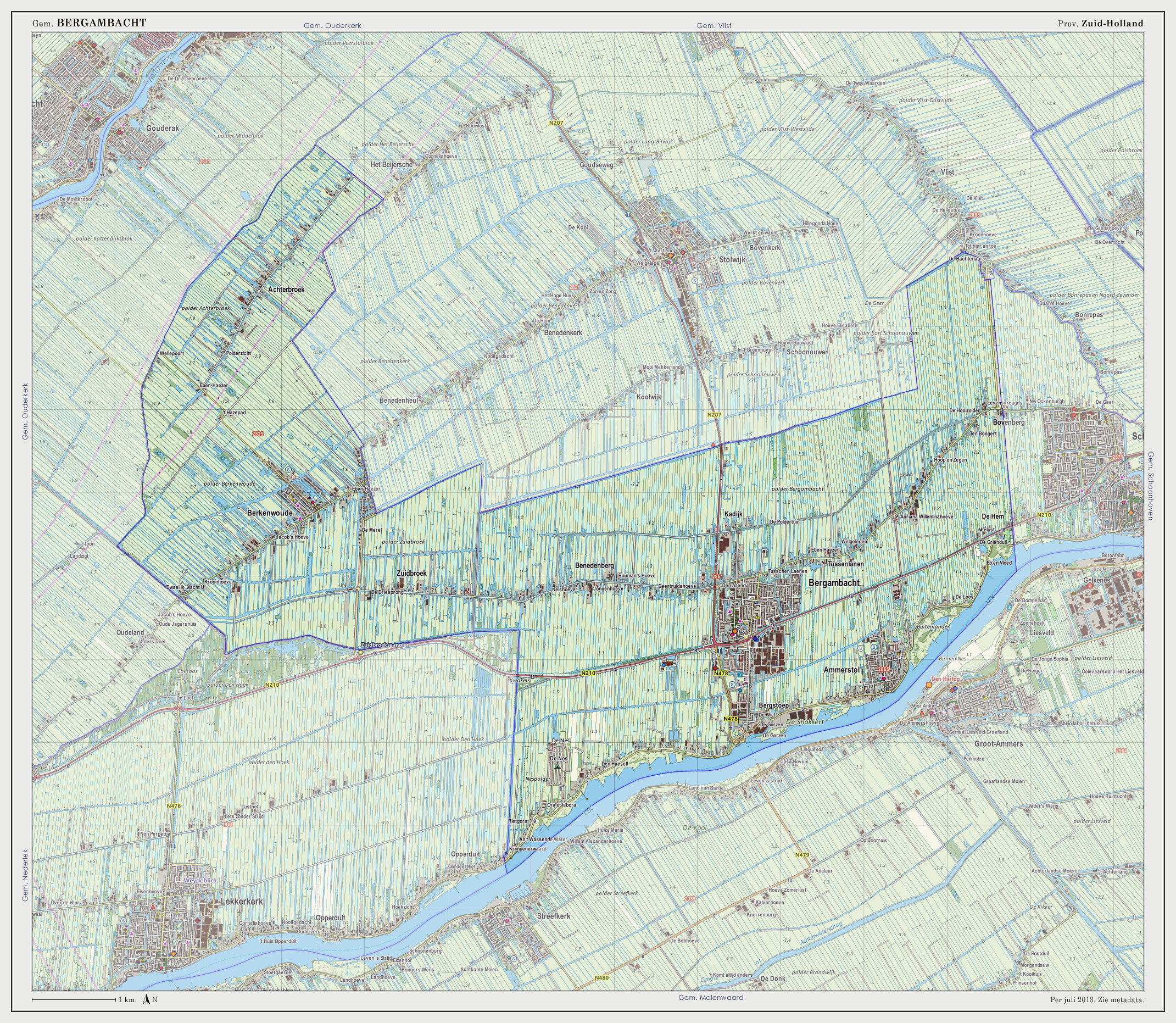

Topographic map of the former municipality of Bergambacht, 2013.

== Notable people ==
- Wim Kok (1938-2018), trade union leader and politician; Prime Minister of the Netherlands 1994-2002
- Meindert Leerling (1936–2021), journalist and politician
