= Schoonhoven =

- City and former municipality
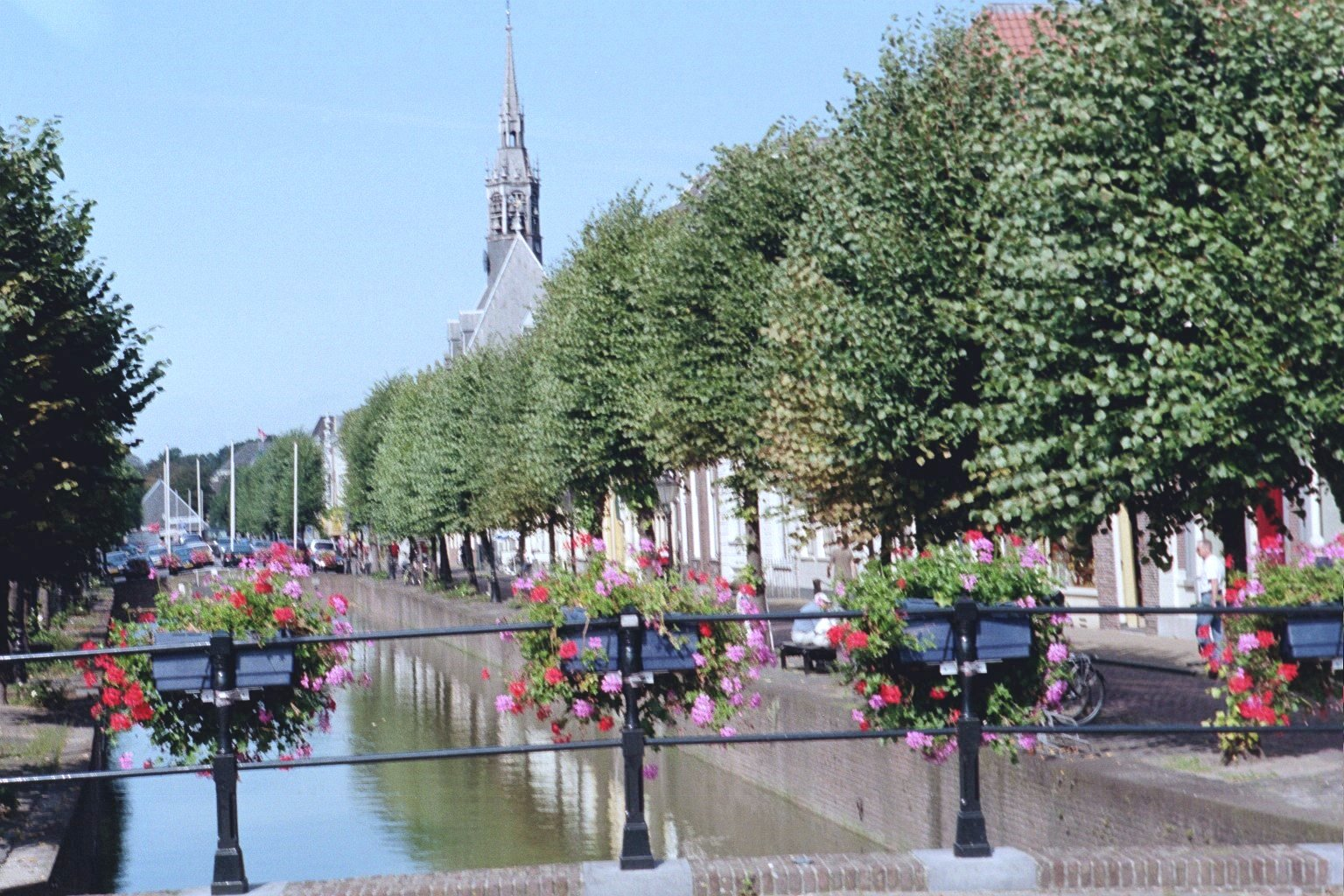
- Canal in Schoonhoven

- Flag Coat of arms

- Location in South Holland
- Coordinates: 51°57′N 4°51′E
- Country: Netherlands
- Province: South Holland
- Municipality: Krimpenerwaard

Area
  - Total: 6.92 km^{2} (2.67 sq mi)
  - Land: 6.27 km^{2} (2.42 sq mi)
  - Water: 0.65 km^{2} (0.25 sq mi)
- Elevation: 3 m (9.8 ft)

Population (2023)
  - Total: 13,570
- Source: CBS, Statline.
- Demonym: Schoonhovenaar
- Time zone: UTC+1 (CET)
  - Summer (DST): UTC+2 (CEST)
- Postcode: 2870–2871
- Area code: 0182
- Website: www.schoonhoven.info

Schoonhoven (Dutch pronunciation: [ˈsxoːnˌɦoːvə(n)]) is a city and was a former municipality in the western Netherlands, in the province of South Holland. Since 2015 it has been a part of the municipality of Krimpenerwaard, before it had been an independent municipality.

The former municipality had a population of data missing in 2021, and covered an area of 6.92 km^{2} (2.67 sq mi) of which 0.65 km^{2} (0.25 sq mi) water. From 2010 to 2014, it was the smallest municipality in the Netherlands in land area, following the merger of Rozenburg into Rotterdam.

The first winner of the Dutch version of Pop Idol, Jamai Loman, is from this city. Also Jan-Arie van der Heijden, football player for Feyenoord, lives in Schoonhoven.

== History ==
c. 1220 a castle was built on the north side of a small stream called "Zevender", near its mouth at the Lek River. The town Schoonhoven was then formed near the castle. The oldest reference to the town is in a document from 1247, where it is referred to as Sconhoven. In 1280, it was granted town rights.

Around 1350, walls and gates were constructed around the city. The city's economy depended on shipping, brewing, fishing and agriculture. Schoonhoven was also the marketplace for the region. In 1518, the castle burned down and its remains were removed in subsequent decades.

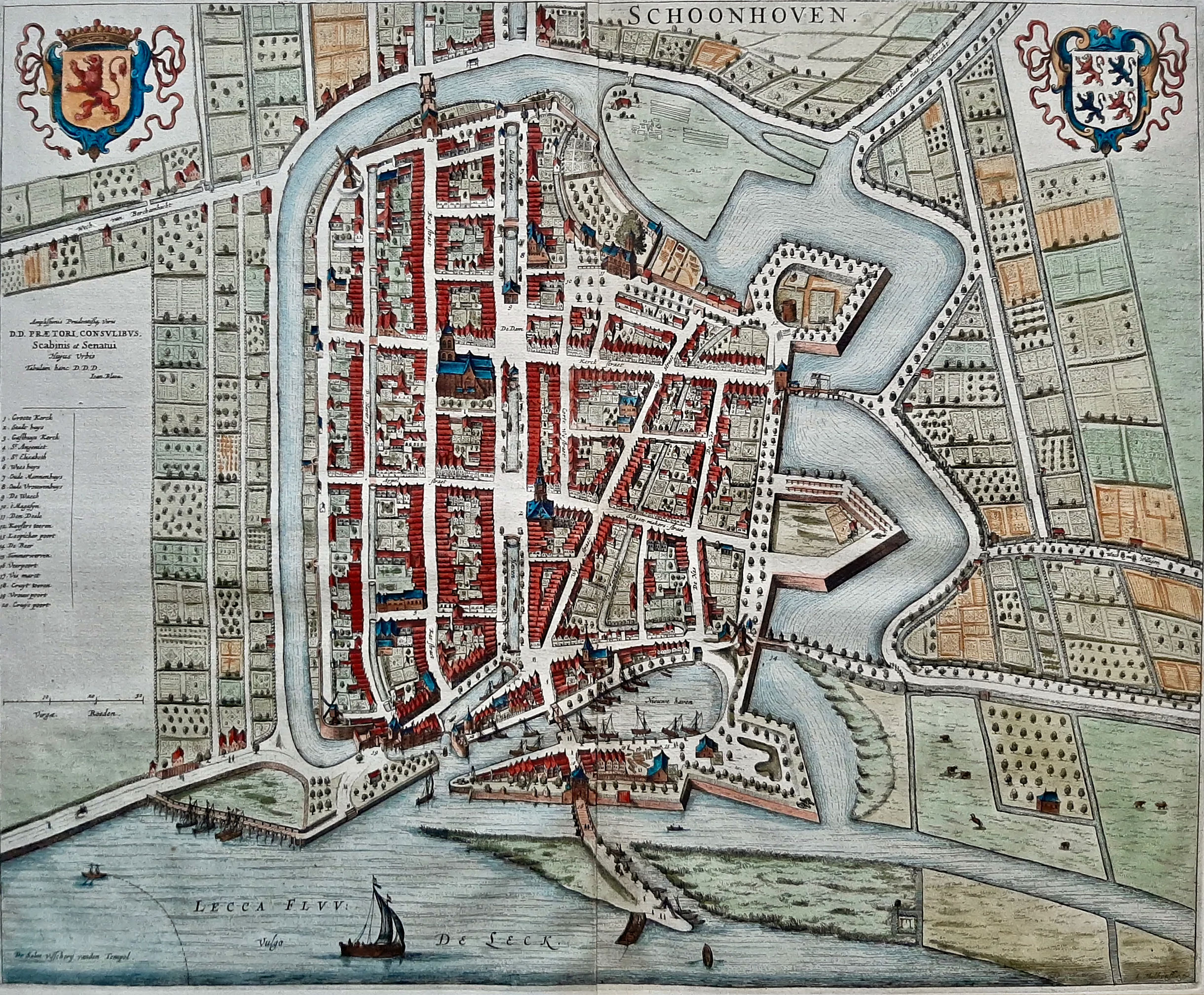
Schoonhoven in 1652 by Joan Blaeu

Between 1582 and 1601 the city's defense walls were renewed and expanded to include the shipyards as well. At this point, the fortifications mainly faced eastward (as can be seen on the 1652 map of Schoonhoven by Joan Blaeu), because of the historically strategical location on the border between the County of Holland and the Bishopric of Utrecht. Following the Disaster Year of 1672, they were reinforced once again and expanded on the west and north sides. Yet in 1816, when bastion fortifications were no longer relevant to the warfare of the time, they were mostly demolished and made way for a cemetery and a park. Nowadays, most of the town walls and gates too have disappeared. The only remaining medieval entrance gate of Schoonhoven is the Veerpoort (Ferry Gate) that faces the Lek River. This Veerpoort has protected Schoonhoven from the floods of the river Rhine and from the sea during the devastating North Sea flood of 1953 and is still fully functional as a water barrier today.

By 1860, the city had 2900 inhabitants. Not until the middle of the 20th century did the city expand beyond the former fortress limits; firstly in a north-westerly direction, and then eastward since the 1990s.

== Tourism and attractions ==
Schoonhoven is known for its silver and therefore carries the nickname: Zilverstad ("Silver City"). Since the 17th century, silver and gold smiths have been working here. Today, Schoonhoven is still known for its silver. It is the host of "Het Nederlands Zilvermuseum" (the Dutch Silver Museum) and the International Silver School.

Schoonhoven is also known for is its production of clocks. There still is a variety of clock makers in Schoonhoven, some of which can be visited. A beautiful example of a large clockwork is the Van den Gheyn Beiaard in the tower of the medieval town hall of Schoonhoven.

The city is a popular stop for inland cruise ships, especially during the summer period. Tourists are often offered a guided tour of the city and its museums, or a relaxing cycling day trip through Schoonhoven's rural surroundings. The city is also popular among Dutch day-trippers and bicycle tourers. The grassy polders of the Krimpenerwaard, Lopikerwaard and Alblasserwaard surrounding the city of Schoonhoven are home to a magnificent variety of birds such as storks.

Popular events that take place in Schoonhoven include the annual well-visited Silver day (Zilverdag) on Whit Monday and "Spookhoven", a celebration of Halloween. Also, Koningsdag and the arrival of Sinterklaas are celebrated each year.

Schoonhoven has two main shopping streets with a variety of shops and boutiques. There are several restaurants and bars, as well as a hotel and a discotheque.

== Transport ==
Schoonhoven lies in the middle of the Dutch Green Heart (Groene Hart), which is mostly a rural area with a relatively low population density. It therefore has no railway connection (although there was a tram connection with Gouda from 1914 until 1942, when it was broken up by the German Nazi authorities) and lacks a direct connection to a motorway. The city can be reached within half an hour from the major cities of Rotterdam and Utrecht via the N210 road, and from Gouda via the N207. It also has a frequent bus connection (lines 395 and 497) with these cities. Amsterdam is about an hour away by car.

A ferry transporting both vehicles and pedestrians across the Lek River connects Schoonhoven with Gelkenes in the municipality of Molenwaard. From here, the cities of Gorinchem, Dordrecht and the town of Kinderdijk can each be reached within half an hour.

== Gallery ==
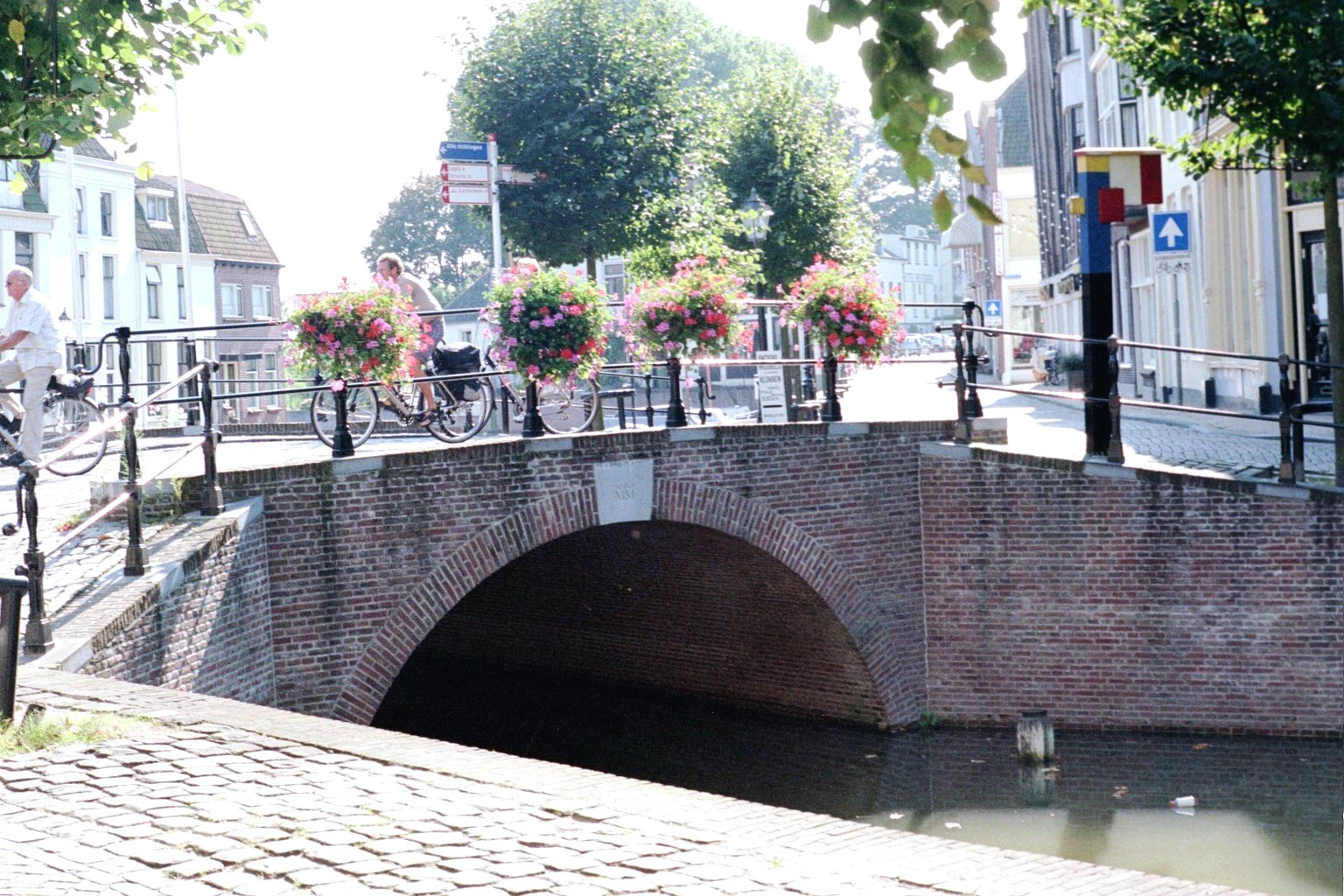
Bridge over the main canal

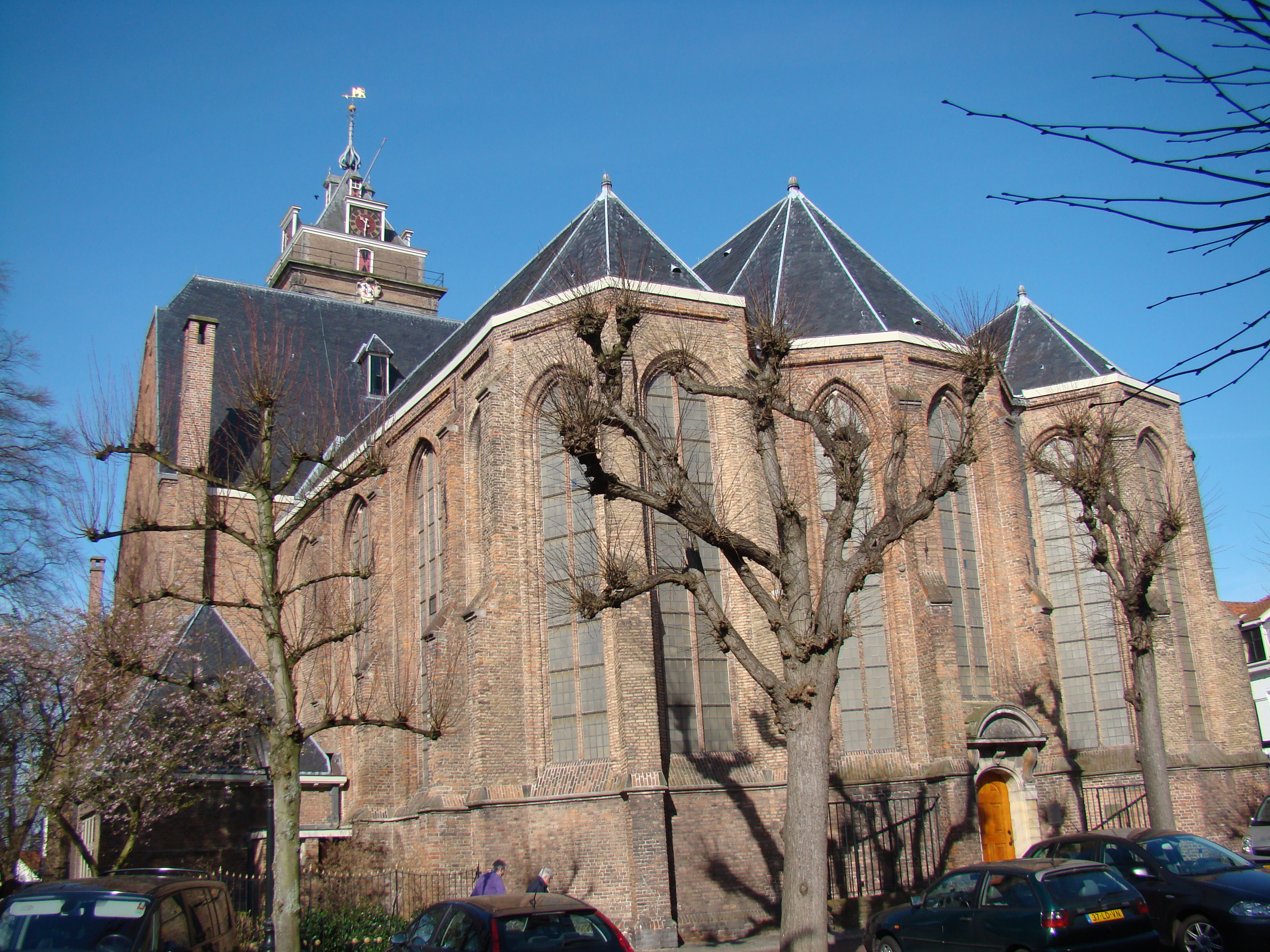
Bartholomew church

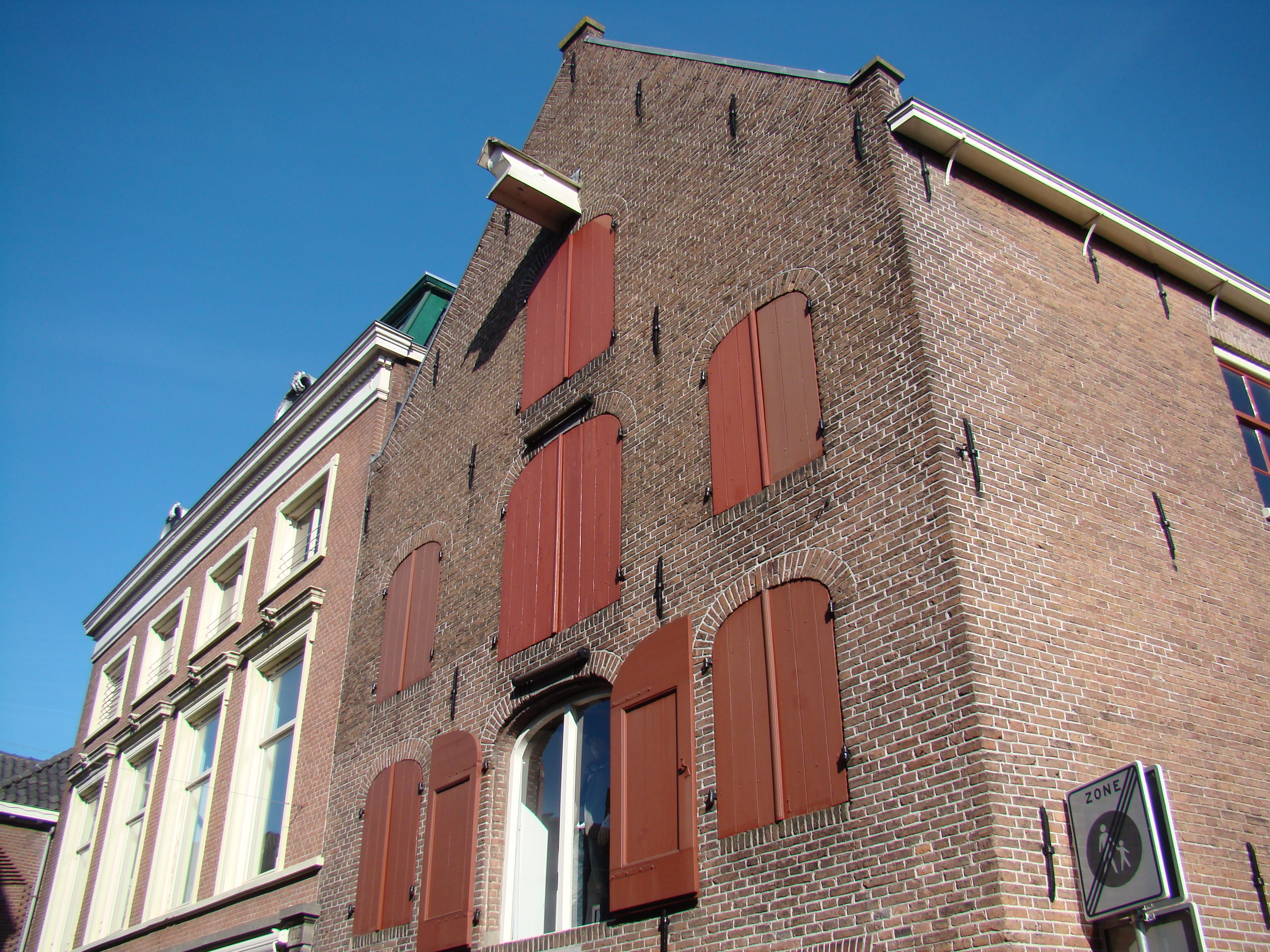
Old warehouse

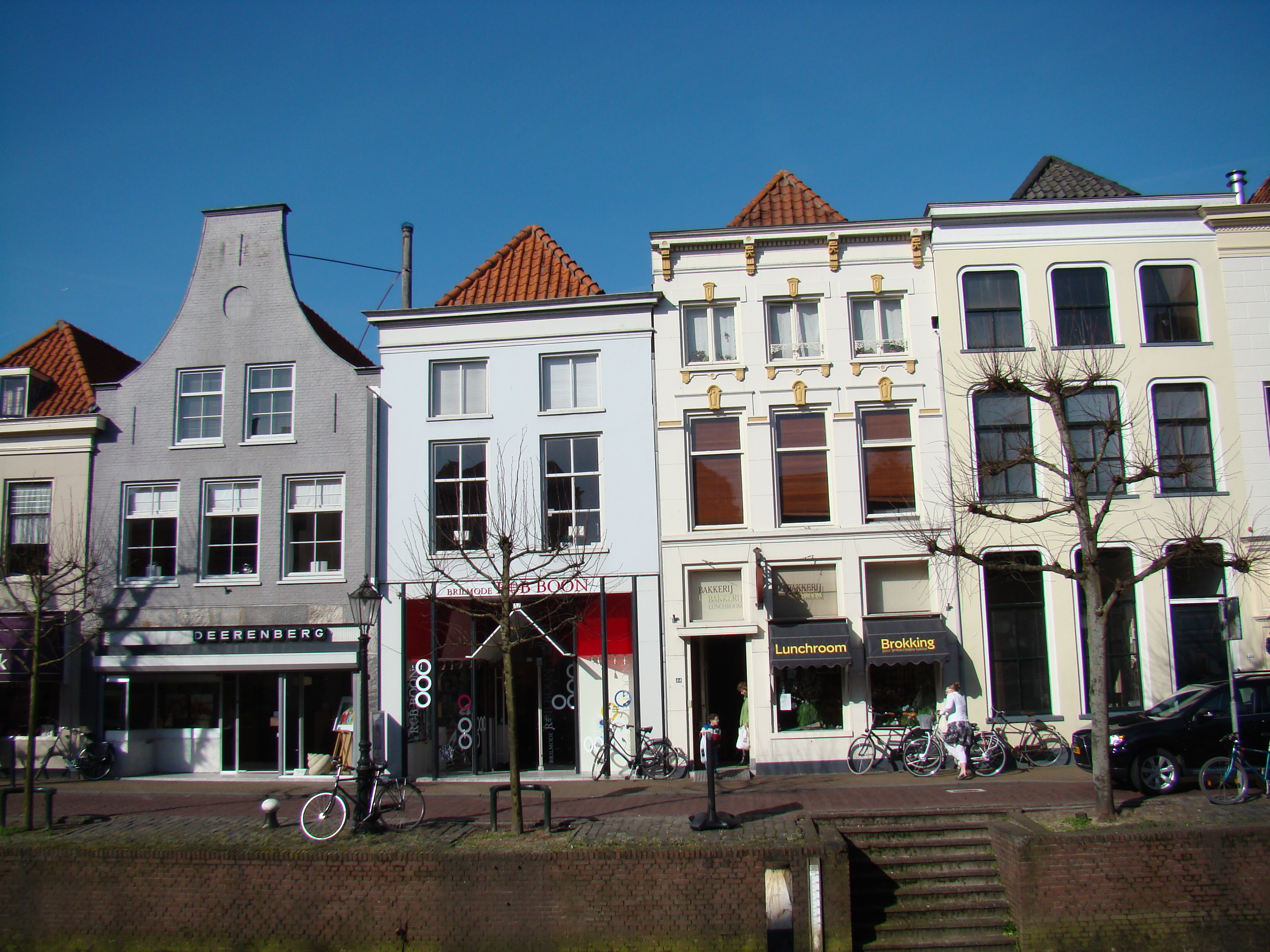
Canal houses

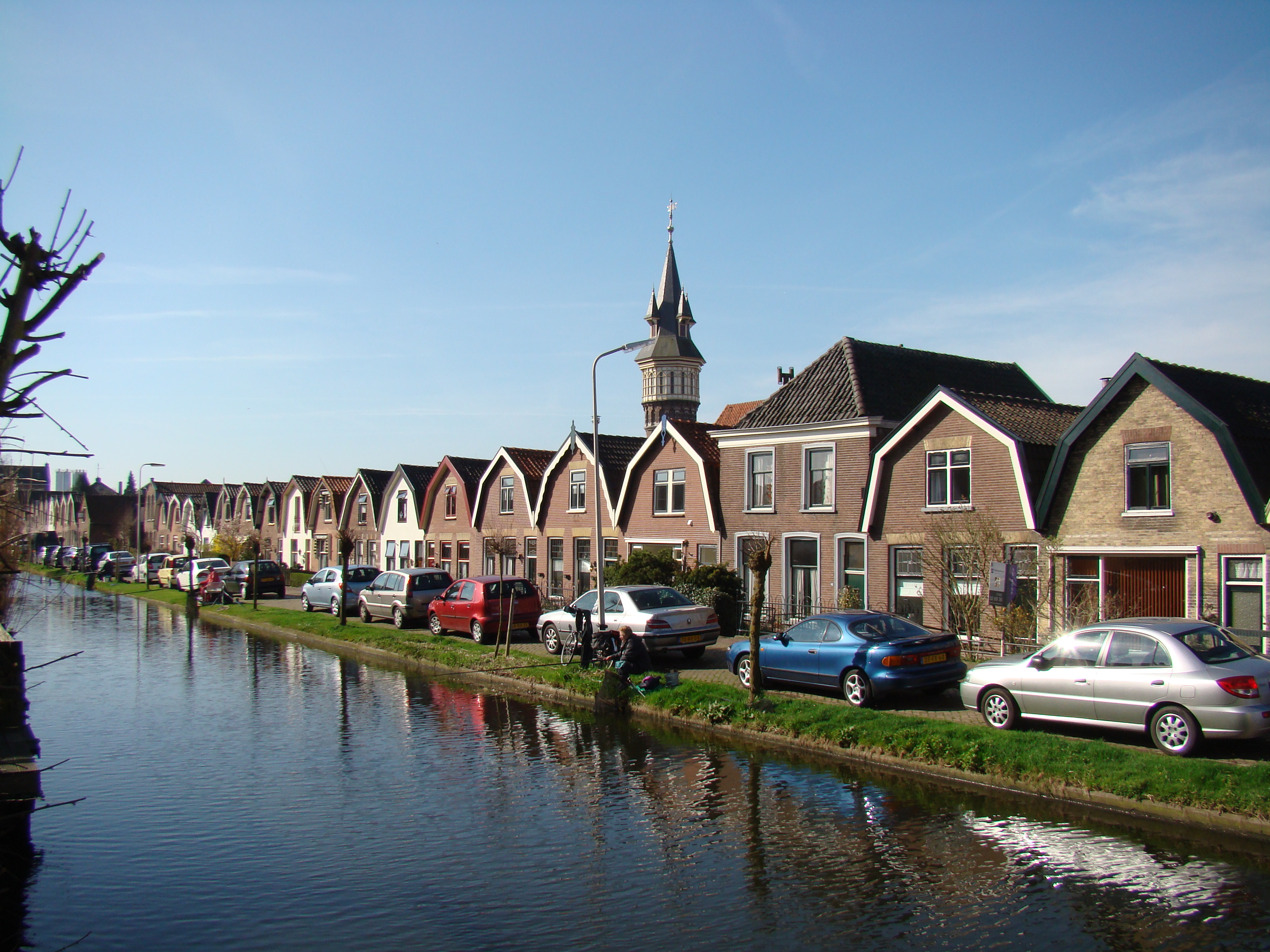
Gracht

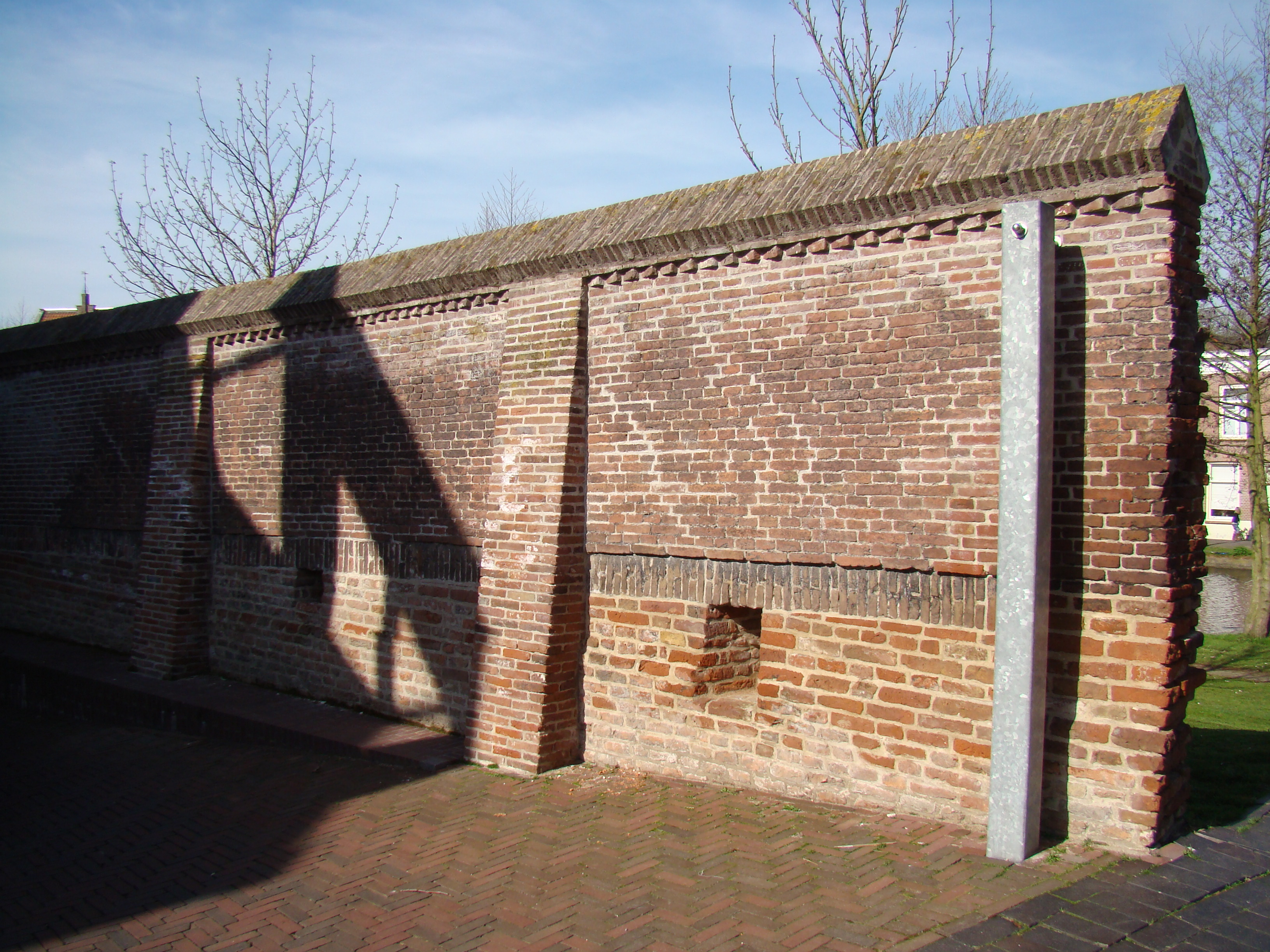
Remnants of the town walls

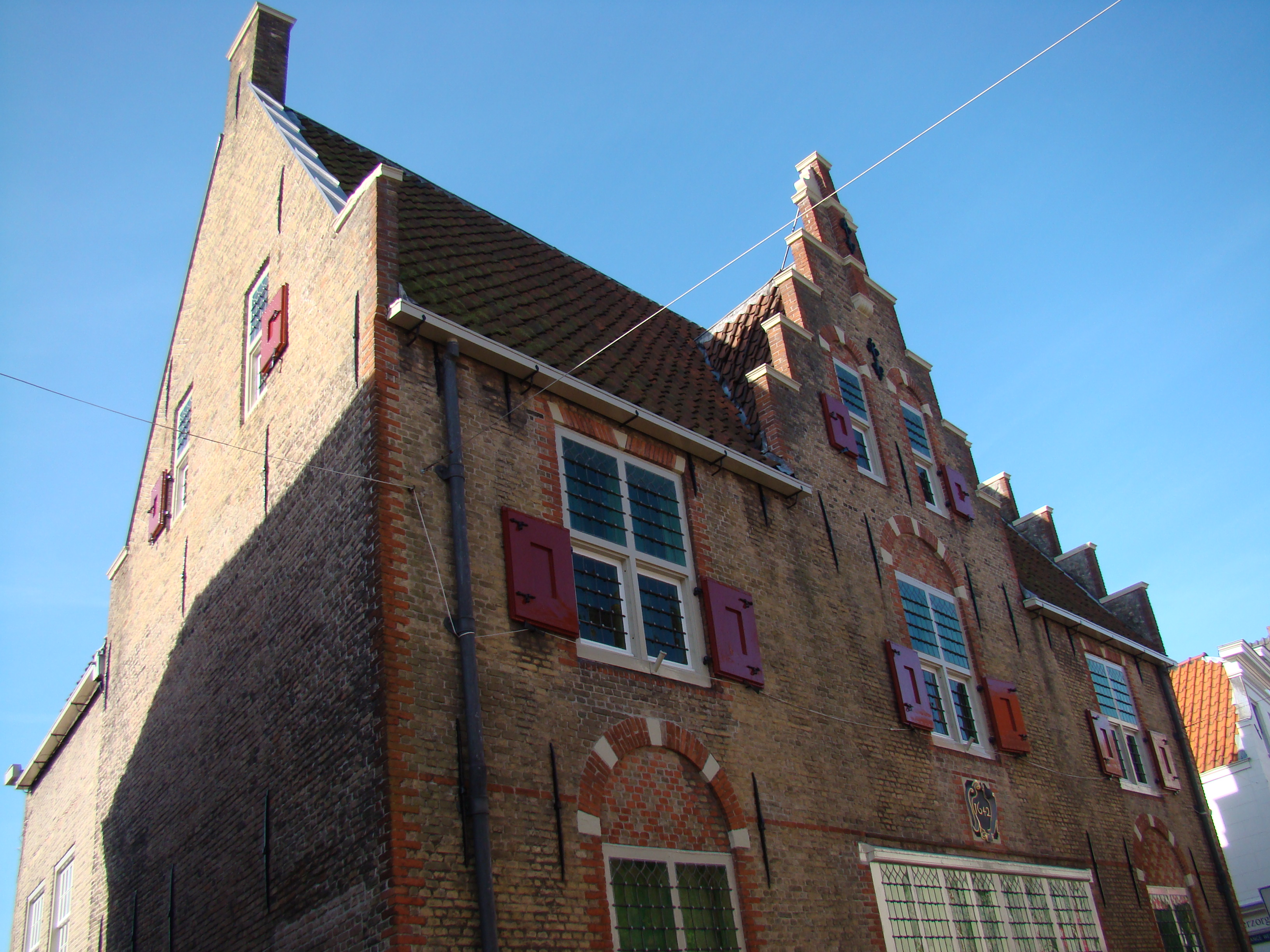
17th century house

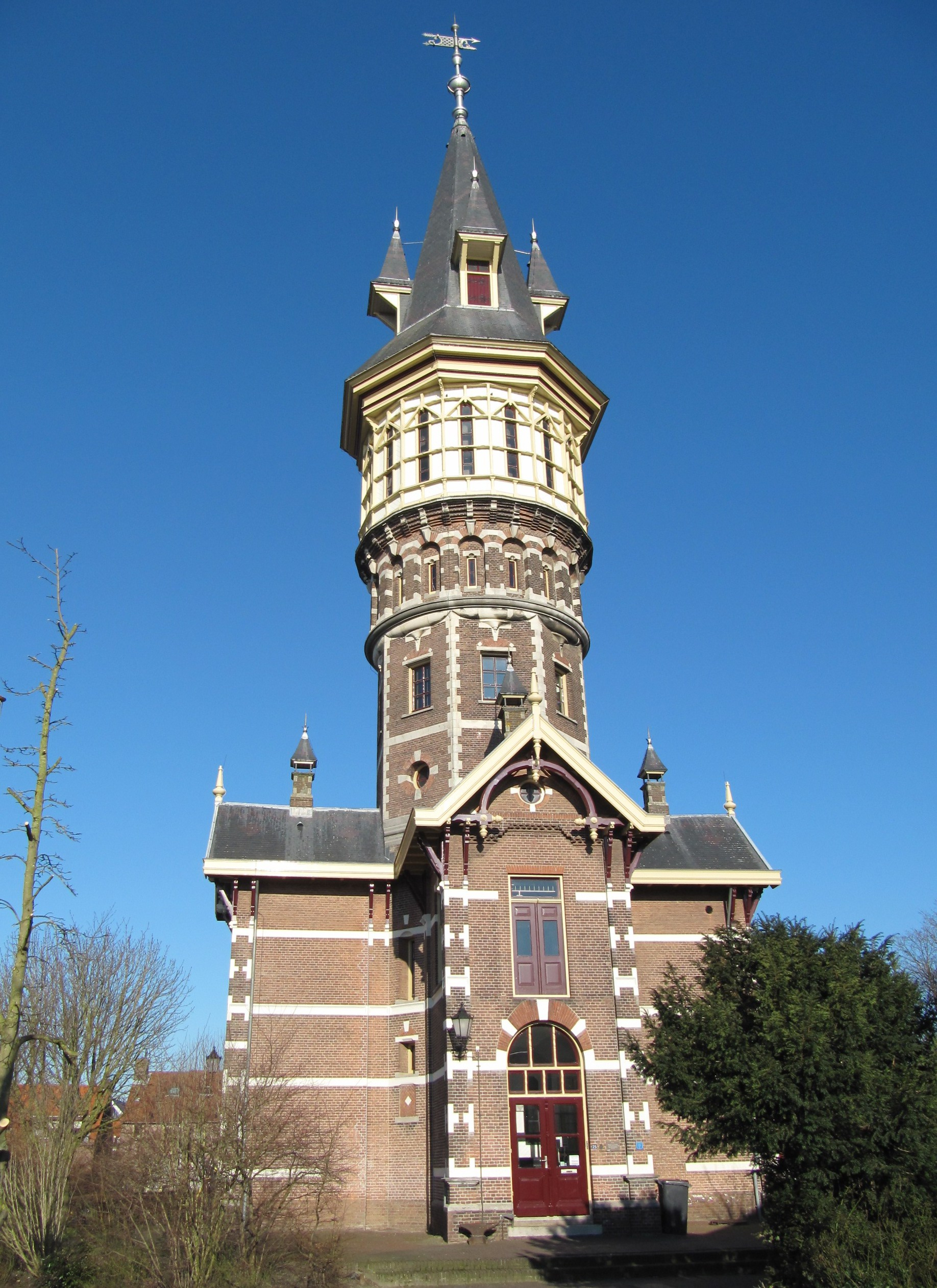
Water tower

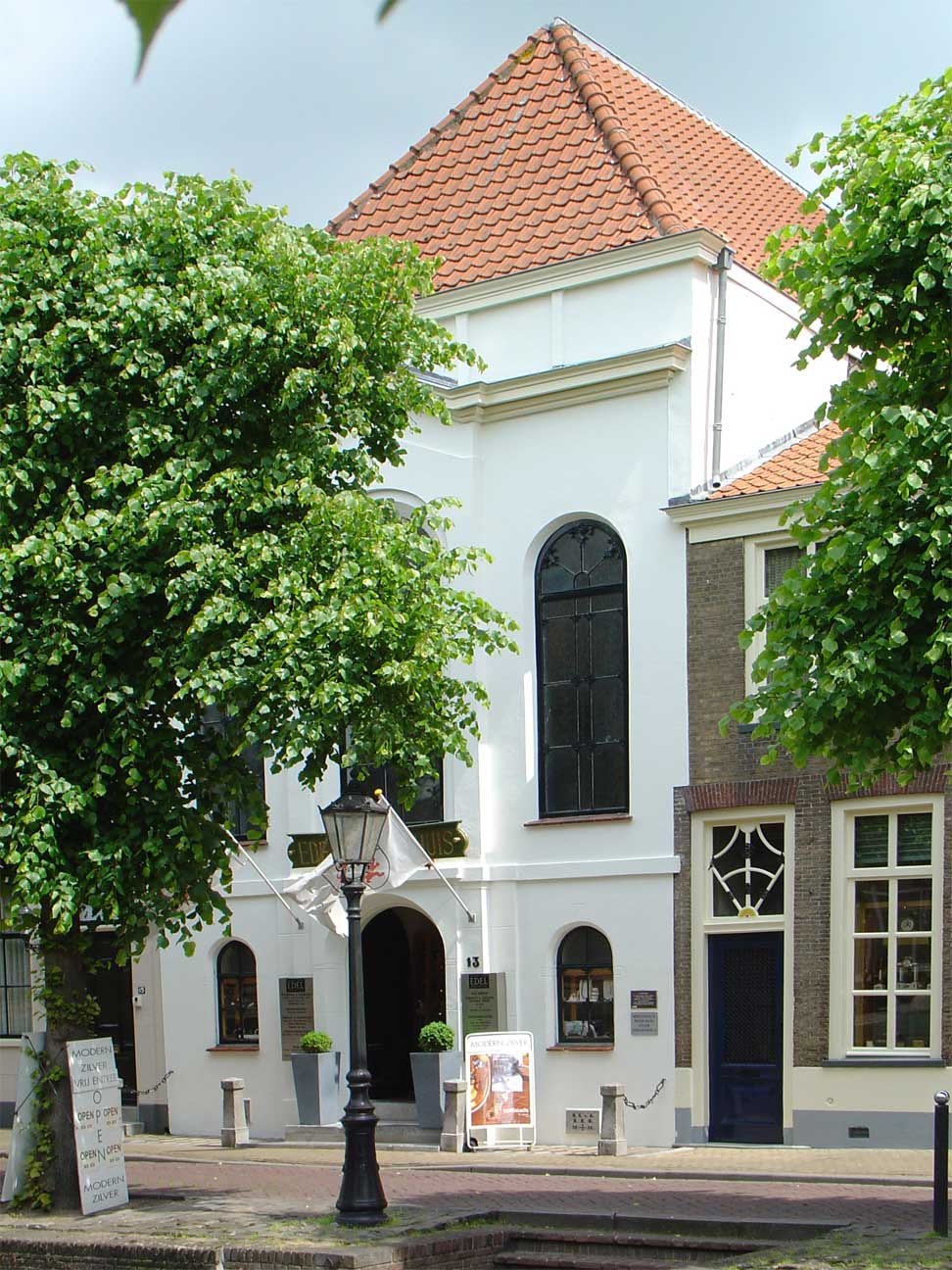
Synagogue

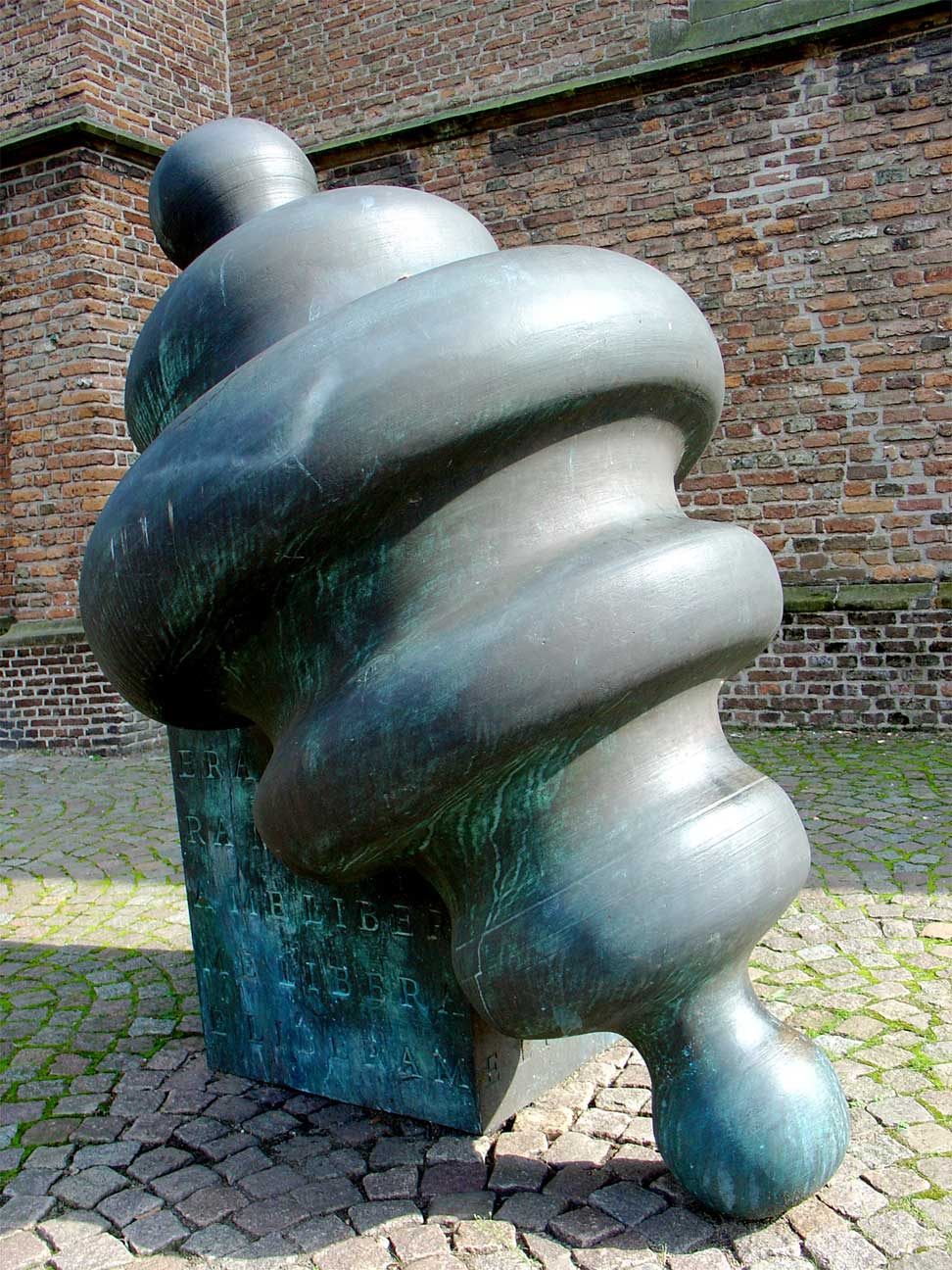
Libera me by Dorothé Jehoel

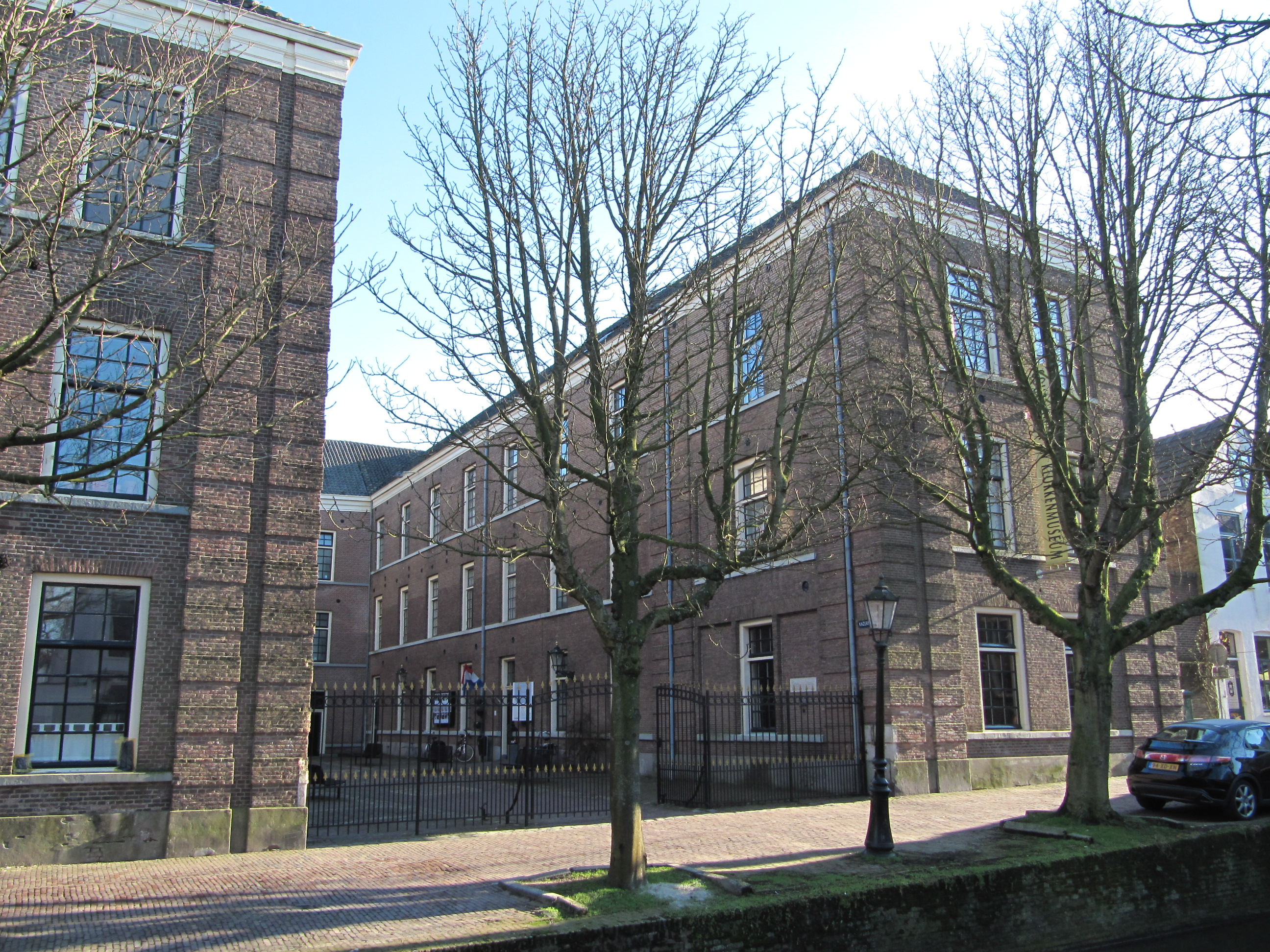
The Nederlands Zilvermuseum

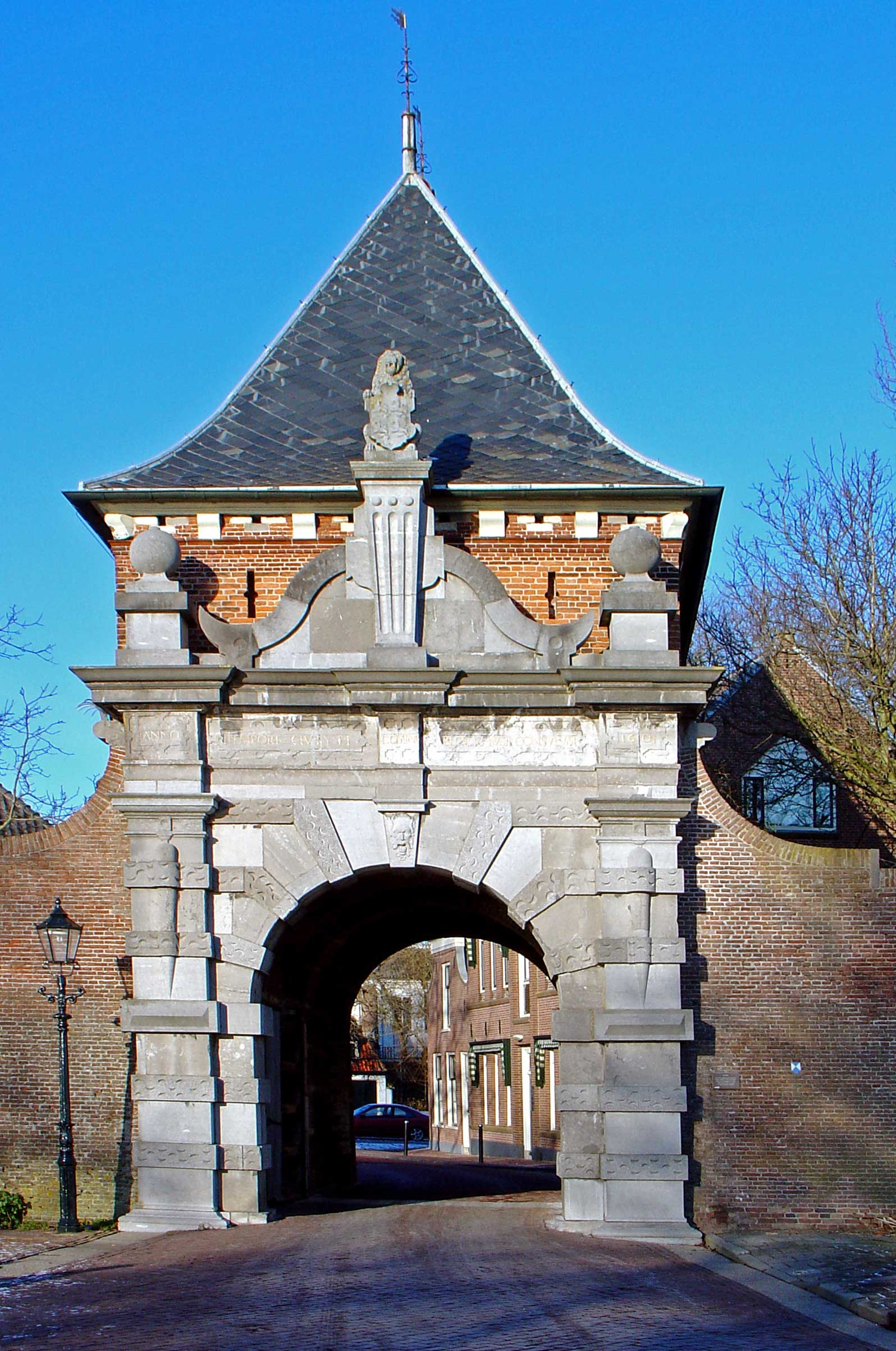
Ferry gate (Veerpoort)

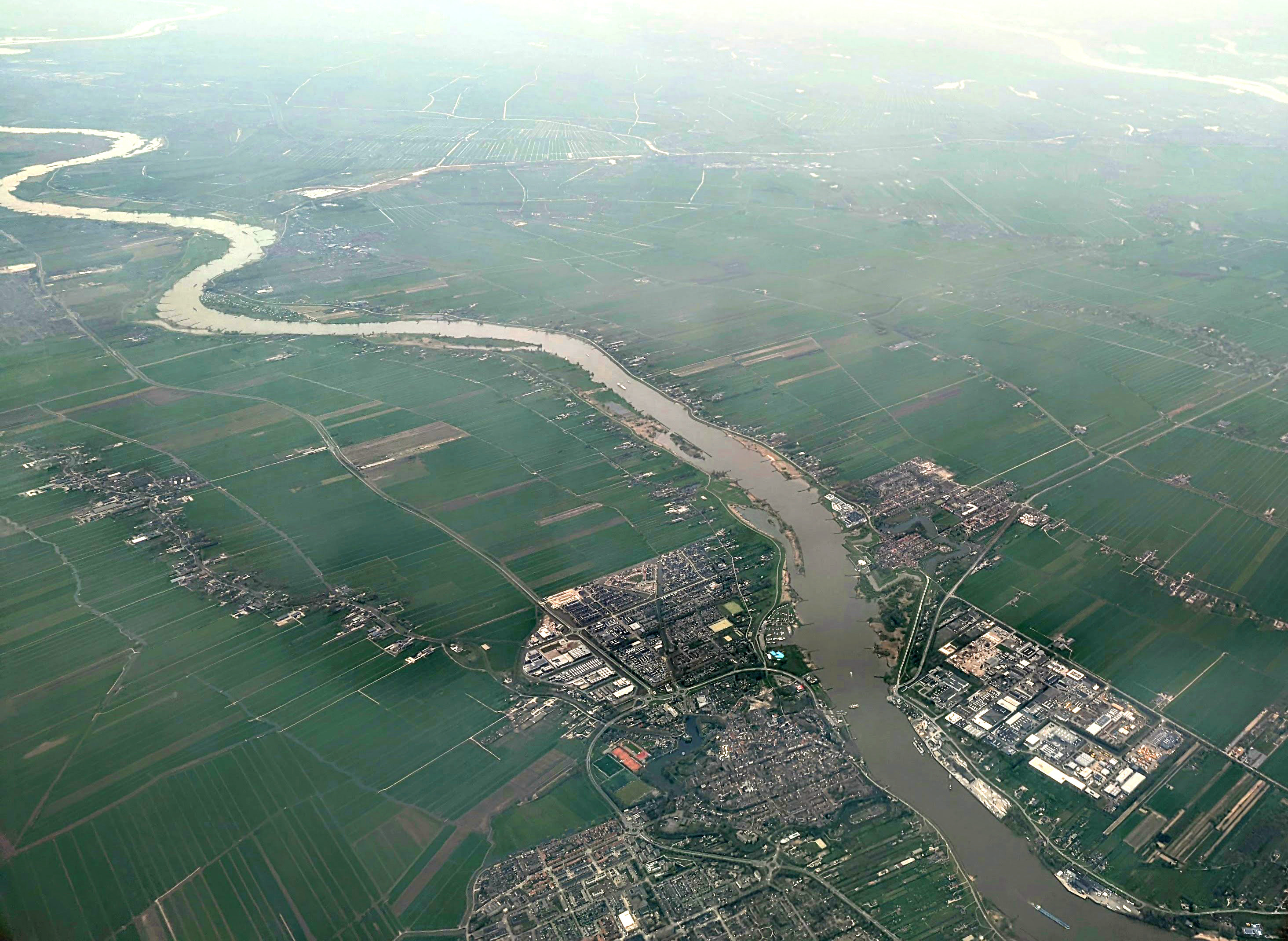
Aerial view of Schoonhoven and Nieuwpoort, on the Lek

== Notable people ==
- Martin van Bruinessen, Dutch anthropologist.
- Clara de Vries, Dutch jazz trumpeter.
- Rick Karsdorp, Dutch professional footballer.
- Olivier van Noort, the first Dutchman to circumnavigate the world. His statue can be found outside the ferry gate, overlooking the river.

== Trivia ==
- Schoonhoven, being a fortified town, was part of the Old Hollandic Water Line.
