= Maryland (disambiguation) =

Maryland is a state in the Mid-Atlantic region of the United States.

Maryland or Marylands or Mary-Land, may also refer to:

== Places ==
=== Africa ===
- Maryland, a district of Lagos, Nigeria
- Maryland County, Liberia
  - Republic of Maryland, the Liberian county when it was an independent nation

=== Europe ===
- Maryland (Russia) or Marimland, a territory between Vetluga and Vyatka rivers, inhabited by Mari people
- Maryland, Brownsea Island, an abandoned village in Dorset, England, UK
- Maryland, London, an area of Newham, London, England, United Kingdom
- Maryland, Monmouthshire, Wales, United Kingdom
- Maryland, an English rendering of Terra Mariana, a medieval Crusader state in the Baltic
- Marylands Nature Reserve, a Local Nature Reserve in Hockley, Essex, England, UK
- Marylands, a country house in Surrey, England, UK

=== North America ===
- Maryland City, Maryland, a census-designated place in the U.S. state
- Province of Maryland, the U.S. state when it was an English colony
- Maryland, New York, United States, a town
- Maryland Manor, a neighborhood in Tampa, Florida
- Maryland Heights, Missouri, a suburb in Missouri.

=== Elsewhere ===
- Maryland, New South Wales, near Newcastle, Australia
- Maryland National Park, a National Park in New South Wales, Australia
- Maryland, a crater on Thule, the smaller lobe of the Kuiper belt object 486958 Arrokoth

== People with the name ==
- William Lutwiniak, who used the pseudonym "Mary Land"
- Russell Maryland, a former NFL football player

== Arts, entertainment, and media ==
- "Maryland, My Maryland", former state song of the U.S. state of Maryland
- Maryland (1940 film), an American film
- Maryland (2015 film) or Disorder, a French film
- Maryland (TV series), a British 2023 television series
- My Maryland, a "musical romance"

== Brands and enterprises ==
- Maryland (cigarette), a Luxembourgish brand
- Maryland Cookies, a brand of biscuits produced by Burton's Foods in the United Kingdom

== Education ==
- Marylands School, a school in Christchurch, New Zealand
- University System of Maryland
  - University of Maryland, Baltimore, also known as "Maryland Medical School" and "Maryland Law School"
  - University of Maryland, Baltimore County, specialising in science and engineering
  - University of Maryland, College Park, the flagship campus
  - University of Maryland Eastern Shore, located in Princess Anne, Maryland
  - University of Maryland University College, campus located in Adelphi, Maryland, for adults and distance learning

== Sports ==
- Baltimore Marylands, a short-lived 19th-century baseball team
- Maryland GAA, a Gaelic Athletic Association football team based in Drumraney, County Westmeath, Ireland
- Maryland Terrapins, the athletic program of the University of Maryland, College Park

== Transportation and vehicular ==
- Maryland (automobile), a car produced in Baltimore, Maryland, 1907–1910
- Martin model 167 Maryland, an American WW2 medium bomber

=== Ships ===
- MV Maryland (1958), a cutter of the Maryland Pilotage Company
- SS Maryland, the name of several steamships
- USS Maryland, a U.S. Navy shipname
  - USS Maryland (1799), a Napoleonic War sloop
  - USS Maryland (ACR-8), a WW1 era Pennsylvania-class cruiser
  - USS Maryland (BB-46), a WW2 era Colorado-class battleship
  - USS Maryland (SSBN-738), an Ohio-class submarine

== Other uses ==
- Chicken Maryland, a historic fried chicken dish

== See also ==
- Queen Mary Land, Antarctica
- Mary (disambiguation)
- Land (disambiguation)
