= SS Maryland =

SS Maryland is the name of the following ships:

- SS Maryland (1890), served on the Great Lakes, sank 26 December 1916
- SS Maryland (1913), scrapped in 1933
- SS Maryland (1921), sunk by U-39 on 15 February 1940

== See also ==
- Maryland (disambiguation)
- MV Maryland
- USS Maryland
