= J. & K. Smit =

Dutch shipbuilding company

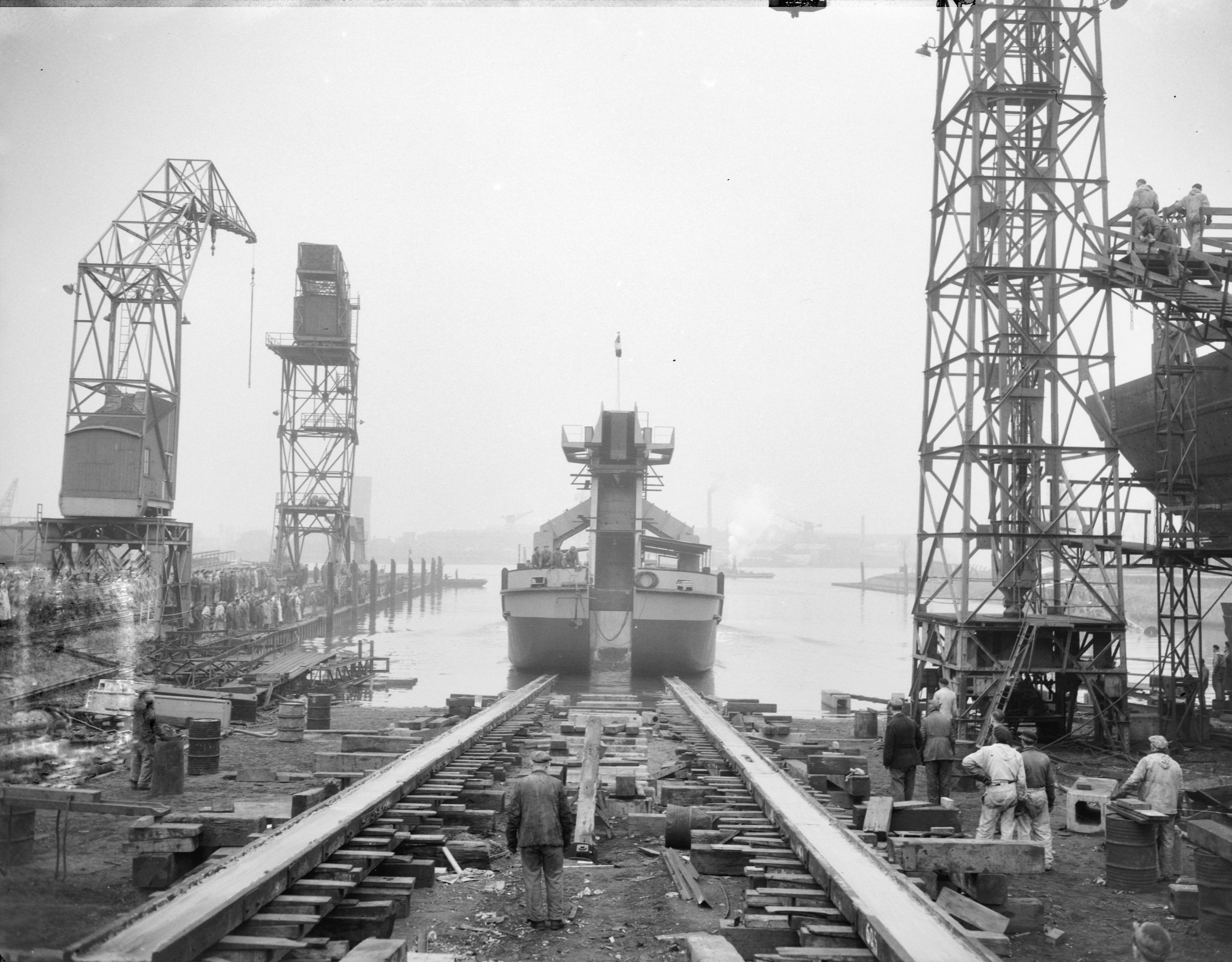
- Launch of a bucket dredger in January 1954
- Industry: Shipbuilding
- Founded: 1847
- Fate: Merged into IHC Holland in 1965
- Headquarters: Kinderdijk, Krimpen aan de Lek, Netherlands
- Key people: J. Smit Jzn., K. Smit Jzn, Murk Lels
- Products: Dredging vessels, Inland navigation ships

J. & K. Smit was a Dutch shipbuilding company located in Kinderdijk and Krimpen aan de Lek. Its successor is now part of Royal IHC.

== Context ==
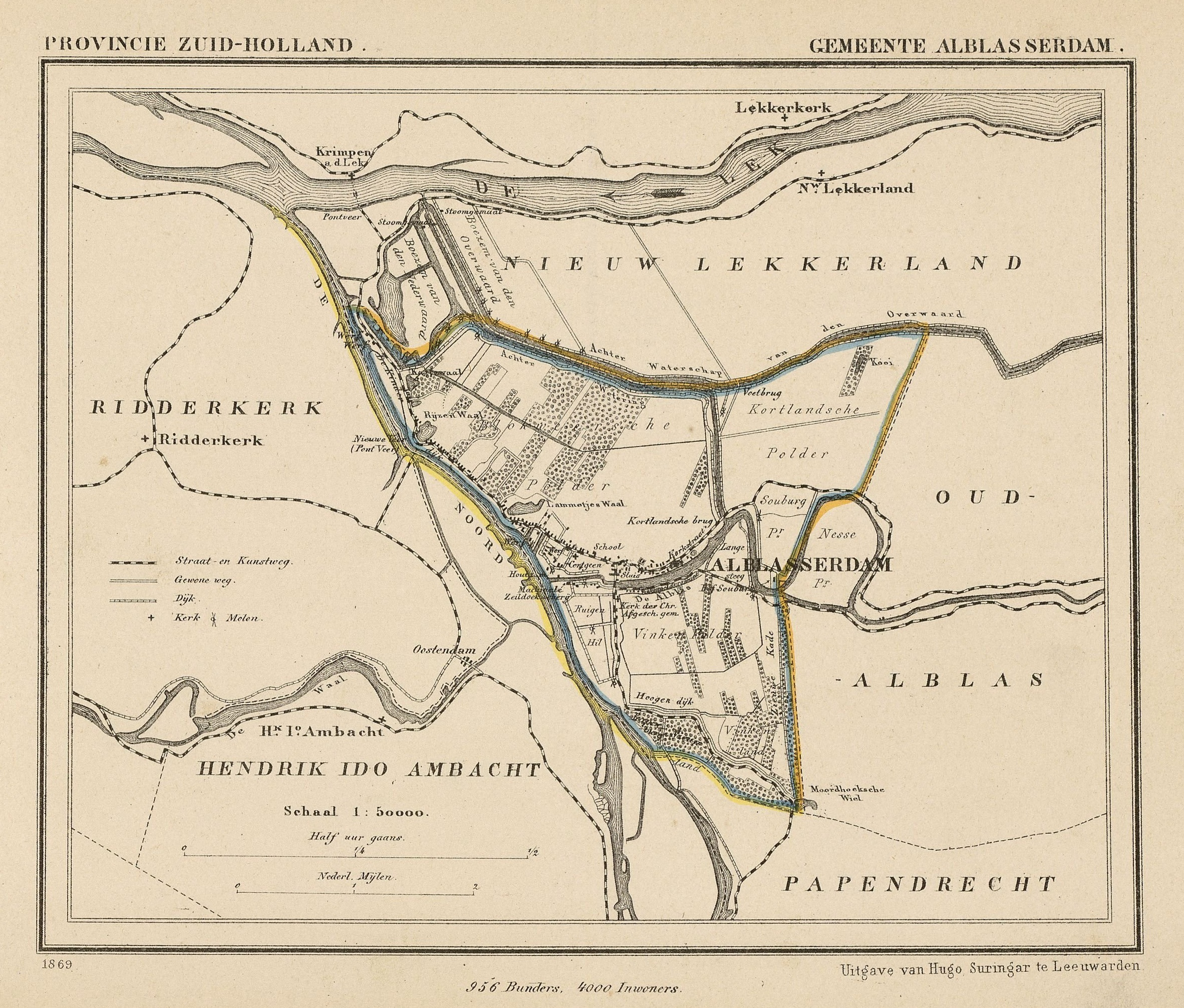
Kinderdijk location near Nieuw-Lekkerland

J. & K. Smit shipyard was one of multiple shipyard belonging to the Smit family. In 1785 Jan Foppe Smit (1742-1807) and his brother Jakus took over a shipyard in Alblasserdam, near the border with Nieuw-Lekkerland.

After they were established, Jakus built another shipyard north of the one they had, and after he left in about 1800, this was joined to the family business. Jan Foppe's oldest son Fop then joined the business. By 1805 it had 10 workers, and build rivercraft, some of them of the smallest type. On his death, Jan Foppe was wealthy. He had two shipyards, several houses, 18 hectares of land multiple (parts in) ships, as well as many securities. He had three sons and two daughters:

- Fop Smit (1777-1866)
- Jan Smit (1779-1869) inherited his father's shipyard in Alblasserdam, and worked in partnership with Fop from 1824 to 1828
- Cornelis Smit (1784-1858) Founded his own shipyards near the harbor of Alblasserdam and in Zierikzee, and a patent slip in Papendrecht.

Jan Smit married Teuntje Rijs in 1814. They had 10 children, of these:

- Ottolina Smit (1822-1898) married Murk Lels in 1846
- Jan Smit (1824-1911) married Johanna Maria de Jager in 1847
- Kornelis Smit (1826-1910) married Geertruida Gerarda Aalbers in 1849

== Foundations ==
=== Jan Smit, Kornelis Smit and Murk Lels ===
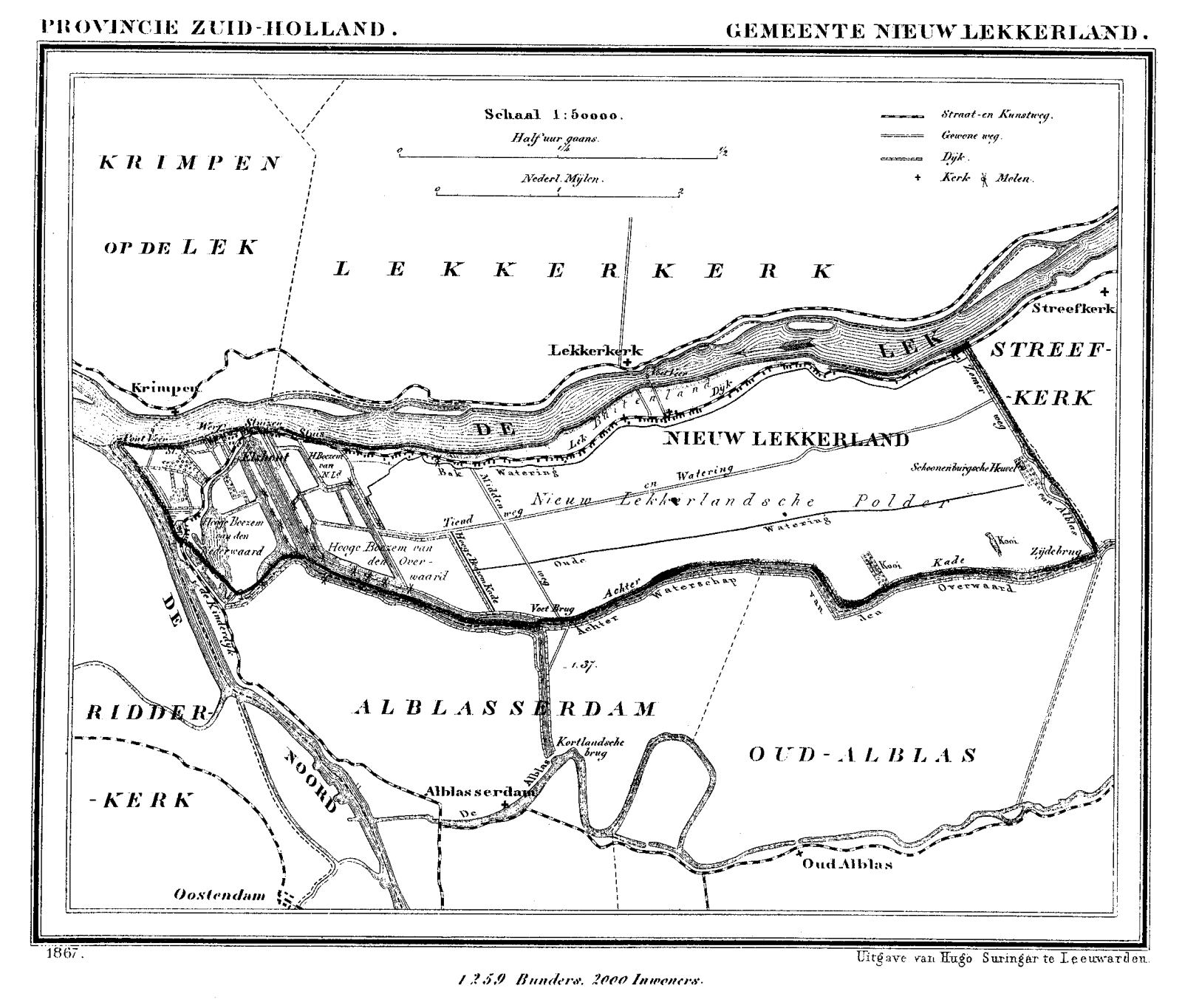
Nieuw-Lekkerland map

Jan Smit and Kornelis Smit started two shipyards. The first was started in 1847 in Kinderdijk, municipality Nieuw-Lekkerland. The second was in Krimpen aan de Lek. Later, the first continued to be managed by Jan, while the Krimpen aan de Lek shipyard was managed by Kornelis.

Murk Lels (1823-1891) was born in a family of seamen from Frisia. He had gone to sea at age 14, but stayed on shore since 1845. He became the brother in law of Jan en Kornelis Smit by marrying their sister Ottolina. Murk became the manager of a shipping line to the Dutch East Indies for which J. & K. Smit built about 10 ships. By 1869 he managed 9 ships of 7,248 ton. Murk lived in the Huis te Kinderdijk. In 1864 he founded De Coningh, Carst en Lels in Kanagawa, later known as Carst, Lels & Co. in Yokohama. He also traded a lot with China, and founded the coffee company Bendo in Banyuwangi on Java.

=== Shipyard in Kinderdijk ===
The first ships built show just how important Murk Lels was. On 30 August 1848 the J. & K. Smit shipyard on the Kinderdijk launched the Barque Eersteling ('the first') of 450 Java lasts, for the shipping line Murk Lels from Kinderdijk. When this ship sank on its first trip, it did not deter Murk. On 30 August 1849 the Barque Kinderdijk of 357 lasts (laid down 30 August 1848) was launched for the same. On 26 April 1851 the shipyard in Kinderdijk launched Cornelis Smit of 400 last for Murk Leis in Alblasserdam. On 7 April 1852 the barque Otto of 371 last was launched in Kinderdijk for Murk Lels.

The next years show that J. & K. Smit soon had two, possibly even three slipways in operation. On 19 May 1853 the barque Ottolina of 370 last was launched in Kinderdijk for Murk Lels. On 4 June 1853 the barque Luctor et Emergo of 300 last was launched for Borsius en van der Leije in Middelburg. On 9 August 1854 Susanna en Elisabeth of 390 last (laid down 28 June 1853) was launched for Borsius en van der Leije. On 17 August 1854 Egmond en Hoorne of 400 last (laid down 19 May 1853) was launched for E. Suermondt en Zn. en Co. from Rotterdam. On 15 March 1855 the barque Johanna en Geertuida of 400 lasts (laid down 5 August 1853) was launched for Murk Lels.

=== Shipyard in Krimpen aan de Lek ===
The shipyard in Krimpen aan de Lek was the first and only shipyard in that village, and was built in the summer of 1854. In November of that year the repair of the barque Padang was the first job for the shipyard. It soon after started to build ships. On 10 November 1856 the barque Krimpen aan de Lek of 380 last was launched in Krimpen for Murk Lels.

=== Dehulling mill ===
On 1 May 1854 K. Smit and B.J. Aalbers, Pelmolenaar (dehulling miller) both from Nieuw Lekkerland, started a partnership. The partnership would be a business in trading and dehulling cereals. In effect 'dehulling' was about dehulling barley, which has to be done before barley can be grinded. Since 1639 there were special wind mills in the Netherlands which could do this. However, this required a lot of force, and therefore a wind of at least 6 Beaufort. Already in February 1854 K. Smit had advertised for a machinist. It shows the entrepreneurial spirit of K. Smit and the role of family relations in their network. Kornelis married Geertruida Gerarda Aalbers in 1849. In 1887 a fully operational Stoompellerij (steam dehulling mill) was for sale in Kinderdijk.

== History of the privately owned company ==
=== Iron vessels ===
In 1855 J. & K. Smit got a prestigious assignment. On 21 July 1855 it laid down the iron steamers Telegraaph No. 1 and Telegraaph No. 2. These were meant for a fast line between Rotterdam and Antwerp. They would get a luxurious interior and arrangement to guarantee high speed. The machines were built by Fijenoord. On 22 March 1856 Telegraaph No. 1 was launched. It seems that this was also the first iron vessel by J. & K. Smit.

Even while these two vessels were under construction, the iron steamer Stad Heusden was laid down in early January 1856. She was launched on 31 July 1856. On 12 January 1857 the shipyard launched Prins van Oranje, an iron steam 'yacht' for the shipping line Zaanlandsche Stoomboot Rederij, between Amsterdam and Zaandam.

=== Warships ===
On 3 March 1858 J. & K. Smit got an order for two Vesuvius-class sloops for the Dutch navy. These were first thought to be named Het Loo and Reteh (ex-De Sprinkhaan), but these would be built elsewhere. J. & K. Smit built Cornelis Dirks and Reinier Claeszen. On 11 January 1859 the shipyard in Krimpen aan de Lek launched Cornelis Dirks. On 13 January 1859 Reinier Claeszen, was launched in Kinderdijk.

=== Machine Factory Diepeveen, Lels en Smit, later Machine Factory Kinderdijk ===
On 31 March 1856 the machine factory Diepeveen, Lels en Smit was founded. In fact it was a partnership between B.J. Diepeveen, M.H. Diepeveen, Murk Lels, Leendert Smit Fopzn., and Jan Smit Janzn (our Jan Smit of J. & K. Smit). The first three of these had authority to act for the firm.

On 25 March 1858 J. & K. Smit in Kinderdijk launched a screw steam river vessel with machines made by Diepeveen, Lels en Smit. It was the first ship that was delivered from Kinderdijk including machines. In July 1859 another iron yacht was delivered with machines by the same factory. Diepeveen, Lels en Smit would later be renamed Machine Factory Kinderdijk. It would have a long history, with parts of it still existing today.

This factory, and other companies in the vicinity provided an industrial infrastructure. The shipyards in the area could pay lower wages than e.g. Fijenoord in Rotterdam or Van Vlissingen en Dudok van Heel in Amsterdam, because the cost of living was much lower. Prices for raw materials from the upper Rhine were also good in Kinderdijk. Nevertheless, if J. & K. Smit wanted to compete in the market for steam ships it needed to have the expertise and the parts close at hand. In March 1869 Smit and other industrials in the area would give an example of their understanding, when they asked the municipality to improve expanded primary education, and offered 1,075 guilders a year to do this. The start of the first public powerplant of the Netherlands in 1886 is another example of this infrastructure. (The shipyard itself would be working with electric lighting starting in 1881.)

=== Very strong position in inland navigation ===
In the 1860s the ship yard built a large amount of iron screw ships for inland shipping lines. Each time with machines from Diepeveen, Lels en Smit. In November 1860 the screw steamer Noord-Brabant and a sister ship were launched. These were to replace the 4 sailships of the Rotterdam - 's-Hertogenbosch line. Soon the shipyard was building for shipping lines to Utrecht, Dordrecht, Harlingen, Breda, Schiedam, Oosterhout, Delft, Doesburg, Almelo, Zwolle, Lemmer etc. etc.

A special case were the river ships with two screws, e.g. Pollux of 180 lasts and 45 hp. In the late 1870s the shipyard also built some ships with machines built by others. This development was largely reversed when Diepeveen, Lels en Smit started to build compound engines. In June 1884 Smit launched Victoria, a passenger ship for use on the south coast of England. Which was remarkable, because English shipping lines generally did not order ships abroad. The construction of these kinds of river ships would continue in the 1880s.

In 1862 J. & K. Smit got a permit for a tug service in South Holland, Gelderland, Zeeland and North Brabant. In 1863 the shipyard made an offer to construct Onrust Dock of 3,000 tons, but offered too high.

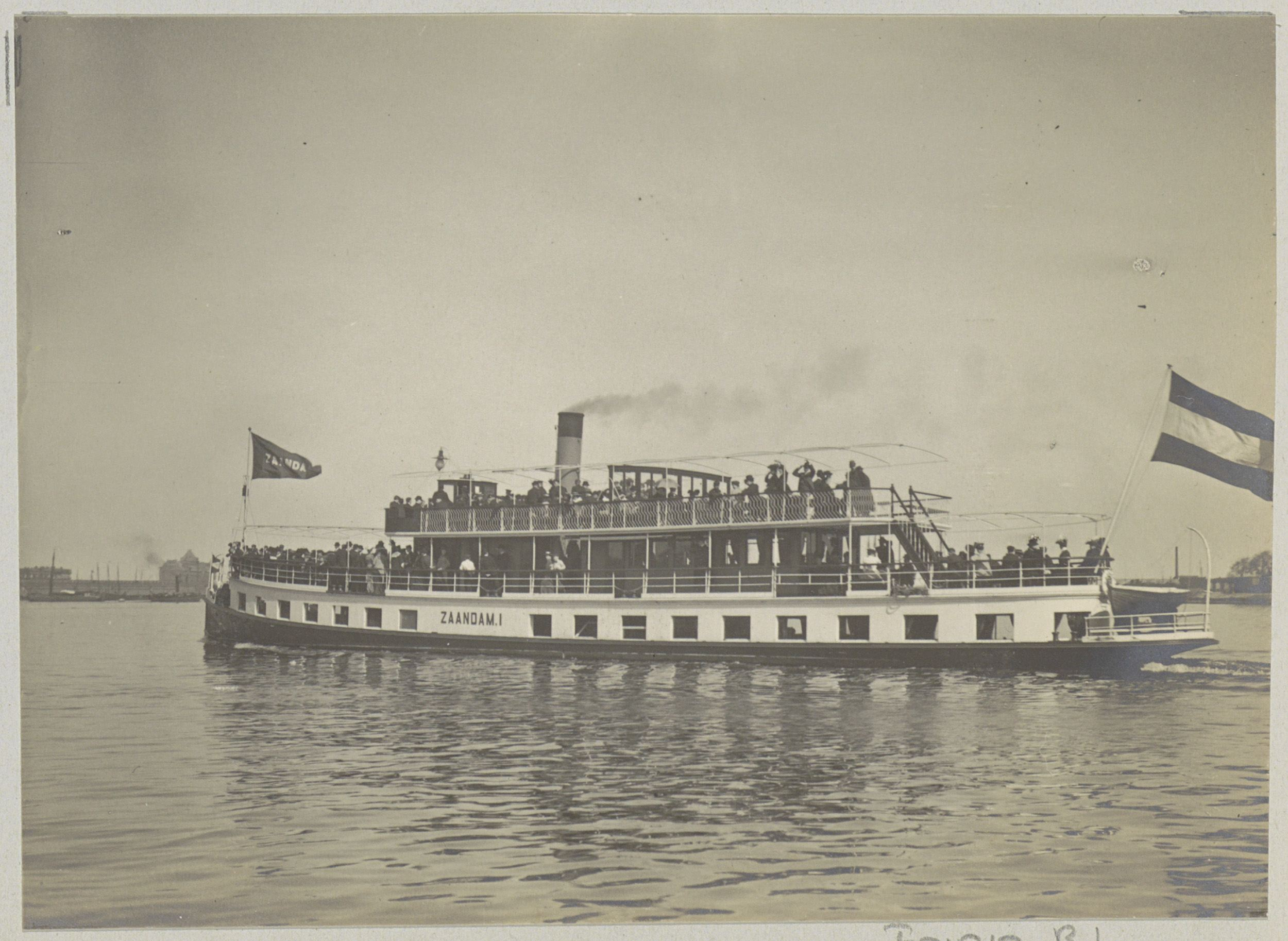
Zaandam I

On 1 January 1887 one new screw steamship was under construction, and three were getting rebuild. On 1 January 1891 J. & K. Smit had 2 paddle steamers and 1 screw boat under construction. The paddle steamer Culemborg of 56 by 6.5 m and 250 ton was launched in August 1891 had an engine by De Schelde. This compound machine of 325 ihp worked with 90 pounds steam pressure, and was installed in Vlissingen. Afterwards Culemborg had to return to the shipyard to be finished. In 1893 J. & K. Smit finished Stad Rotterdam of 40 by 6 m and 160 ihp.

In August 1899 the shipyard launched the steel screw ship Kampen for the Amsterdam Zwolle line. She was 47 by 6.25 by 3.10 m. In October 1899 the shipyard launched a sister ship Zwolle, and laid down two comparable ships, Heerenveen and Bolsward to serve on the Amsterdam Lemmer line. In May 1902 a comparable ship Zaandam I of 43 m, and with 210 ihp machines by Diepeveen, Lels and Smit was launched. She was followed by Zaandam II in June. In 1903 the Fop Smit line from Rotterdam to Gorinchem commissioned President Kruger and President Steyn, two paddle steamers. In September 1903 another river ship Maasnymph was built by the Krimpen shipyard. In October 1903 this shipyard launched Telegraaf VI for the Rotterdam Antwerpen line.

In 1904 J. & K. Smit delivered three 450 ton river steamships Winterswijk, Beverwijk, Harderwijk to the Koninklijke Nederlandse Stoomboot-Maatschappij, which established a daughter company Nieuwe Rijnvaart Maatschappij.

=== Continues to build sailing ships ===
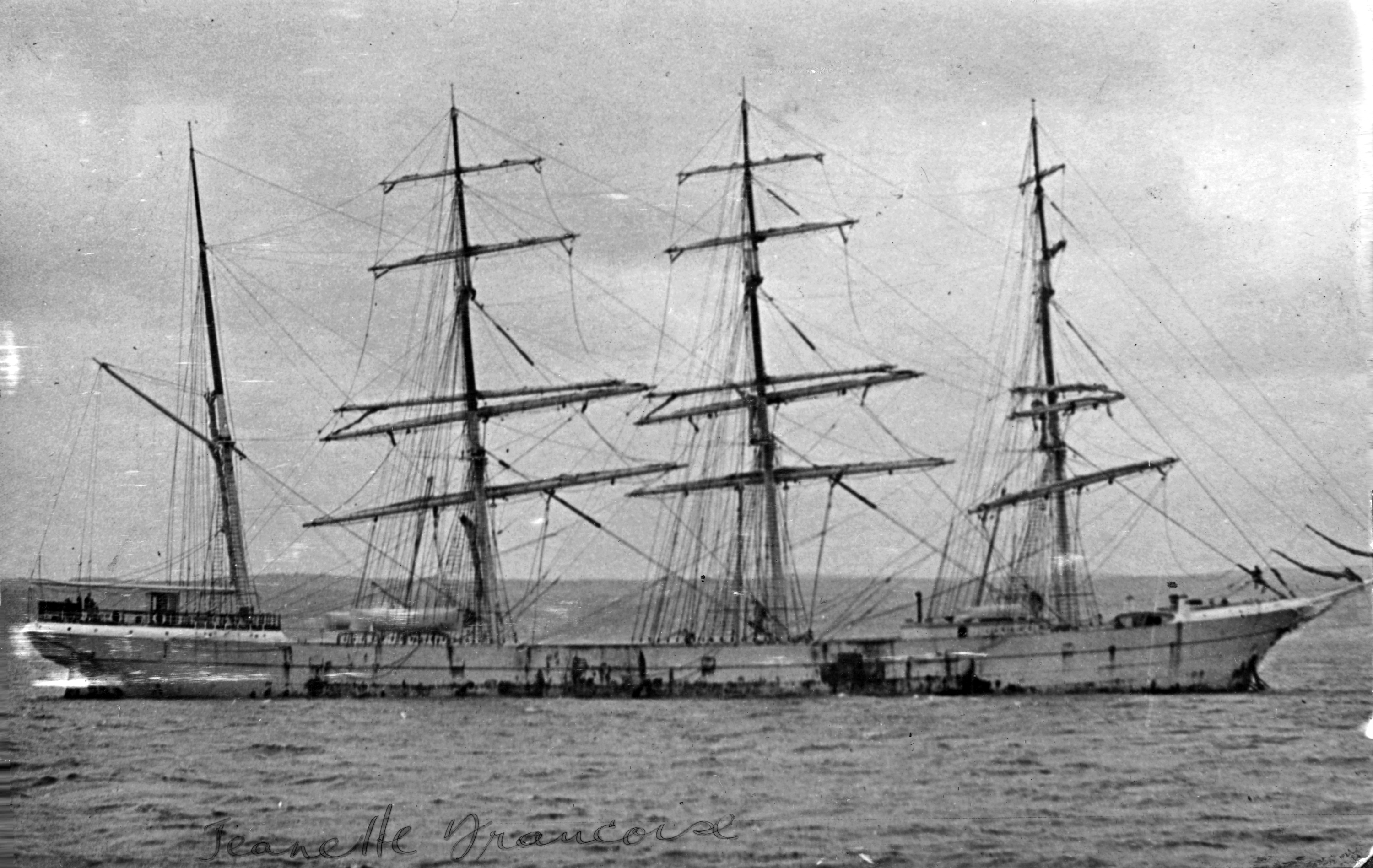
Jeanette Françoise

While the Kinderdijk shipyard seems to have focused on inland screw ships, the shipyard in Kinderdijk continued to construct sailing ships at a moderate pace. In June 1861 the shipyard in Krimpen launched Batavia of 400 lasts for Murk Lels. In 1863 the Krimpen yard launched the frigate Kanagawa of 630 lasts. This was a composite ship. Iron on the inside, wood on the outside. It was launched for Lels and Smit. In March 1870 a new frigate Ottolina was launched. That same year the Krimpen shipyard also launched an iron screw ship for inland navigation.

In September 1884 the iron barque Krimpen aan de Lek was laid down in Krimpen. She was launched on 18 September 1885. On 1 January 1886 and 1 January 1887 the iron barque Anna Aleida (launched November 1886) was under construction. On 8 March 1891 the barque Martina Johanna was launched for P. van der Hoog, and a steel four mast ship of 3,400 ton was laid down. This ship, Jeanette Françoise, was launched on 1 December 1892, and was the biggest sailing ship built in the Netherlands up to that day. In early April 1894 the Kinderdijk shipyard launched the steel three mast schooner Zwijger of 325 ton.

On Saturday 25 August 1894 30-40 men were fired by J. & K. Smit. In the night of 25–26 August 1894 the shipyard in Krimpen aan de Lek then suffered major damage in a fire. 8 steamboats lying next to the machinery building were saved. The machinery building itself and many machines and tools inside burned down. The total damage was about 30,000 guilders, of which 20,000 covered by insurance.

On 19 September 1894 a steel four mast barque of 85 m long and 4,000 ton was laid down in Krimpen aan de Lek. When Jeanette Françoise was launched, she was the biggest Dutch sailing ship. In September 1902 the order for the largest Dutch sailing ship ever came in when there was very little work. During construction it was delayed by a year because many other orders came in. In November 1904 the shipyard launched Geertruida Gerarda. She also spelled the end of big sailing ship construction in the Netherlands. By 1910 there were only two Dutch ocean going sailing ships still in operation.

In June 1895 the Krimpen aan de Lek shipyard got a special assignment when it was to repair Noach V. Ship repair seems to have been a major activity on this shipyard. In May 1902 its patent slip was about to be expanded in order to be able to service bigger ships. In December 1902 the whole Krimpen yard got new electrical lighting.

=== Dredging Equipment ===
In 1878 J. & K. Smit delivered the first Dutch suction dredger Adam I to Volker & Bos for their works in IJmuiden. It proved very suitable, and so Adam II was delivered for the works on the Nieuwe Waterweg in the same year. It was the first self-loading suction dredger, and was a great success. In 1883 the French government ordered three of these ships.

On 1 January 1886 the shipyard seemed to have made a total switch to dredging equipment. On that date it had four dredging vessels on the slipways: An iron pump hopper barge IJmuiden of 400 ton and 40 hp for its own account; a like vessel named Lucy of 450 ton and 40 hp for the South African government; a similar vessel of 400 ton and 50 hp for the Japanese government; the last was an iron dredging vessel Vulcanus for H. Benrick in Utrecht. On 18 February 1886 the steam hopper dredger for Japan was launched. Machinery was by Diepeveen Lels en Smit. After construction, the dredger was disassembled again for transport to Japan. In early 1886 Lucy left East London, South Africa. She was later reported as operating successfully over there. In the whole 1886 the shipyard built 6 dredging vessels, and no others.

On 1 January 1887 the shipyard had two dredging vessels under construction. In 1887 a second dredger Kisogawa, was built for Japan. She had compound steam engines of 276 ihp. On 1 January 1888 J. & K. Smit had only four dredging vessels under construction, and nothing else. Worse, these four vessels were for its own account.

Nevertheless, the move to dredging equipment proved successful, and the vessels became larger. In 1890 the dredging vessel Gordon was built for East London. On 1 January 1891 the shipyard had the 600 ton pump hopper barge Boulogne III under construction for the French government. On 1 January 1894 the shipyard had only a bucket dredger under construction. In 1894 the shipyard got an order by the River Wear commissioners in Sunderland for a new suction excavator (Zandzuiger). This was still a rare occurrence, but the details of the bid make it clear why a foreign company got the order. J. & K. Smit offered the 600 ton vessel for 11,000 GBP. The English offers were for 12,270 GBP for the ship and boiler alone, for an estimated total of 14,270 GBP. In 1897 Smit built a suction dredger and a bucket dredger. On 1 January 1898 it two suction dredgers under construction: 1 for the Danish and one for the Russian government. In 1899 the shipyard built three dredgers, one for Argentina, one for Australia, and one for Denmark. In 1906 the shipyard launched four elevator hopper barges for Chile; a bucket dredger M.O.P. 18 C for Argentina, a bucket dredger barge, and a suction dredger.

=== Sea-going ships ===
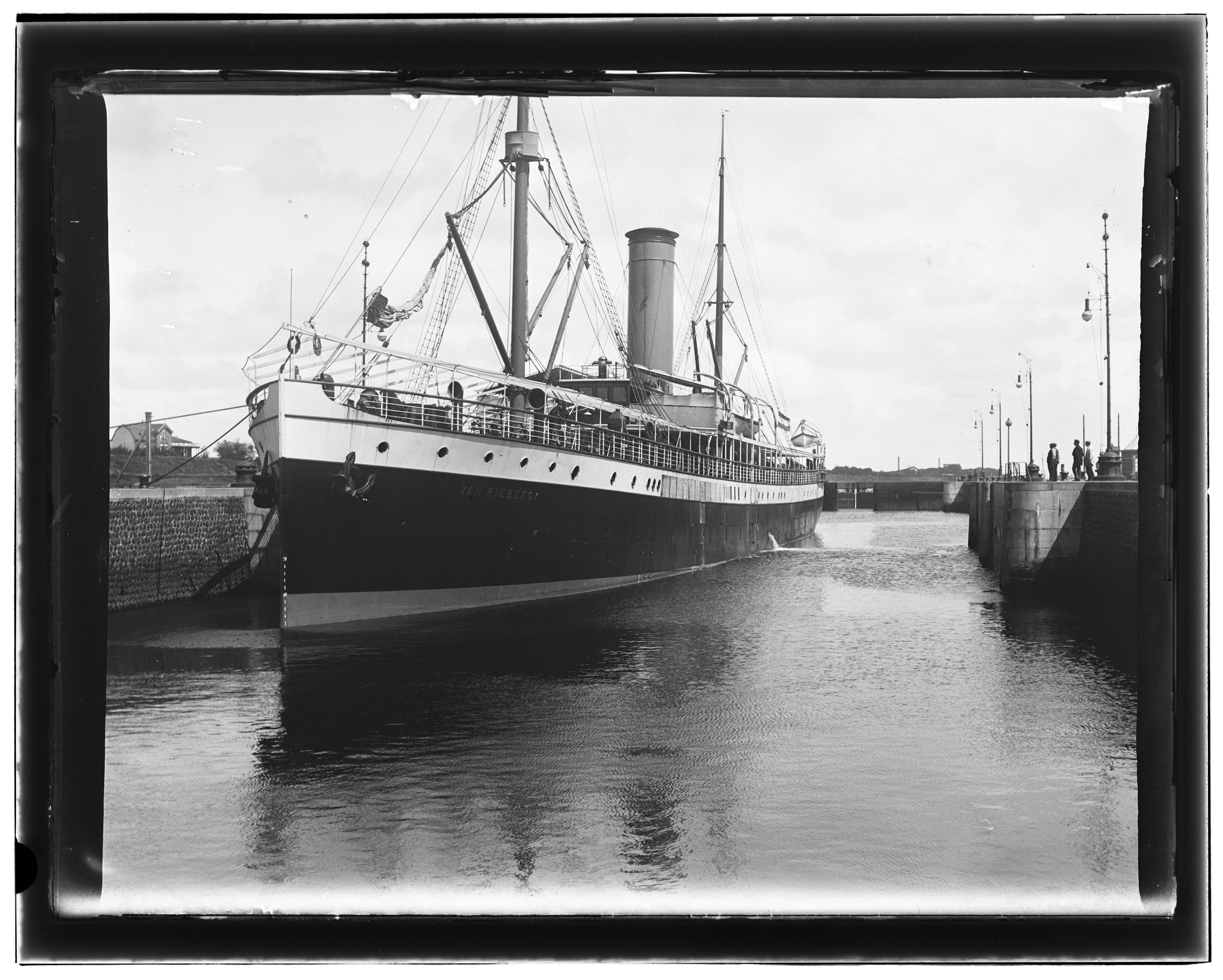
SS Van Riebeeck in 1902

In May 1889 J. & K. Smit got an order from the Koninklijke Paketvaart-Maatschappij for a steamer for its lines in the Dutch East Indies. This was quite prestigious, because it was something quite different from ships for inland navigation. However, the order for Smit was for one of for four smaller vessels. Even so, the 600 ihp machines for Van Riebeeck were built by Fijenoord. On 31 May 1890 Van Riebeeck was launched. Nevertheless, the shipyard did not launch many ships for the high seas. In December 1903 it launched Automaat, a coal ship of 225 feet long, with engines by Nederlandsche Fabriek van Werktuigen en Spoorwegmaterieel.

=== Tugboats ===
Tugboats would become another specialty of J. & K. Smit. Fop Smit had founded a tug service, which would later become Smit International after a merger in 1923. After the death of Fop, his shipyard was continued by a partnership between his son Leendert Smit and his grandson Jan Smit V, known as Firma (partnership) L. Smit en Zoon. The tug service of Fop Smit was taken over by a partnership of J. Smit Jzn, Murk Lels, and two of Fop Smit's sons. The permit that Fop Smit's tug service held was transferred to L. Smit & Co. in December 1866. Murk Lels was manager of L. Smit & Co. In short J. Smit became one of the owners of the big tug service founded by Fop Smit.

In 1895 J. & K. Smit launched the screw tugboats Wachter of 130 ihp L. Smit & Co, and Amsterdam of 180 ihp for another company. In 1897 Smit built 1 tugboat. on 1 January 1898 it had one 1,200 ihp tugboat under construction for L. Smit.

In 1906 the shipyard completed three sea tugboats for L. Smit & Co. Rozenburg had 350 ihp and 146 ton. Kijkduin was only 63 ton. Zwarte Zee, launched on 9 July 1906 was something different at 533 ton. She was one of the largest European tugboats.

=== Expansion ===
In October 1898 J. & K. Smit tendered the construction north of their shipyard, of a harbor, quays and shoring. The order was won for 27,590 guilders, showing the size of the works.

== History of J. & K. Smit N.V. 1907 - 1965 ==
=== J. & K. Smit Inc. (1907-1914) ===
On 5 February 1907 J. & K. Smit was incorporated as a naamloze vennootschap or limited company. The board consisted of two directors: H. Smit and K.G. Smit, the supervisory board was formed by the founders J. Smit Jzn. and K. Smit Jzn. now both octogenarians. Capital was 500.000 guilders in 100 shares.

The overview of ships built in 1906 gives an idea of the position of J. & K. Smit at the time. It was a specialist on multiple markets. On the local market for inland shipping it was strong in passenger ships, but passenger ships faced ever stronger competition from the train. As regards inland cargo shipping it was not a major player. On the market for tugboats it was a major player, supported by the family tugboat services, but also capable of getting orders from abroad. In the market for dredging equipment it was a world class manufacturer, but it faced strong competition from e.g. Conrad Shipyard in Haarlem. It was not one of the few Dutch shipyards that competed on the market for ocean going ships.

In 1908 an inland 'passenger and cargo' ship was launched for H. Janssen in Lith. In March 1909 the steamship Zeeland for the ferry between Vlissingen and Breskens was launched. In 1911 the passenger ships Noord-Beveland and Schouwen were launched for Zeeland.

On 20 June 1907 the hopper suction dredger Chile was launched. In July 1907 the bucket dredger Nederland III was launched for I. van der Velde P.Azn. in Dordrecht. In 1908 the shipyard delivered a seashell suction 'dredger', which harvested shells. In February 1909 the hopper bucket dredger M.O.P.C. 21 was launched for Argentina. In August 1909 the hopper bucket dredger La Loire made her trials ner Krimpen aan de Lek. Her hull had been made in England, but the machinery was made in Kinderdijk. Several other vessels were built for Argentina and Chile. In 1912 the steam hoppers Kinderdijk and Krimpen of 400 m^{3} capacity each, would be used to transport stone for the works on the Suez Canal.

In September 1907, an ocean tugboat with engines by Machine Factory Kinderdijk was launched for L. Smit & Co. In June 1908 the ocean tugboat Roode Zee was launched for the same. She measured 171 by 30 by 18 feet and had 1,500 ihp triple expansion machines by Machine Factory Kinderdijk. She was the biggest tugboat of the world. Her first assignment would be to tow an 8,000 tons dry dock from Wallsend northern England to Callao Peru, together with Zwarte Zee. In 1909 two small tugboats were built for built for Rotterdam and Chile. In July 1914 a slightly smaller tugboat Witte Zee made her trials.

In 1911 the obituary of Jan Smit mentioned his achievements. The strength of his shipyard was in the construction of: material for contractors, river and coastal cargo ships, and tugboats. In passenger ships, it had started with paddle steamers. When screw ship were introduced, Jan had developed the so-called 16 hp screw cargoship. Noord Braband was the first of these, followed by hundreds of others. Jan also designed the first screw tugboat used in Rotterdam. He had played a major role in establishing the worldwide Dutch reputation for dredging equipment.

=== World War I ===
The first years of World War I were kind of business as usual for J. & K. Smit. It built two screw passenger ships for a Zuiderzee line, and some dredging equipment. One of the latter was Sumatra, a suction dredge of 85 m long and 2,450 ton, for the Dutch East Indies. However, the hull was built by shipyard Rijkee. Nevertheless, it was obvious that the international market for dredging equipment would slow down. The same applied to river transport between Rotterdam and Germany. On the contrary, the demand for new ships was huge. On 31 December 1915 J. & K. Smit had four sea-going cargo ships under construction. In September 1917 Ganymedes was launched in Krimpen aan de Lek as the biggest steamship built in Kinderdijk till that date. It was 340 feet long, had a cargo capacity of 4,400 ton / 2,747 BRT and engines by Werkspoor. Immediately after, a motorship of 6,500 ton was laid down Sister ship Ceres was launched in February 1918. On 31 December 1918 the shipyard had only four motorships of 1,600-4,000 brt under construction for Norway, and one steamship of 4,500 BRT for a local customer. At the end of World War I, J. & K. Smit seemed a very regular shipyard, building sea-going ships.

=== Interwar period ===
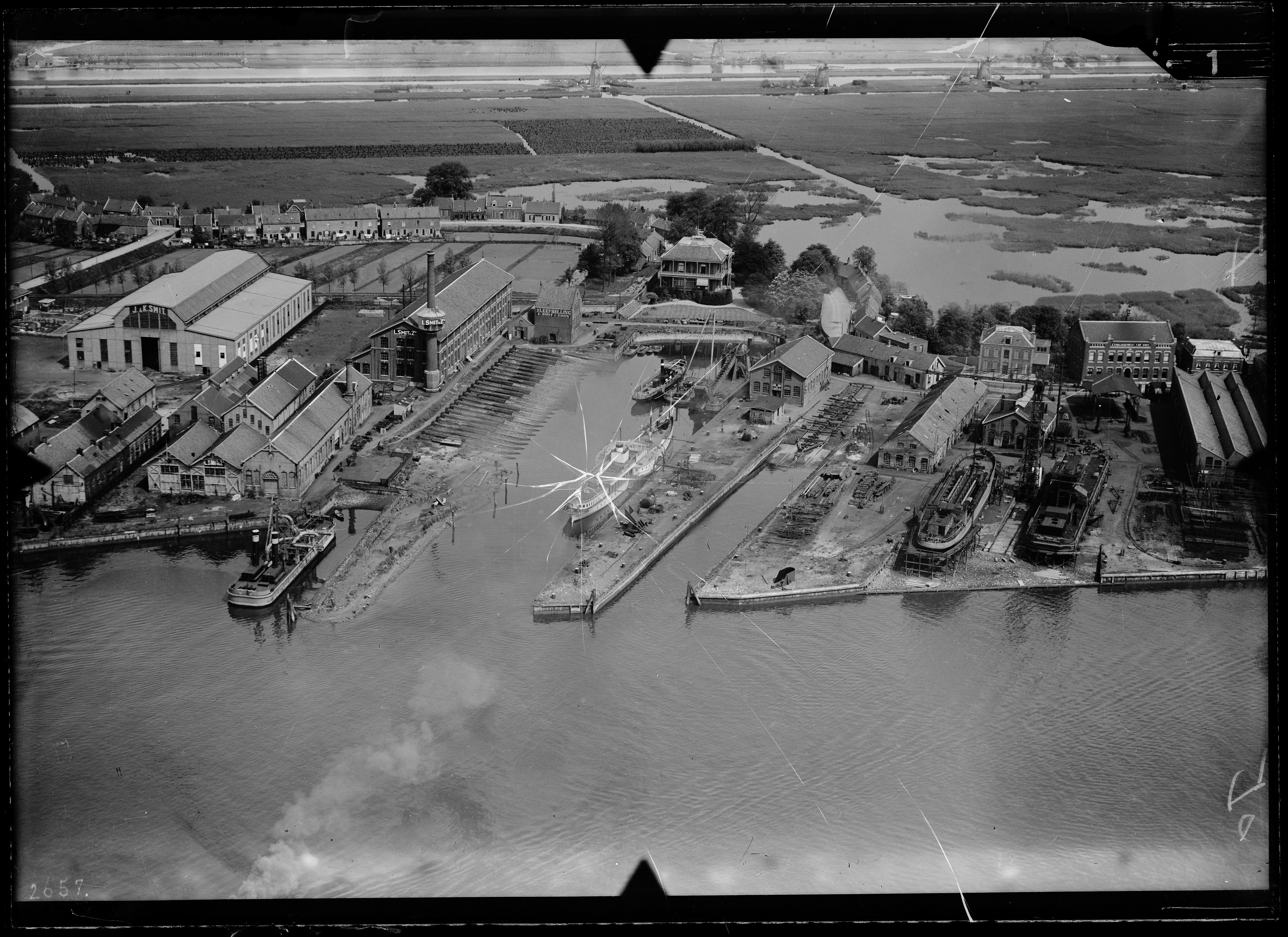
L. Smit en Zoon (right) and part of J. & K. north, or left of it interwar

After the war there was a boom in shipbuilding. J. & K. Smit participated, and built a number of motorships for Norway, but these were not all launched from its own shipyard. In 1921 a crisis started in the industry, and wages were cut. That year Smit was still building motorships, but was also back to constructing four sea-going tugs, capable of firing oil and coal. In June 1922 the shipyard launched SS Bontekoe of 117 m for KPM. Also in 1922 the Suction Hopper Celebes was delivered. She was a sister ship of Sumatra, with the hull built by Boele in Bolnes, engines by Fijenoord, and the suction dredging equipment by Smit.

The January 1923 Occupation of the Ruhr was very damaging to the Dutch shipbuilding industry, especially in South Holland. In March 1923 there was a remark that J. & K. Smit was exceptional by still working full hours with 700 men. All the other shipyards were doing short time in order not to have to lay off too many people. In June 1923 both shipyard still launched a dredging vessel, but in mid June 125 laborers were fired. In the next years the shipyard survived by building some small ships, dredging equipment, and Diesel engines.

In 1926 the shipyard built a tin bucket dredger for the government mines on Bangka Island. In 1927 it was followed by the Sergang and Soerabaya for Singkep Tin Company on Bangka. Another tin dredger, Weltevreden was built for the Tinbagger Maatschappij (Tin dreding company) in The Hague in 1928, and was also sent to Bangka. In 1928 J. & K. Smit delivered the machinery for a cutter suction dredger to Australia, including 4 Smit-M.A.N. Diesel engines. The shipyard also built engines and boilers for a Dutch navy mine sweeper which was built for the East Indies Navy in Willemsoord. In 1929 the shipyard launched 8 dredging vessels.

By mid 1930, the Great Depression took its toll, and Smit was laying off people. The shipyard still got some dredging equipment orders that year. Nevertheless, in mid 1931 160 men were laid off. in January 1932 a suction dredger was launched for an American customer. In April the remaining laborers would work only one of every three weeks. In June 1932 all remaining laborers were laid off, and the shipyard was closed.

On 9 November 1933 J. & K. Smit got an order for a big hopper suction dredger with Smit-Mann diesel engines. By March 1934 the shipyard had become operational again with 50 men. In 1934 a Belgian order for a motorship a bucket dredger came in. Thus J. & K. Smit shipyard, L. Smit en Zoon shipyard and the machine factory still employed only slightly more than 200 men in December 1935. In the second half of the 1930s business improved with orders for Argentina, more dredgers, diesel engines and parts of the new motorway bridges. The launching of the big tin dredger Doejoeng was a highlight of the sharp recovery of the dredging market. More tin dredgers followed, also one for British India. In 1939 the shipyard got an order for 6 submarine hunters of 65 by 6.8 by 2 m, with 40 mm guns, a displacement of 395 ton, and speed of 24 knots.

=== World War II ===
During World War II J. & K. Smit intensified its cooperation with other companies. In January 1942 it was involved in founding the Coöperatieve Vereniging Mineraal Technologisch Instituut, together with Gusto Shipyard prev. A.F. Smulders from Schiedam, L. Smit shipyard, Verschure & Co., Conrad Shipyard, Stork Hijs N.V. and Machine Factory De Klop. This cooperation would intensify after the war. A peculiar kind of work during the war, was the conversion of motor trawlers to steam trawlers.

=== Industriële Handels Combinatie IHC, post-war ===
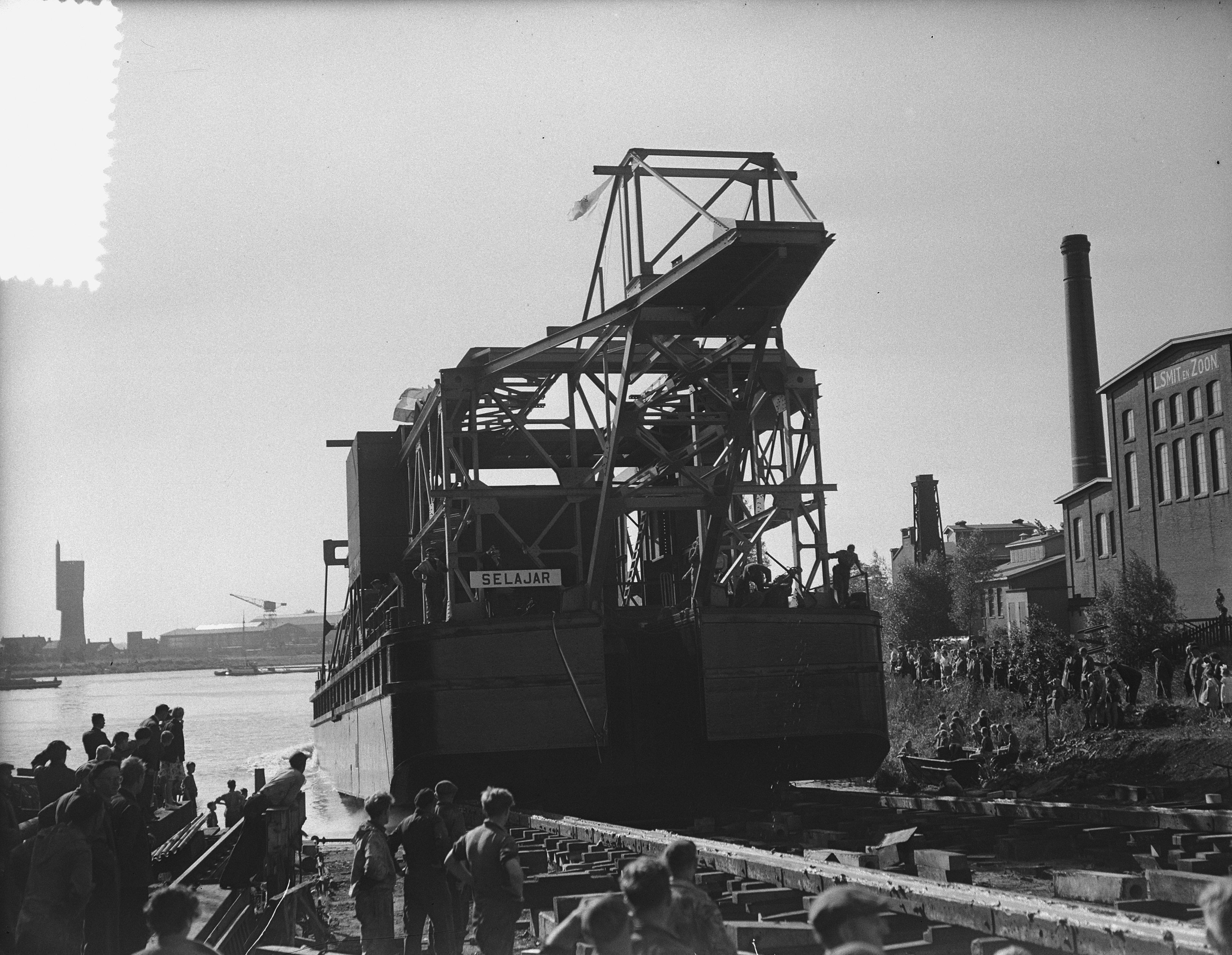
Launch of tin suction cutter Selajar in August 1954

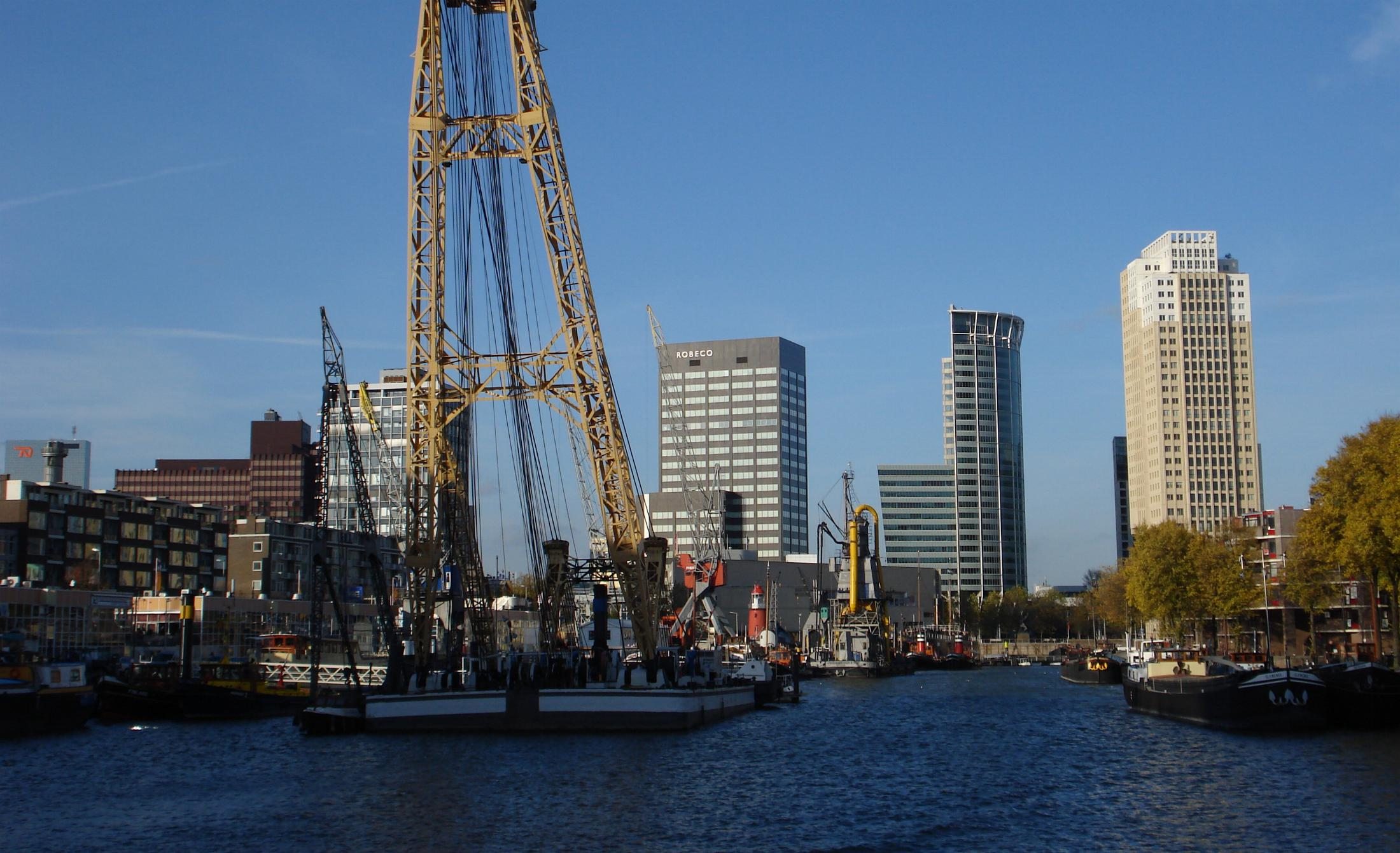
Floating sheerleg Simson in Rotterdam

The Industriële Handels Combinatie IHC in the Hague was a partnership. The idea came up when the Billiton company made plans for tin mining after the war, and a number of shipyards each deemed themselves incapable to build the required vessels on their own after the war. The partnership consisted of Conrad Shipyard in Haarlem, Gusto Shipyard in Schiedam, Machine Factory De Klop in Sliedrecht, J. & K. Smit in Kinderdijk, L. Smit en Zoon in Kinderdijk, and Verschure & Co's in Amsterdam. These were all strong players in dredging, but wanted to be more efficient. In sales e.g. it was very inefficient for all these relatively small companies to have their own agents abroad. Already in July 1945, an order for 6 tin bucket dredgers came in from the Billiton Company. The order would be built by a consortium of Gusto, Conrad, Stork Hijs and Verschure & Co. under leadership of J. & K. Smit. In December 1946 IHC contracted with Turkey for 6 twin screw passenger ships. In September 1947 IHC got a French order for five big dredgers.

In the 1950s IHC contracted for many dredging vessels. In 1952 it also contracted for 5 reefer ships. In this order, Verschure & Co. and De Klop each built two ships, and J. & K. Smit only one. The engines would be built by Werkspoor and De Schelde. As an independent shipyard J. & K. Smit contracted for multiple tugboats, and for minesweepers. In 1956 IHC got an order for a cutting suction dredger to dig for bauxite in Suriname. The floating sheerleg Simson is now in the Maritime Museum Rotterdam it was built by a combination of shipyards. De Hoop in Hardinxveld would build the pontoon. Kloos en Zn. N.V. built the superstructure, and J. & K. Smit made the steam engines, tools and other machinery.

In December 1955 the shipyard got an order from Zeeland for a 102 m long roll-on/roll-off ferry for the line between Vlissingen and Breskens. In November 1957 the shipyard launched Prinses Beatrix. An aerial photograph shows her at the shipyard. Prinses Beatrix was a troublesome ship from the start, and was involved in a collision during her trials. In December 1958 Prinses Beatrix hit the jetty in Vlissingen at almost full speed. The cause was a defect that kept the propellers on the 'bow' side from functioning. Already before this incident Zeeland decided to tender the construction of a sister ship. The order then went to De Schelde shipyard in Vlissingen.

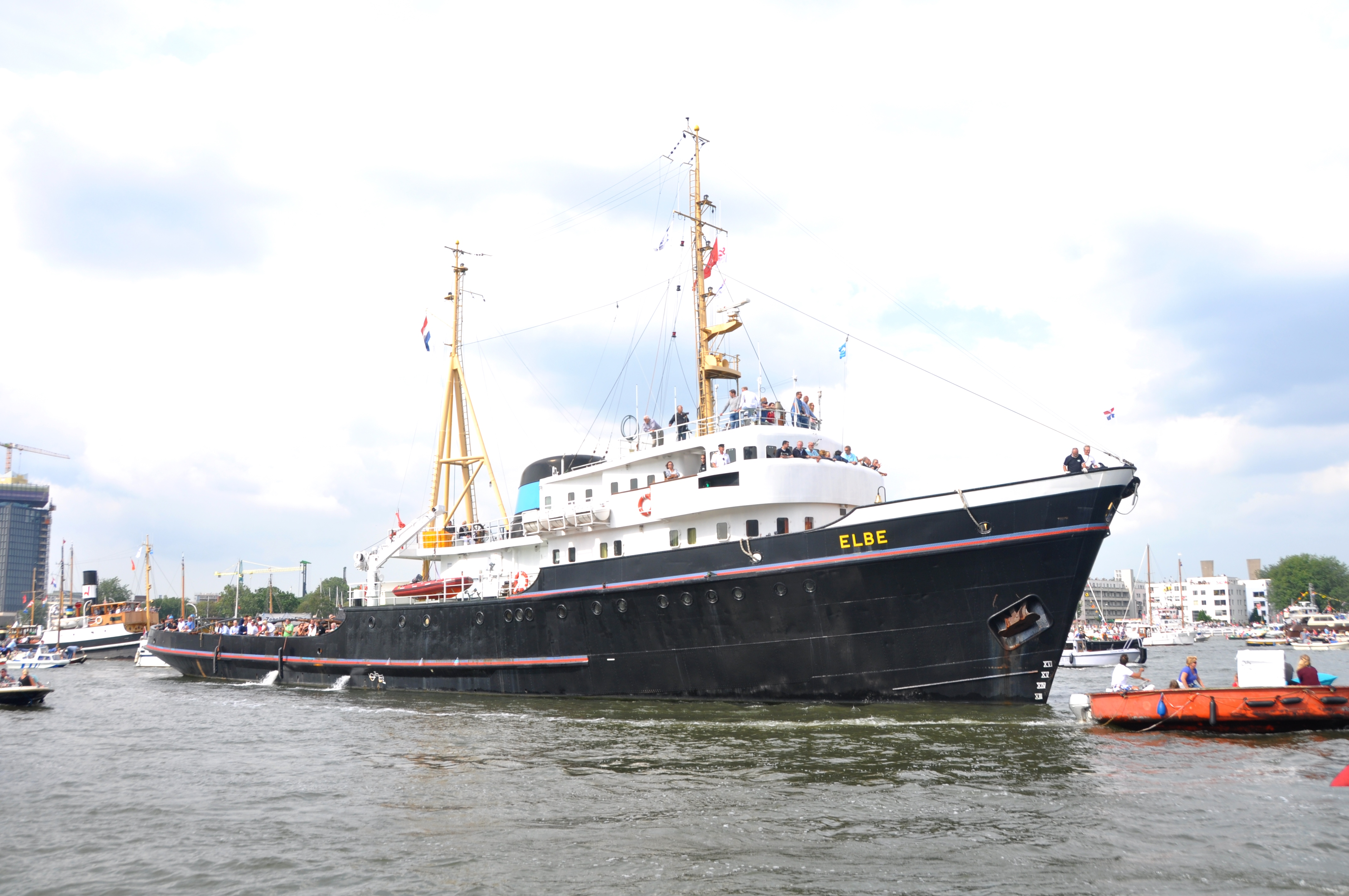
Sea tug Elbe built by J&K Smit in 1959

In January 1957 J. & K. Smit delivered the seagoing tug Clyde for L. Smit & Co. On 14 October 1958 J. & K. Smit launched Elbe, a sister ship. It was the thirtieth tugboat launched by the shipyard. Elbe was later known as MV Greenpeace, serving Greenpeace in its campaigns to preserve the seas. The sturdynes of the ship came in handy during the violent reactions against these campaigns. Later she was rechristened Elbe, and is now a museum ship in Maassluis.

In 1957 and 1958 the business of J. & K. Smit was still going very well, even though the shipbuilding industry at large was in trouble. 1959 was an even slightly better year, as was 1961. In 1962 profits dropped by 40%. The shipyard still had lots of work, but costs (especially labor) increased dramatically, and competition lowered prices. In 1963 the situation was almost the same. In 1964 profits dropped somewhat further.

Meanwhile, the shipyard continued to produce the usual dredging equipment and tugboats. A special dredger was a rock breaker / spoon dredger built for the Suez Canal in 1960. It could fix itself by using studs. It would then use a 22,500 kg digging bar to break rock formations. The 4.5 m^{3} spoon would then pick up the fragments. In 1961 the sea tug Thames was delivered. On 12 October 1962 the fourth sea tug named Zwarte Zee was launched. She was the biggest, fastest, and most powerful tug of the world. In 1963 the tugs Hudson and Orinoco were launched.

== Merger into IHC Holland ==
In 1965 the boards of 5 of the 6 companies which cooperated in IHC Holland decided to merge their companies. Conrad Shipyard en Stork Hijsch N.V. could not join, because it was part of the Stork conglomerate. In 1966 IHC Holland started to merge J. &. K. Smit and L. Smit en Zoon shipyards into a partnership known as Smit Kinderdijk v.o.f. In 1978 IHC Holland was split in three parts, with the holding getting renamed to Caland Holdings in 1979. The offshore part became known as IHC Inter. In 1984 these merged again into IHC Caland.

Several old buildings of J. & K. Smit shipyard are now part of the modern shipyard. E.g. the large buildings on the interwar aerial photograph marked with 'J. & K. Smit' and 'L. Smit & Zn'. These are now (2021) completely hemmed in by more modern buildings. The slipways and most of the harbors are now covered with halls in order to work more comfortable and effectively.
