= Geertruida Gerarda (1904 ship) =

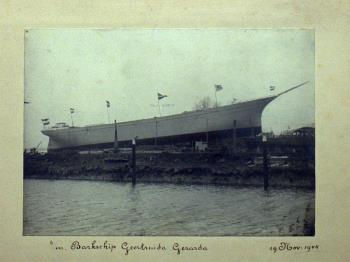
- The Geertruida Gerarda at the yard on her launch date

History

Netherlands
- Name: Geertruida Gerarda
- Owner: 1905-1906 Rederij Pieter van der Hoog; 1907-1910 Rederij Cornelis Lels; 1910-1920 Rhederei AG of 1896, Hamburg; 1920-1924 Government of Italy; 1924-1926 S.A. Prodotti Metallici, Genoa
- Builder: J. & K. Smit, Krimpen aan de Lek
- Yard number: 544
- Laid down: 27 September 1902
- Launched: 19 November 1904
- Maiden voyage: 20 April 1905
- Identification: NSQV
- Fate: Scrapped

General characteristics
- Type: Barque
- Tonnage: 2505
- Length: 88.27 m
- Beam: 13.55 m
- Depth: 6.2 m
- Decks: 2
- Propulsion: Sail
- Crew: 29

The Geertruida Gerarda (2) was a steel four-mast barque launched in the Netherlands in 1904. Measuring 2505 tons, she was the largest sailing vessel ever built in that country and also the last tall ship built by a Dutch yard for commercial purposes.

== History ==
The Geertruida Gerarda was built between 1902 and 1904 at the J. & K. Smit yard in Krimpen aan de Lek, just east of Rotterdam. The yard, raised in 1847, had some experience building large sailing vessels. The ship was named after an 1890 three-mast barque under the same name, that was abandoned and sank west of Australia in 1902. First owner of the Geertruida Gerarda (2) was Pieter van der Hoog, a former skipper and an entrepreneur who had been in shipping since 1877. The ship made her maiden voyage from Rotterdam to Batavia carrying a load of break bulk cargo, departing 20 April 1905.

In 1906 Van der Hoog died and the ship came under the management of Cornelis Lels, a ship owner in Rotterdam. He sold the vessel in 1910 to the Hamburg, Germany based Rhederei AG von 1896, that renamed her Olympia. At the onset of World War I the ship was in Iquique, Chile and she was interned. After the war the owner was forced to hand her over to the Italian government as war reparation. The Italians never did much with the ship and she was demolished in Genoa in 1926.

== Sources ==
- (in Dutch) Krimpen aan de Lek, thuishaven van reders en zeevarenden, website maintained by the Krimpen aan de Lek historical society, retrieved 10 February 2016.
