= Oene Sierksma =

Dutch politician

Oene Sierksma (born 1951? in Kampen, Overijssel) is a Dutch politician of the Reformatory Political Federation (RPF) and its successor the ChristianUnion (CU).

Sierksma was mayor of Nieuw-Lekkerland from 2002 to 2007.
