= Lekkerkerk =

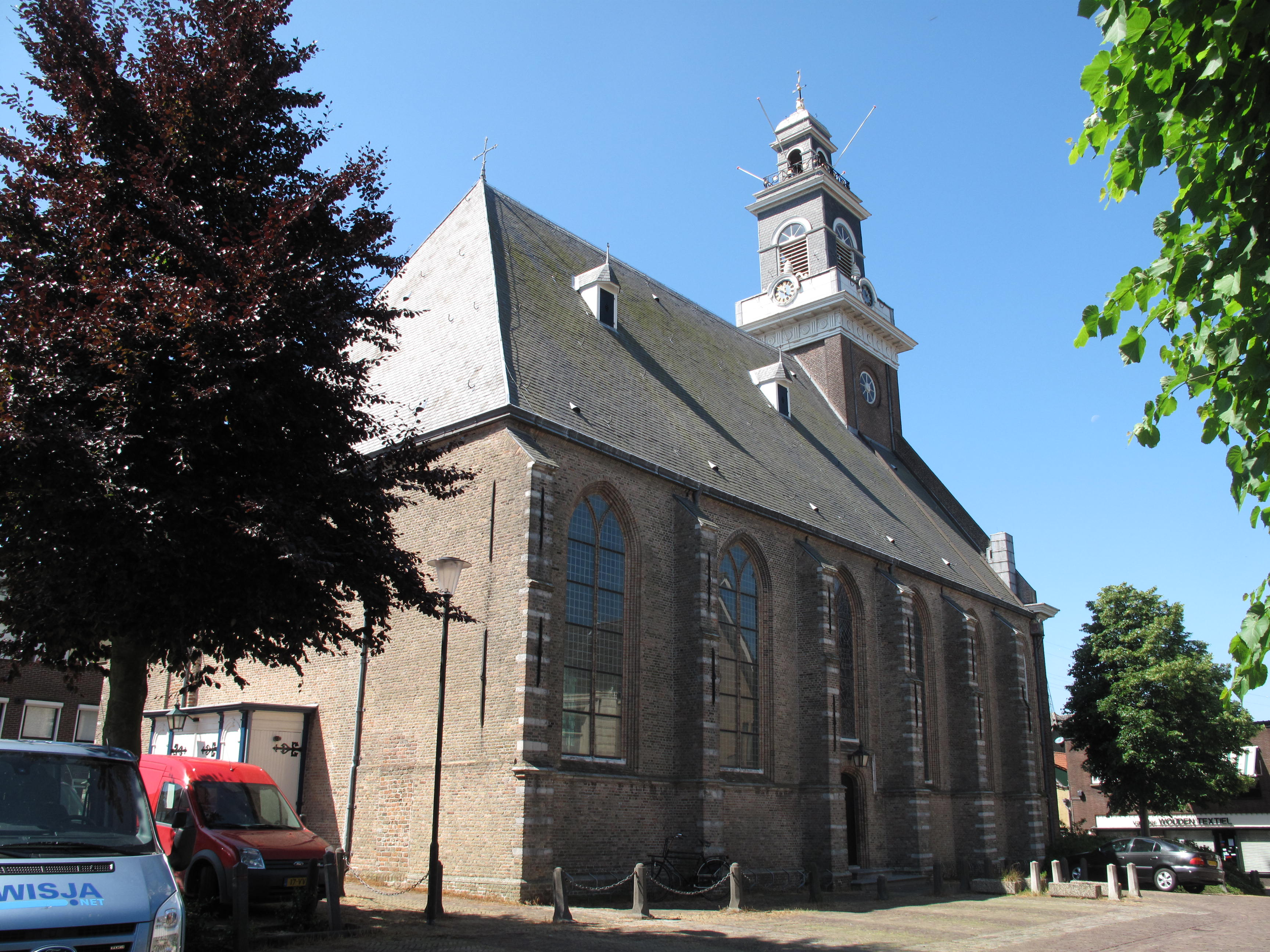
- The main Lekkerkerk church Johanneskerk

- Coat of arms
- Interactive map of Lekkerkerk
- Coordinates: 51°53′50″N 4°40′58″E
- Country: Netherlands
- Province: South Holland
- Municipality: Krimpenerwaard

Population (2007)
  - City: 8,000
  - Urban: 4,080

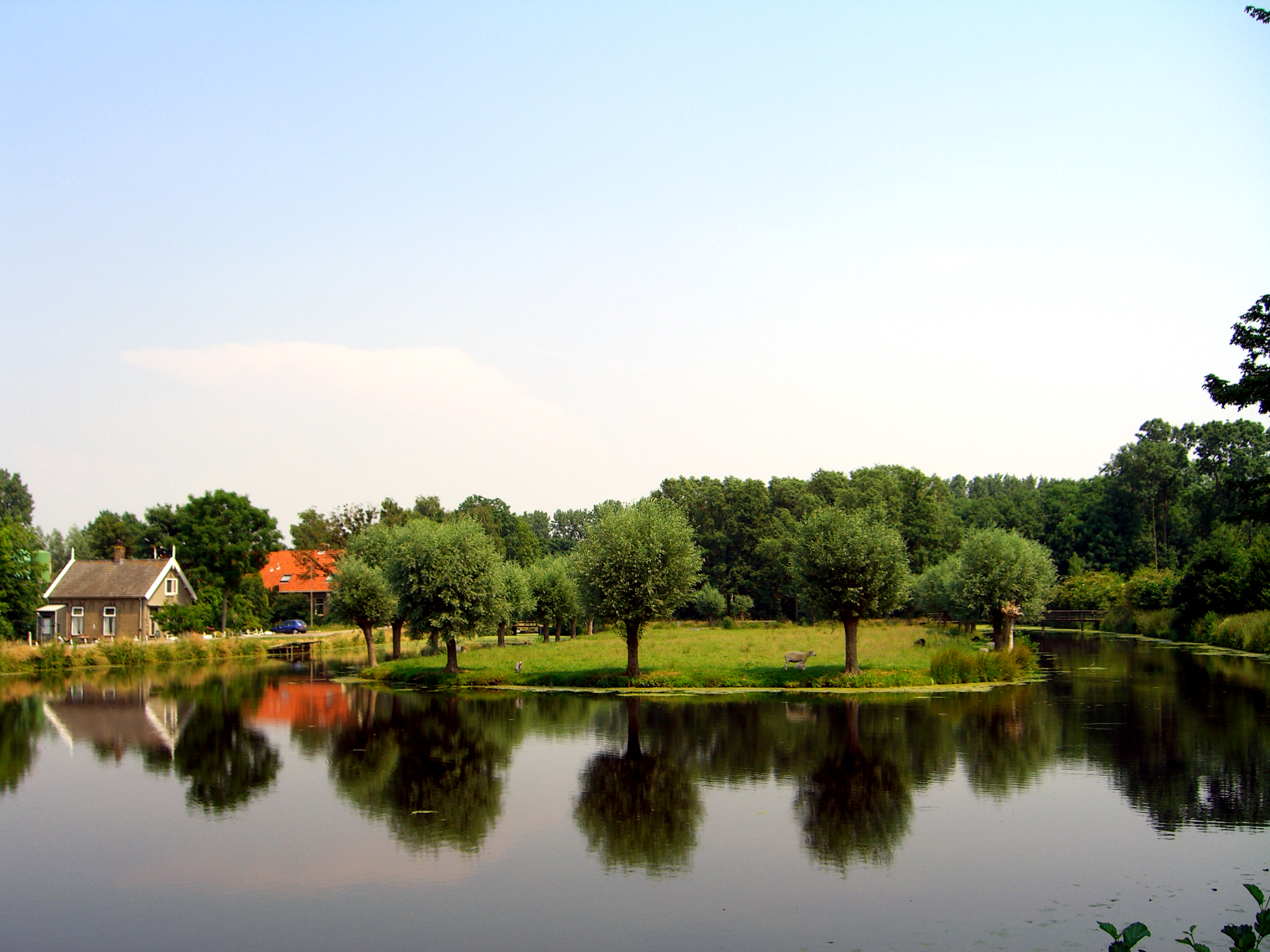
Loet Forest north of Lekkerkerk.

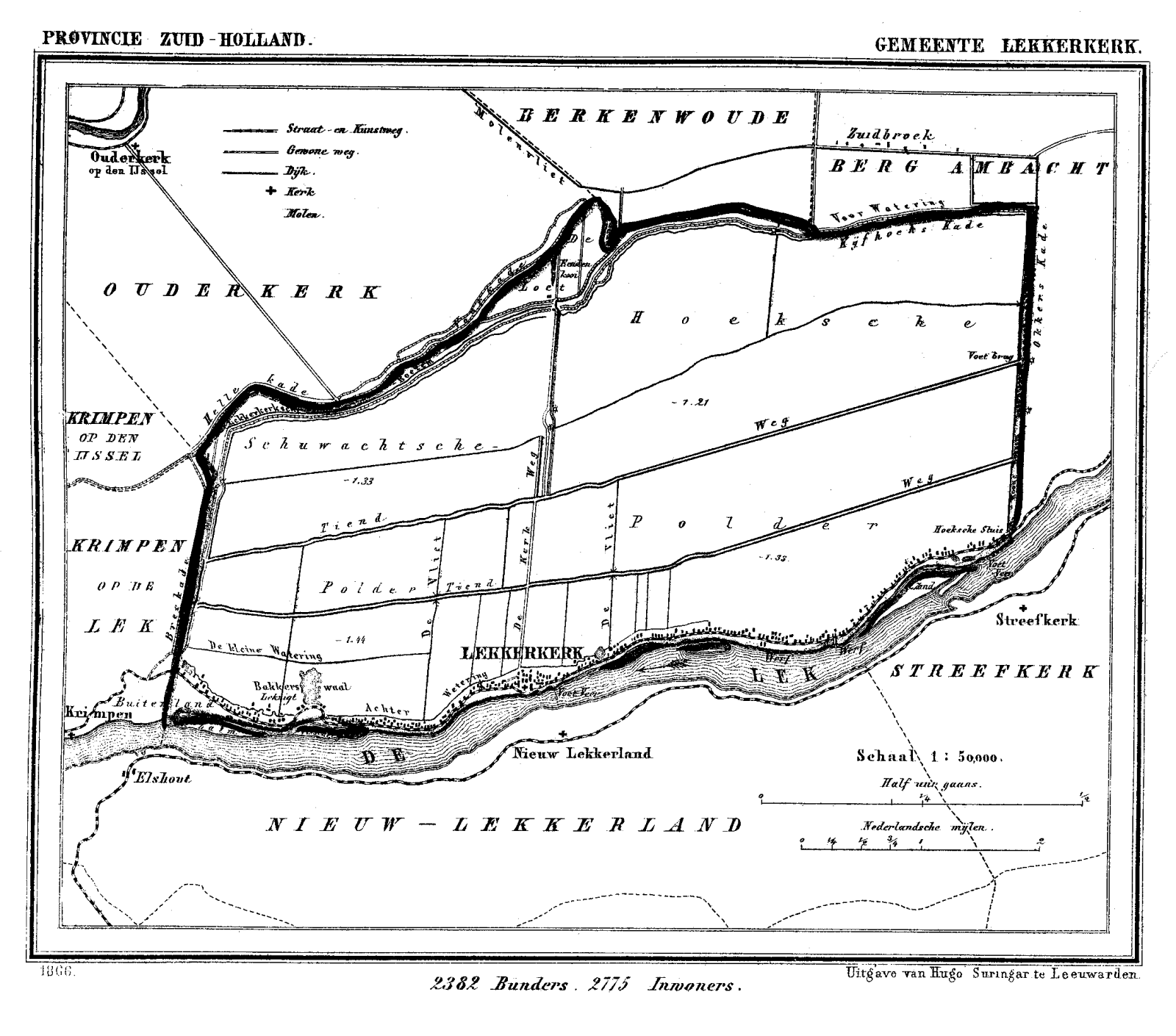
Lekkerkerk in 1866.

Lekkerkerk is a town and former municipality on the Lek River, now part of the municipality of Krimpenerwaard, South Holland province, the Netherlands. Since 1 January 1985 Lekkerkerk is no longer an independent municipality.

Lekkerkerk is mostly an agricultural community with its housing, including attractive 17th, 18th, and 19th century farms, stretched out on the dike along the Lek River. Near the Reformed Church (Johanneskerk), the development is denser and forms the town centre.

== History ==
The oldest evidence of habitation in the Krimpenerwaard is no older than the 10th century. It is assumed that systematic cultivation only began in the 11th and early 12th century, with the river levees functioning as the base.

Initially the name of the village and its surroundings was "Leckelant". The name "Leckerkercke" was used for the first time in 1276 when a village centre formed around the new church and across the Lek River Nieuw Leckelant began to develop. In 1342 Lekkerkerk was a county with the subordinate fiefdoms of Krimpen (Krimpen aan de Lek and Krimpen aan den IJssel), Stormpolder, Ouderkerk aan den IJssel and Zuidbroek.

The first real significant growth of the village started in 1900 when several alleys were built perpendicular to the river dike. After 1950 the growth accelerated. Especially after the inauguration of the Algera Bridge at Krimpen aan den IJssel, the Krimpenerwaard became a popular location for commuters to Rotterdam.

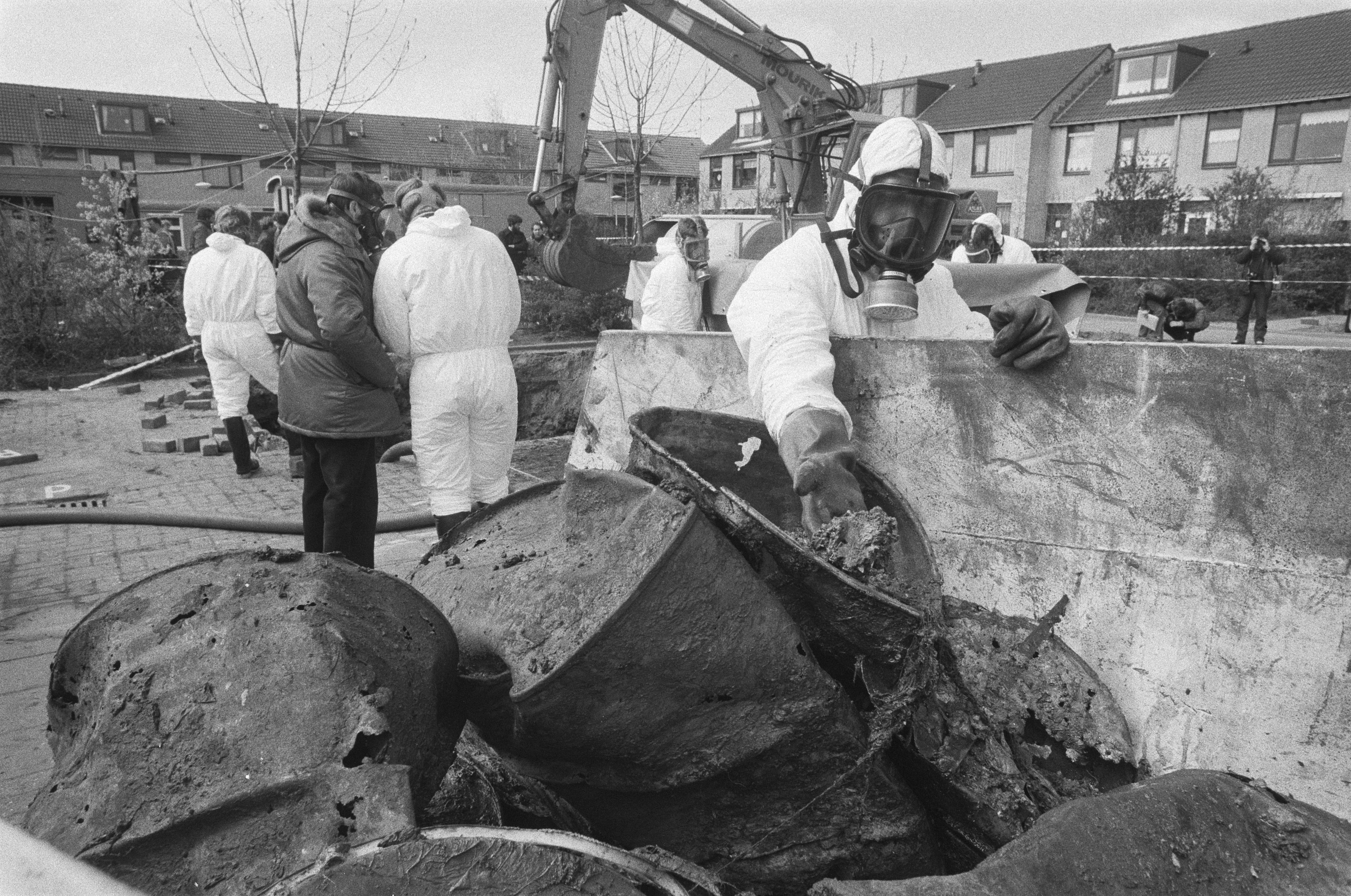
Crews at work

In 1980 and 1981 Lekkerkerk gained national notoriety when it was found that the soil underneath the new neighbourhood west of the Kerkweg (Church Road) was very polluted. The cost for removal and clean-up was 188 million Dutch guilders (85 million euros).

On 1 January 1985, the municipalities of Lekkerkerk and Krimpen aan de Lek merged to form the new municipality of Nederlek.

== Economy ==
For centuries the economy of Lekkerkerk has been agriculture, fishing, shipping, and ship building.

Like so many other peat areas in Holland and Utrecht, agriculture in the Krimpenerwaard was characterized by crop cultivation in the higher lands and the lower areas used for cattle grazing. The primary crop was grain, but hops and cabbage were also cultivated with some orchards and even vineyards present as well.

As a result of the important fishing industries along the river, wood and ship building industries developed, as well as ropemaking. Ropemakers used to use hemp for ropes. So hemp has been cultivated on a large scale in the Krimpenerwaard since around 1600. Circa 1930, the Opperduit area still consisted almost exclusively of hemp growers but today the whole Krimpenerwaard is used for cattle grazing.
