= Aart den Boer =

Dutch architect and contractor

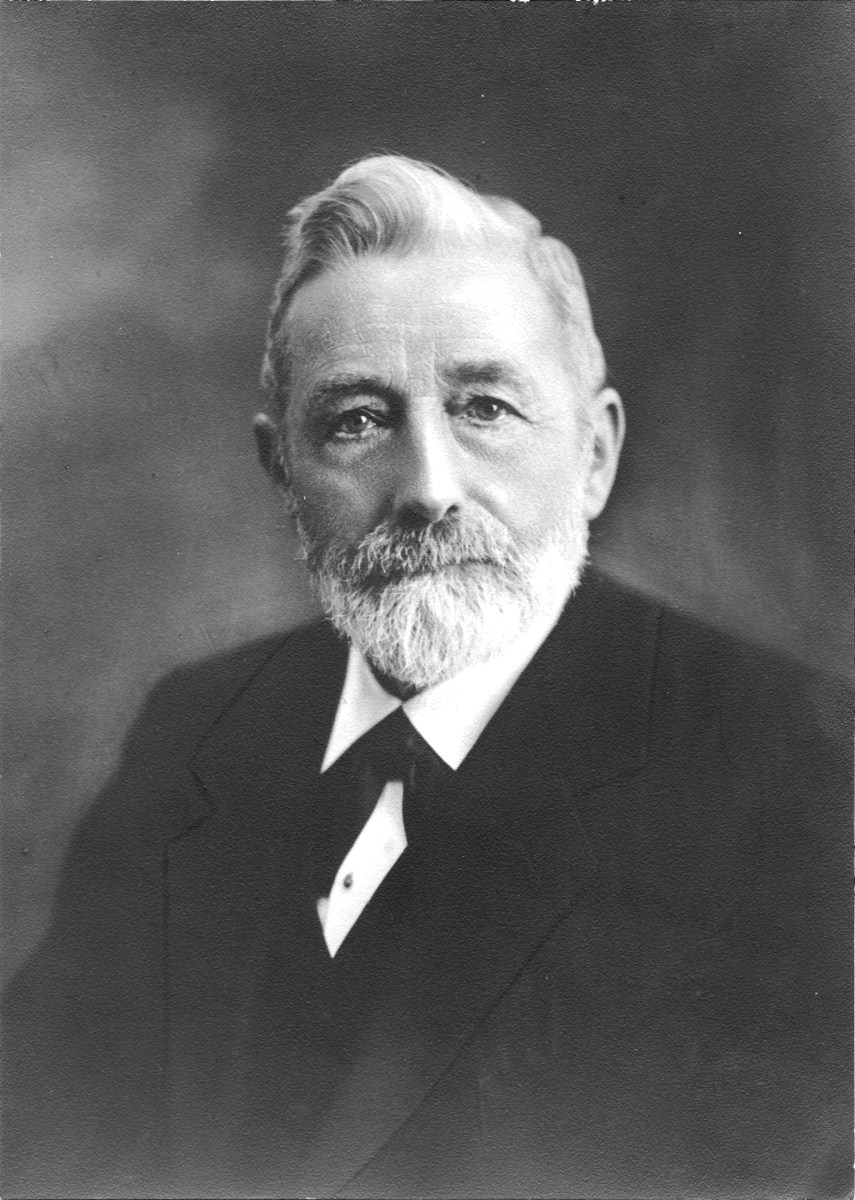
Aart den Boer

Aart den Boer (30 December 1852 in Nieuw-Lekkerland – 11 May 1941) was a Dutch architect and contractor.

== Life ==
Den Boer began his career as a carpenter and, through evening classes, became teacher of technical drawings (and later superintendent of construction). He was also an assistant to C. Smit, director of the shipping company Reederij op de Lek, which ran paddleboat services on the river Lek to Rotterdam.

He designed the steam oil mill "De Toekomst" ("The Future" in Dutch) and the retirement home of L. en N. Smit's foundation that was built in 1885 in Nieuw-Lekkerland which was later used from 1958 to 1996 as town hall. Aart, along with his brother Jan, founded the concrete factory J. & A. den Boer in 1883 in Nieuw-Lekkerland, which was established there until 2019. Aart den Boer was active as councilor and deputy mayor of Nieuw-Lekkerland and chairman of the school board of a Christian school.

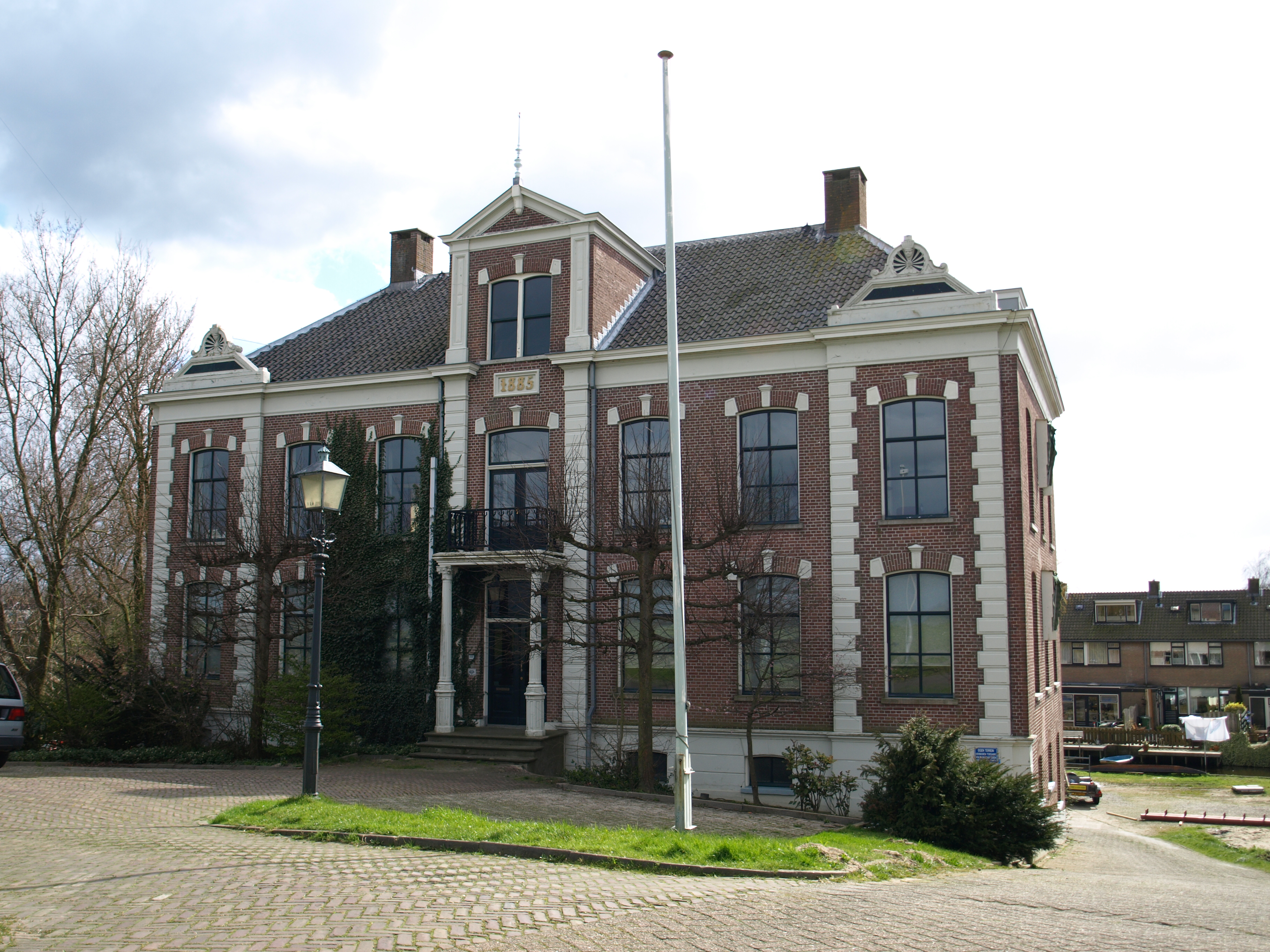
Building den Boer designed, also used as town hall.
