= Reformed Church, Nieuw-Lekkerland =

Church in Nieuw-Lekkerland, Netherlands

Coordinates: 51.8913°N 4.6882°E

The Reformed Church in Nieuw-Lekkerland is the biggest and oldest church in Nieuw-Lekkerland, Netherlands. The church was built in 1848, but it is nearly sure that there was a church before. The architect was D. Slingerland. There are 1.125 seats. The pulpit is from the 17th century.

== Ministers ==
- W. Hovius 1961–1966
- Tjitze de Jong 1969–1974
- W. Verboom 1978–1983
- H. Penning 1984–1992
- C. van den Berg 1992–1997
- J. Belder 1997–2002
- J. van den Berg 2002–2008
- J. Volk 2002–2007
- J. Zuijderduijn 2007–2013
- E. Gouda 2009–
