= Nederlek =

- Former municipality
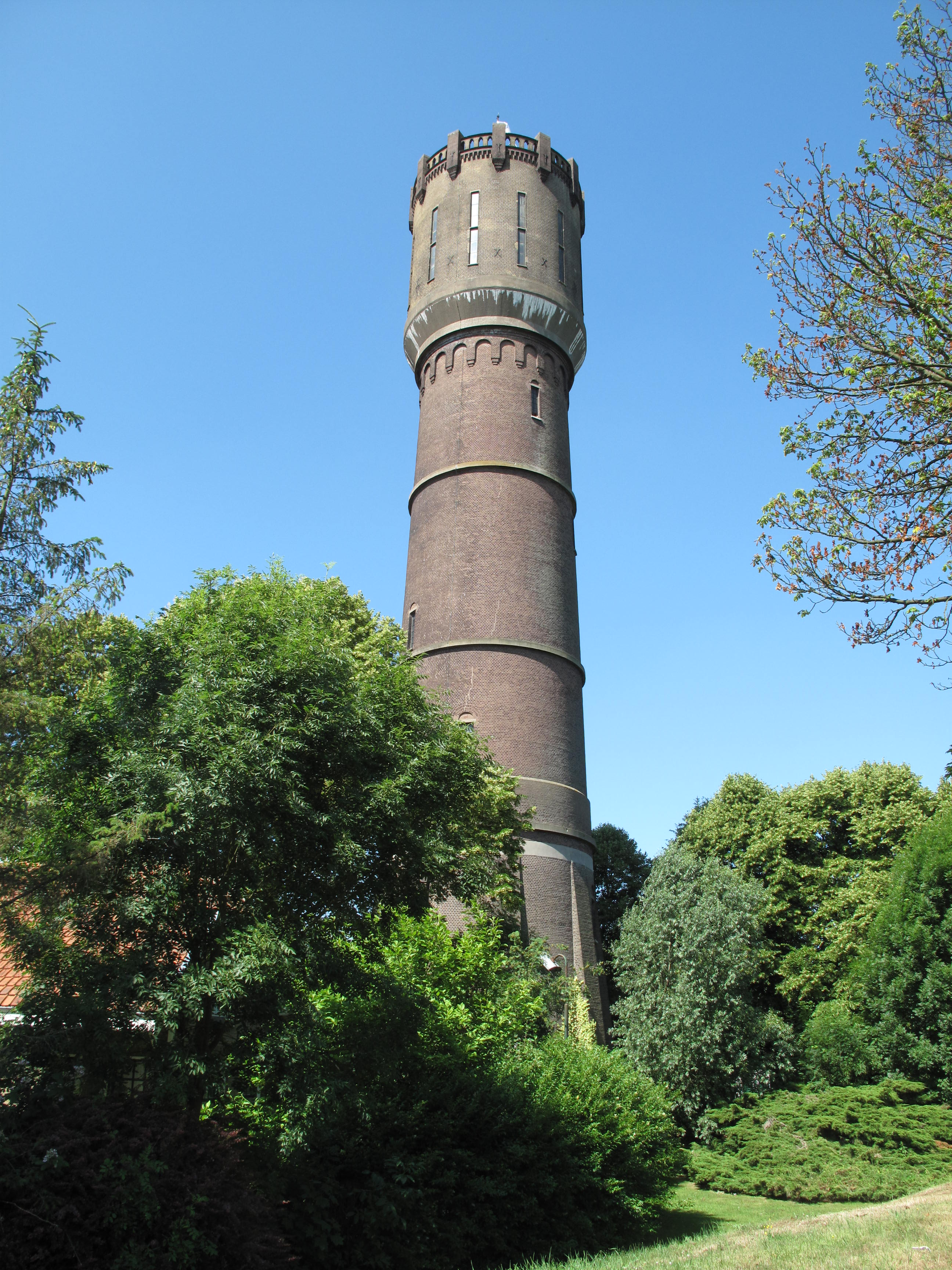
- Water tower in Krimpen aan de Lek

- Flag Coat of arms

- Location in South Holland
- Coordinates: 51°54′38″N 04°39′38″E
- Country: Netherlands
- Province: South Holland
- Municipality: Krimpenerwaard
- Established: 1 January 1985

Area
  - Total: 31.24 km^{2} (12.06 sq mi)
  - Land: 27.82 km^{2} (10.74 sq mi)
  - Water: 3.42 km^{2} (1.32 sq mi)
- Elevation: −1 m (−3.3 ft)

Population (January 2021)
  - Total: data missing
- Time zone: UTC+1 (CET)
  - Summer (DST): UTC+2 (CEST)
- Postcode: 2930–2931, 2940–2941
- Area code: 0180
- Website: www.nederlek.nl

Nederlek (Dutch pronunciation: [ˈneːdərlɛk]) is a former municipality in the western Netherlands, in the province of South Holland. Since 2015 it has been a part of the municipality of Krimpenerwaard.

The former municipality covered an area of 31.24 km^{2} (12.06 sq mi) of which 3.42 km^{2} (1.32 sq mi) was covered by water. It was formed on 1 January 1985, by the amalgamation of the municipalities Krimpen aan de Lek and Lekkerkerk. Its name means "Lower Lek", a reference to its location on the Lek River.

There is no town called Nederlek; the former municipality consisted of the population centres Krimpen aan de Lek and Lekkerkerk. The last town gained notoriety in 1980 when a large amount of toxic waste was found underneath a residential area built in the 1970s. The cost of cleaning up the mess ran up to 188 million guilders (approximately 90 million US dollars).

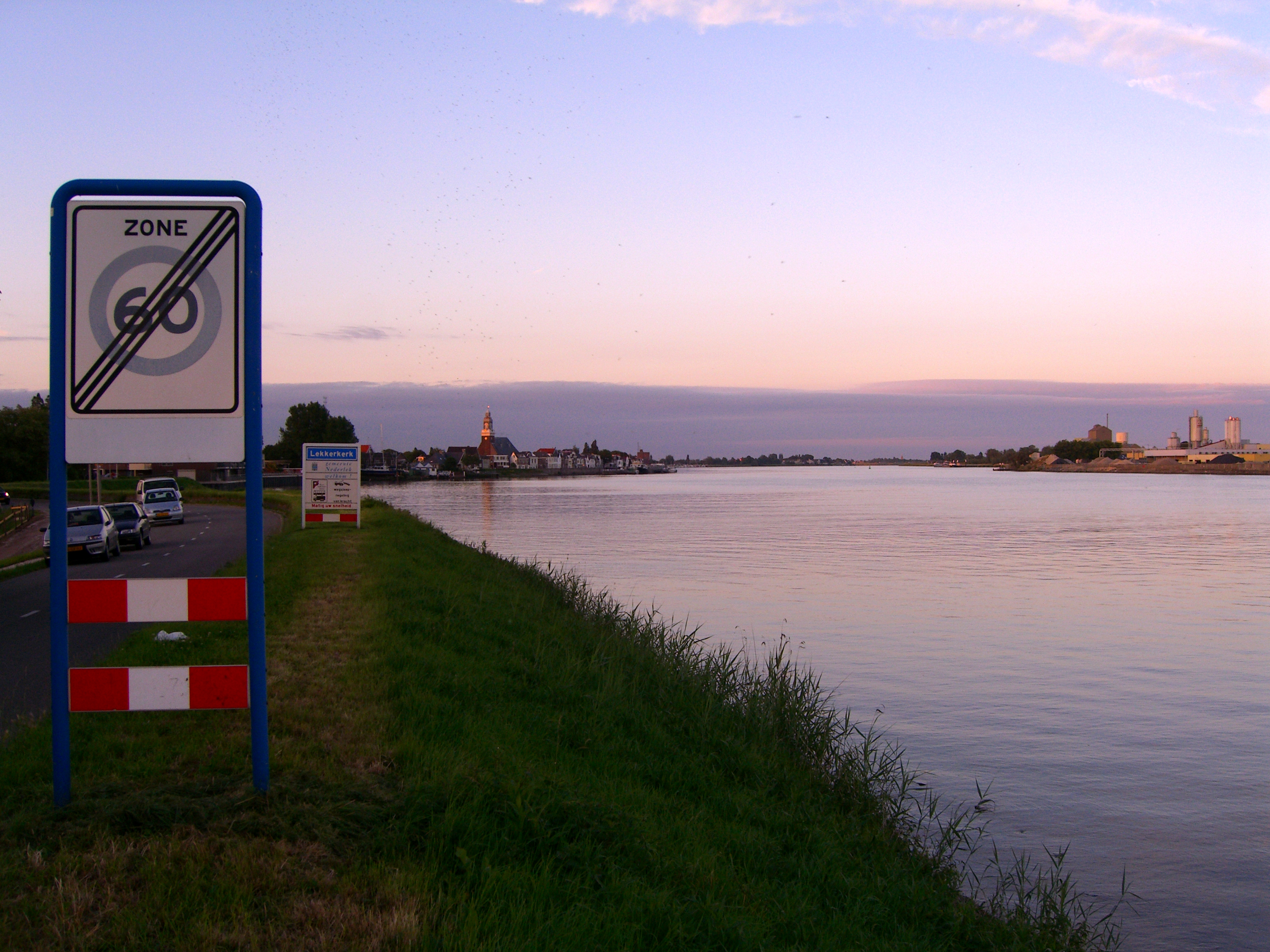
View of Lek River and Lekkerkerk in the distance.
