= USS Maryland =

Four ships of the U.S. Navy have been named USS Maryland:

- USS Maryland (1799), a sloop during the Napoleonic Wars
- USS Maryland (ACR-8), a Pennsylvania-class cruiser, saw action in World War I, later renamed USS Frederick
- USS Maryland (BB-46), a Colorado-class battleship known as "Fighting Mary," saw action in World War II
- USS Maryland (SSBN-738), an Ohio-class ballistic missile submarine, commissioned in 1992, currently in active service
