= Nieuw-Lekkerland =

- Town and former municipality
- Flag Coat of arms

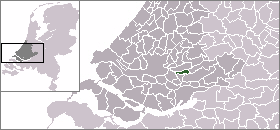
- Country: Netherlands
- Province: South Holland
- Municipality: Molenlanden

Area (2006)
  - Total: 12.77 km^{2} (4.93 sq mi)
  - Land: 10.40 km^{2} (4.02 sq mi)
  - Water: 2.38 km^{2} (0.92 sq mi)

Population (1 January 2007)
  - Total: 9,436
  - Density: 907/km^{2} (2,350/sq mi)
- Source: CBS, Statline.
- Time zone: UTC+1 (CET)
  - Summer (DST): UTC+2 (CEST)

Nieuw-Lekkerland (Dutch pronunciation: [niu ˈlɛkərˌlɑnt]) is a town in the western Netherlands, in the province of South Holland. It is situated on the southern shores of the Lek River, in the north-west of the Alblasserwaard.

The town's name evolved slightly over time: in 1280 Leckerlant, in 1331 Niewe Leckerland, and in 1903 Nieuw Lekkerland. It means "land of or near the river Lek" with the addition of "nieuw" ("new") to distinguish it from Old Lekkerland (now Lekkerkerk) across the river.

== History ==
The name Nieue-Leckelant appears for the first time around 1325. The most notable building used to be Castle Schoonenburg. Because of its elevated location on a mount, it served as a refuge for the people during floods before the reclamation of the Alblasserwaard. After 1456, the castle was abandoned and became a ruin. Its remains were thereafter probably used to rebuild a church tower. Only the mount is still visible. In 1848, the Reformed Church was built.

Nieuw-Lekkerland's economy was based on agriculture, cattle raising, and fishing. In the 19th century, ship building and industry developed, resulting in an increasing population: from 770 in 1820, 1153 in 1840, 2000 in 1867, to 9400 in 2004.

In 2013, the municipality of Nieuw-Lekkerland merged into the new municipality of Molenwaard. In 2019, Molenwaard merged into Molenlanden.

== Attractions ==
The number one attraction nearby are the adjacent windmills at Kinderdijk.

In Nieuw-Lekkerland, a retirement home on the Lek dike was built in 1885, designed by Aart den Boer. It was commissioned as a dike management house by Leendert Smit Fopzoon, Ambachtsheer van Nieuw-Lekkerland and his spouse Neeltje Smit. The eclectic-styled building has space for about 15 inhabitants and a landlord. The basement houses the kitchen, the ground floor holds the common room and the second floor contains the room of the regent.

== Gallery ==
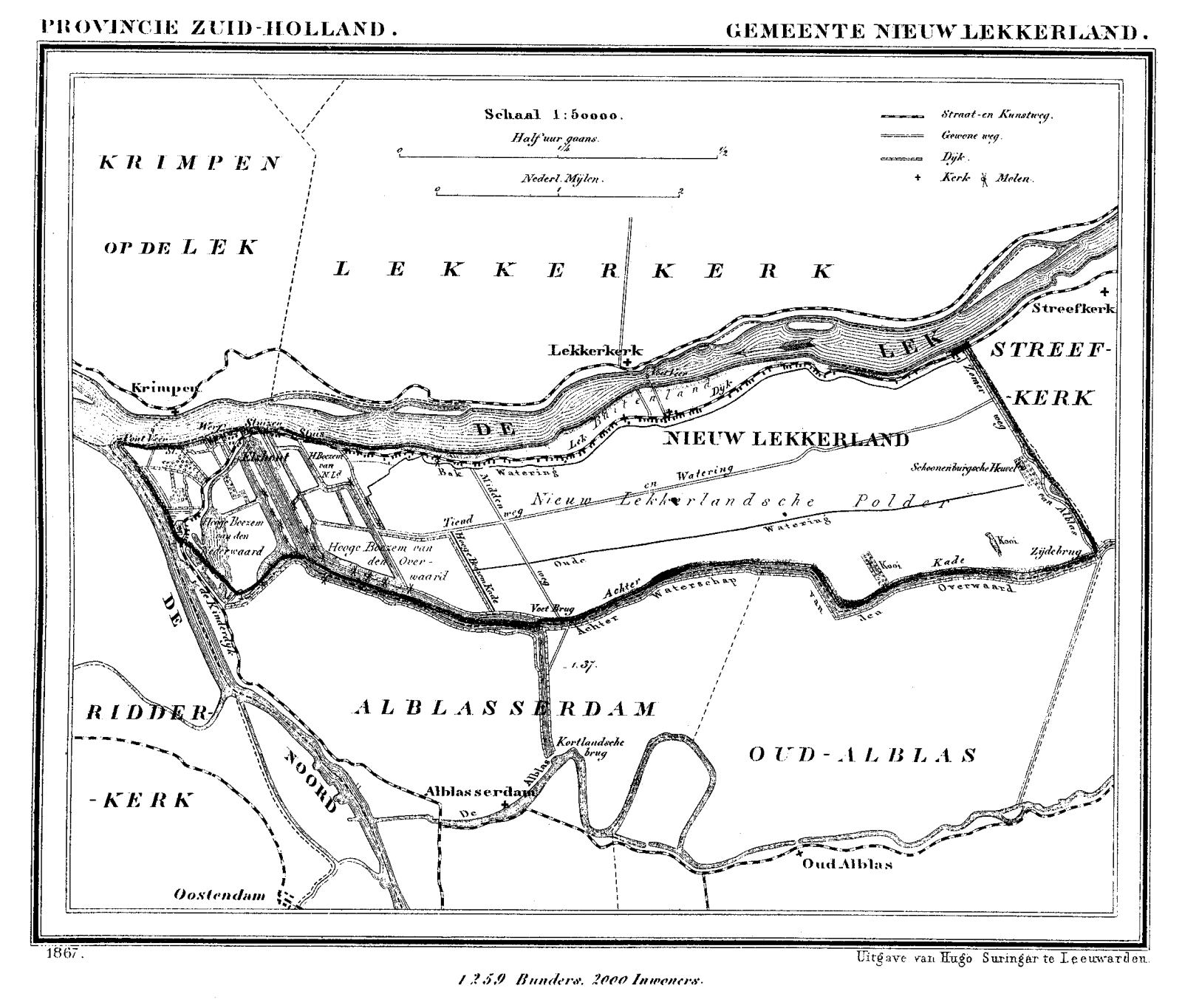
Nieuw-Lekkerland in 1867

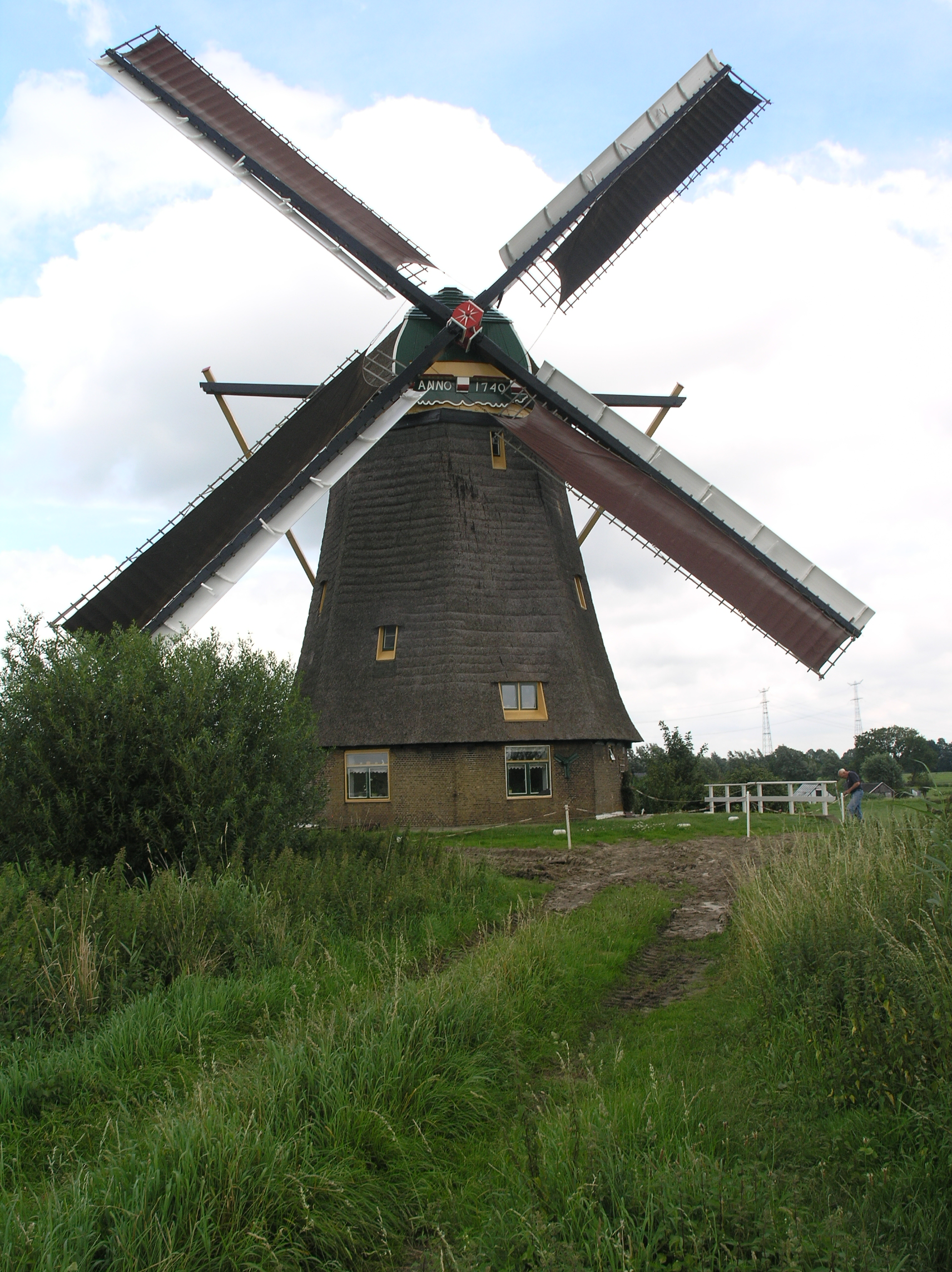
De Hoge Molen in Nieuw-Lekkerland

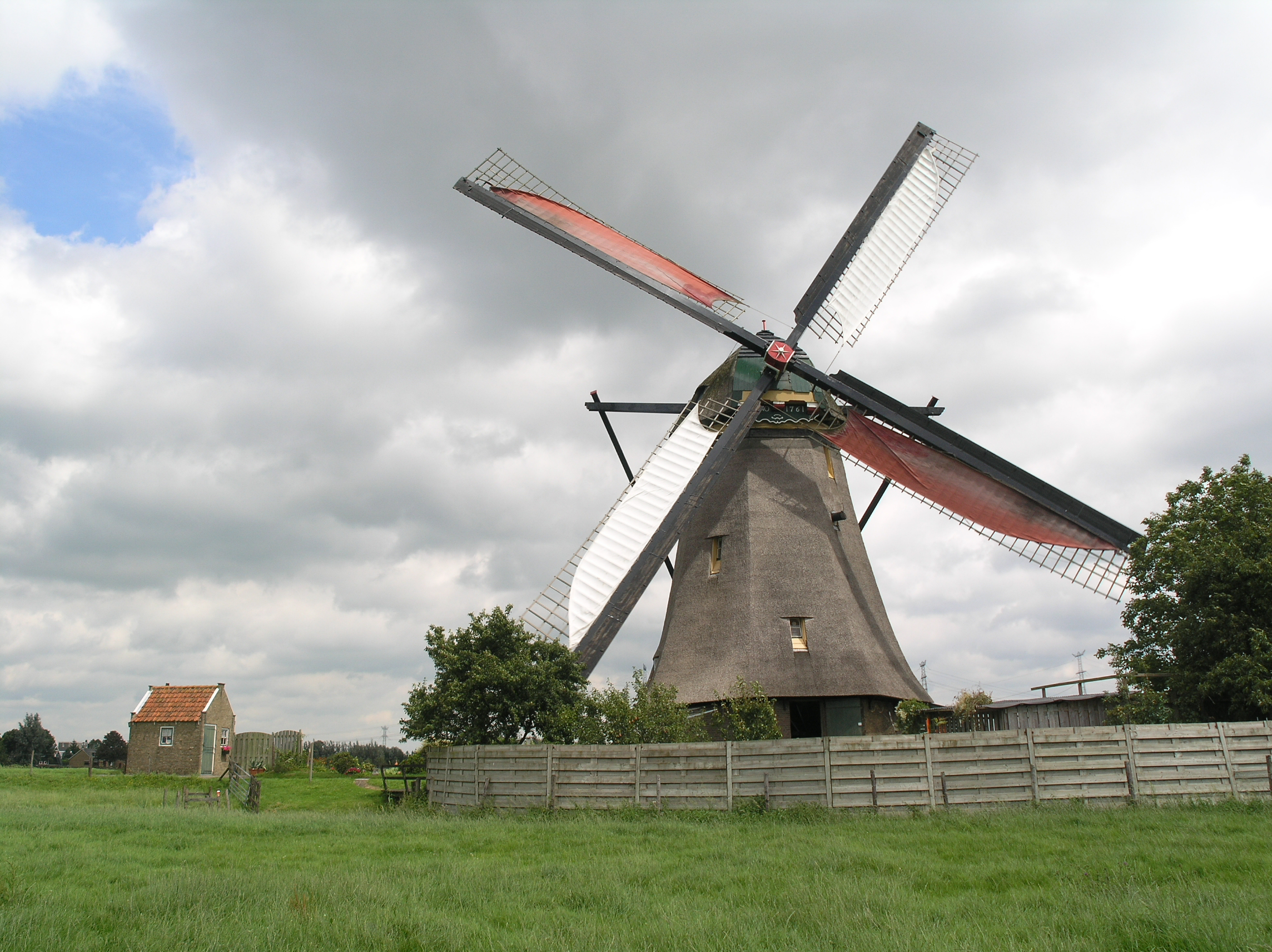
Kleine of Lage Molen in Nieuw-Lekkerland

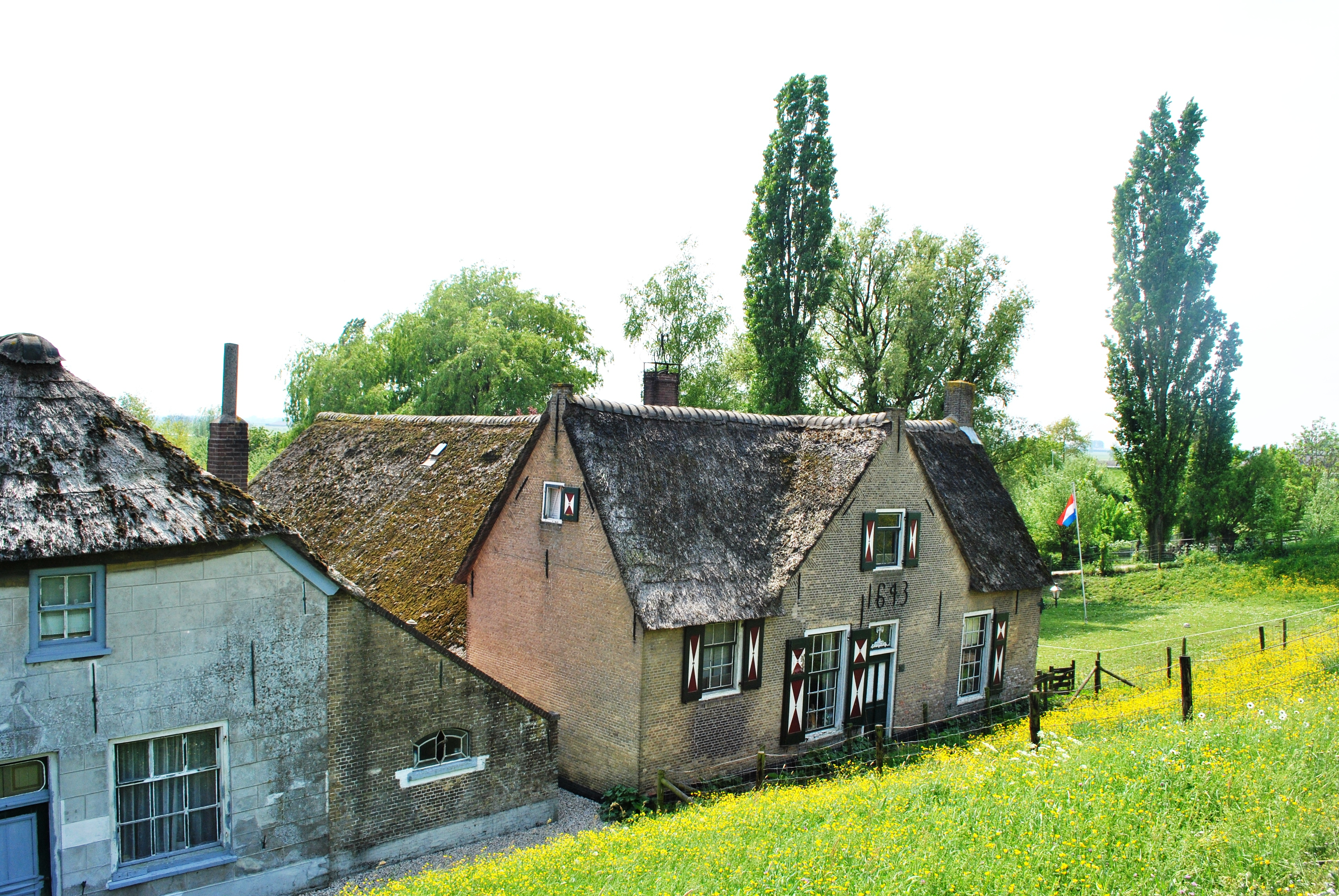
House in Nieuw-Lekkerland, built in 1643
