= MV Greenpeace =

Coordinates: 51.916617°N 4.246980°E

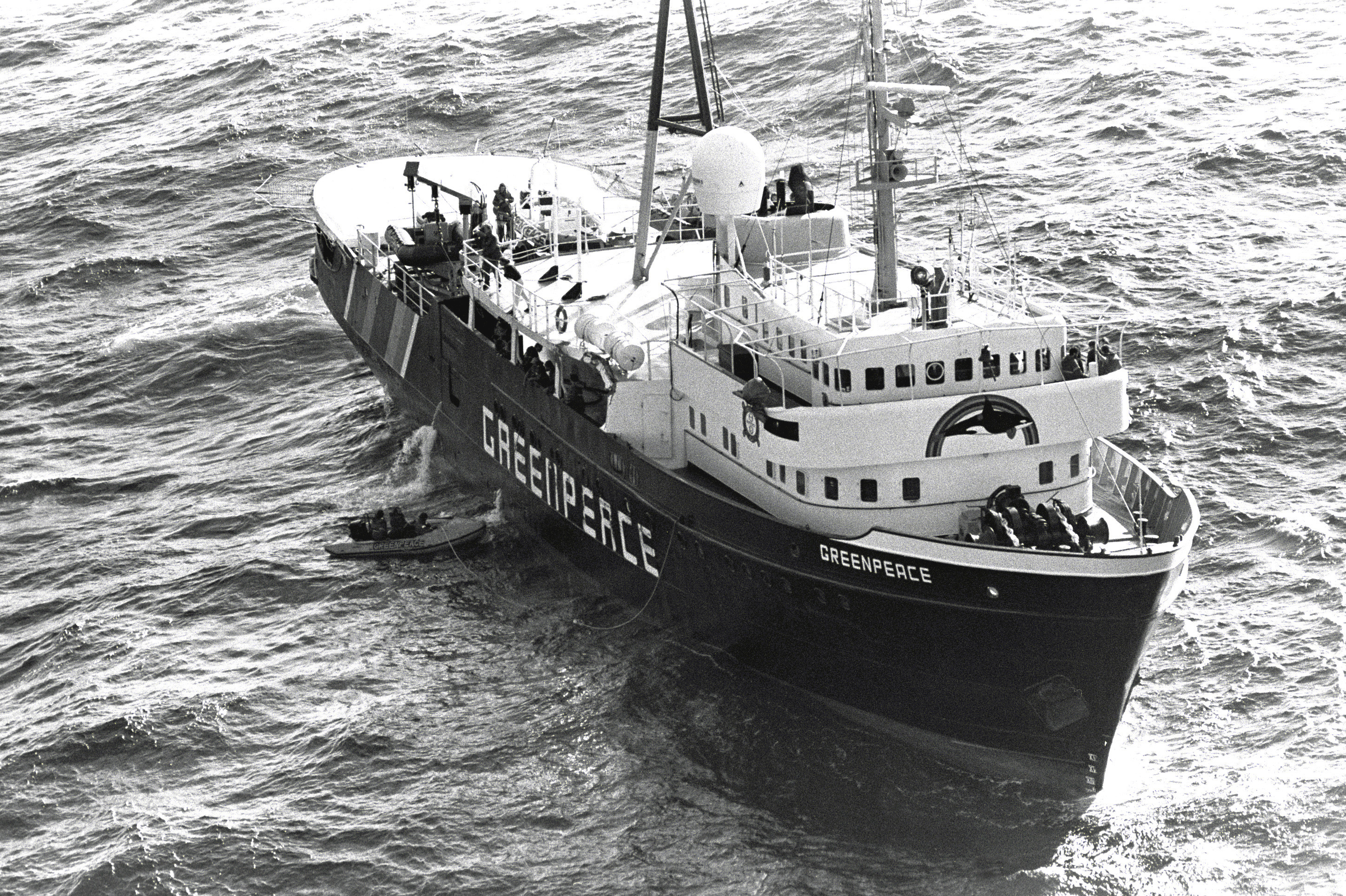

History
- Name: MV Greenpeace
- Operator: Greenpeace
- Builder: J. & K. Smit
- Launched: 14 October 1958
- Completed: 1959
- Acquired: 1977
- Identification: Call sign: PC8023 → PDWN; IMO number: 5100427; MMSI number: 244532000
- Status: In service
- Notes: Registered at Amsterdam, Netherlands (1990–2001)

General characteristics
- Class & type: Oceangoing tug/Salvage vessel
- Tonnage: 1,176 BRT
- Length: 58.06 m
- Beam: 11.22 m
- Draught: 5.2 m
- Propulsion: Two main Diesel, Smit M.A.N. RB 666/7
- Speed: 13.5 knots
- Boats & landing craft carried: 1 Avon Searider SR 7.4 m.; 3 Avon D465 RIB
- Capacity: 38
- Notes: Call sign: PC8023

The MV Greenpeace (formerly (Elbe: 1959–1977) and since 2002 known as the Elbe) was a Greenpeace ship built in 1959 as an oceangoing tug/salvage vessel. She was purchased by Greenpeace in 1985 from the Maryland Pilotage Company, the vessel then being named MV Maryland, and transferred back to the Netherlands to be refitted with modern equipment before being recommissioned. She took over from the first Rainbow Warrior, which had been sunk in 1985 by French commandos. In 2001 she was replaced by the MV Esperanza.

== Ordering and construction ==
On 14 October 1958 J. & K. Smit launched the sea-going tug as Elbe for Smit International.

== Career ==
During her 15 years of service with Greenpeace, the MV or Black Pig as she was known by her crew, circumnavigated the globe several times, participating in numerous campaigns. Her first deployment was as part of the "World Park Antarctica" campaign but following the sinking of the Rainbow Warrior, she was diverted en route from Europe to New Zealand via the Panama canal, to first participate as part of a peace convoy protesting against French Nuclear Testing at Moruroa Atoll, before continuing to carry on with the Antarctica campaign as planned. The next decade and a half saw her involved in Greenpeace campaigns around the world, from the Persian Gulf to the Antarctic.

Whilst participating in protests against the US testing of Trident missiles in 1989, the Greenpeace was rammed by the US Navy vessel, the USS Kittiwake (ASR-13) multiple times. In late 1993 crew aboard the ship exposed Russian ships dumping 900 tonnes of liquid radioactive waste into the Sea of Japan. Protests against the resumption of French nuclear testing in French Polynesia followed in 1995. During this time the vessel was boarded and detained by French police in international waters.

The Greenpeace was replaced in 2001 by the MV Esperanza. She has since been reconverted to her original form as the Elbe and is now a museum ship in Maassluis.
