= USS Maryland (1799) =

Sloops-of-war of the United States Navy

History

United States
- Name: USS Maryland
- Launched: 3 June 1799
- Commissioned: August 1799
- Decommissioned: 2 October 1801
- Fate: Sold, 2 October 1801

General characteristics
- Type: Sloop-of-war
- Tonnage: 380
- Propulsion: Sail
- Complement: 180 officers and enlisted
- Armament: 20 × 9-pounder guns; 6 × 6-pounder guns

USS Maryland was a sloop-of-war in the United States Navy. She served during the Quasi-War with France.

Maryland was built by public subscription in Baltimore under the Act of 30 June 1798; launched at Price Shipyard, Baltimore, 3 June 1799; and accepted by the Navy in August 1799, Captain John Rodgers in command.

Maryland departed Baltimore 13 September 1799 for the Surinam station. Arriving 1 October, the sloop cruised from French Guiana to Curaçao protecting American shipping from attacks by French warships and privateers. The Napoleonic Wars were ongoing in Europe and the French were searching and seizing merchant vessels trading with the British West Indies, causing much loss to American commerce. Maryland captured the schooner Clarissa, an American slave trader without papers 4 January 1800, and then on 26 July fell in with and recaptured without a fight the Portuguese brig Gloria da Mar, which had been captured by French privateer Cherry of Bourdeaux 13 days previous.

The sloop left Surinam for home 9 August 1800, having served since December 1799 as the only American naval vessel on the Surinam station. Sailing by way of St. Kitts, and St. Thomas, Maryland escorted a large convoy of American and British merchant vessels to safe waters, in addition to capturing Aerial, an American merchantman on 2 September. Aerial had been trading with the enemy and arraigned a fake capture by a privateer as cover. On 10 September 1800 she set sail for St. Thomas, Virgin Islands, with USS Eagle, escorting a convoy of 52 ships. On an unknown date she and the USS Maryland recaptured the brig Mahitable.

Maryland arrived at Baltimore on 1 October for repairs. In a letter dated 20 February to Josiah Parker, Chaiman of the Committee on Naval Affairs, Navy Secretary Stoddert recommended selling her. The sloop departed Baltimore on 22 March 1801 with Congressman John Dawson of Virginia, President Adams' designated bearer of the amended and ratified Treaty of Mortefontaine with France, and arrived Havre de Grâce, France, in early May. The sloop remained until 15 July, when, because of difficulties in obtaining ratification, she was released by Congressman Dawson and sent home. Carrying several diplomatic passengers and important letters and dispatches, she returned to her home port in Baltimore on 28 August. Captain Rodgers discharged the crew and then sold Maryland on 2 October 1801 for $20,200.
