= Krimpen aan de Lek =

- Flag Coat of arms
- Interactive map of Krimpen aan de Lek
- Coordinates: 51°53′35″N 4°37′39″E
- Country: Netherlands
- Province: South Holland
- Municipality: Krimpenerwaard

Population (2006)
  - Total: 6,540

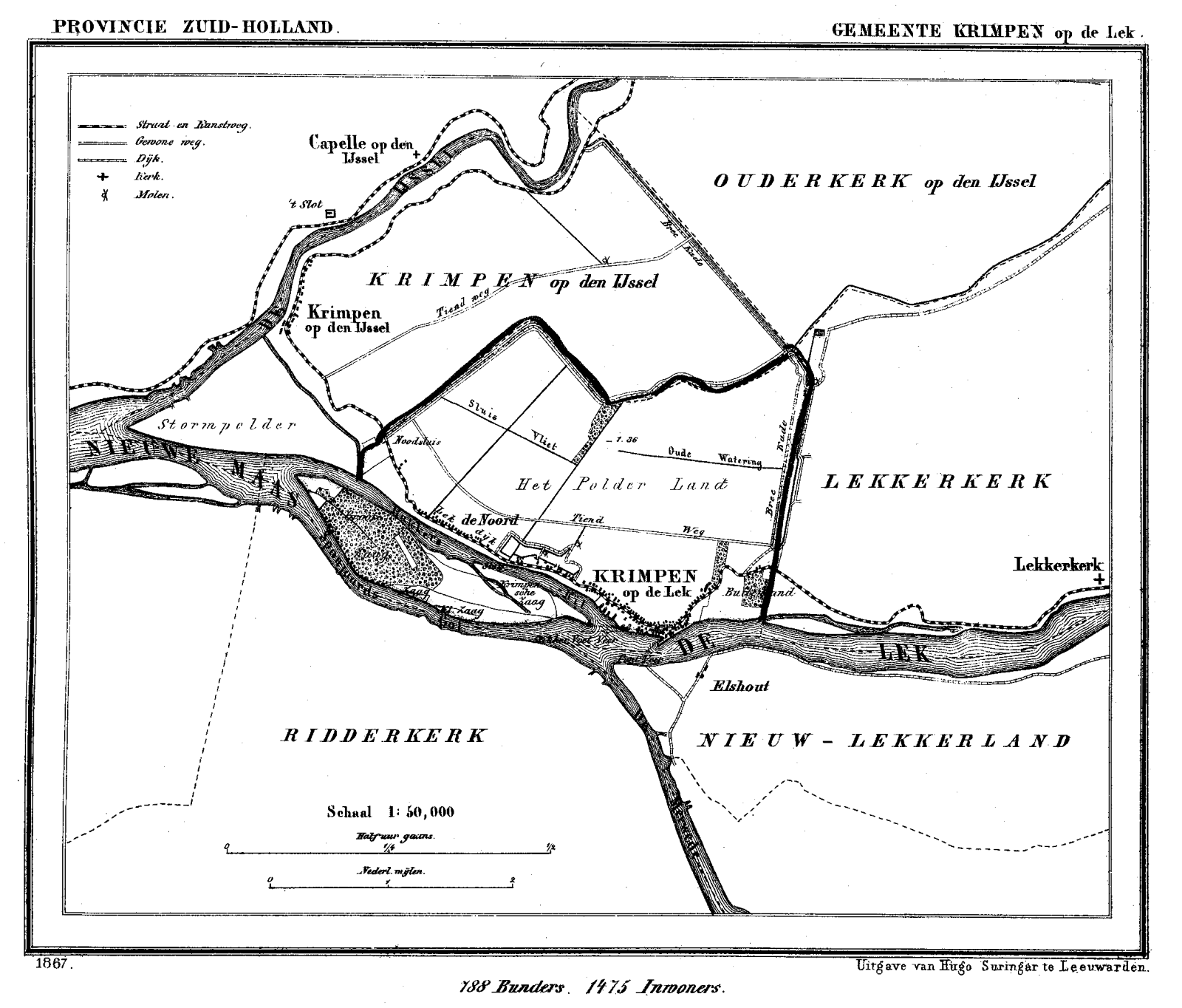
Krimpen aan de Lek in 1867.

Krimpen aan de Lek is a village on the Lek River in the municipality of Krimpenerwaard, province of South Holland, the Netherlands. It had 6,607 inhabitants in 2008.

The name Krimpen comes from the archaic word "Krempener", meaning "river crossing". Therefore, Krimpen aan de Lek means "Crossing on the Lek".

Krimpen aan de Lek is considered a quiet and scenic village. There are 3 elementary schools within its boundaries.

Krimpen aan de Lek was a separate municipality,until 1985, when it merged with Lekkerkerk to create the new municipality of Nederlek.

== Gallery ==
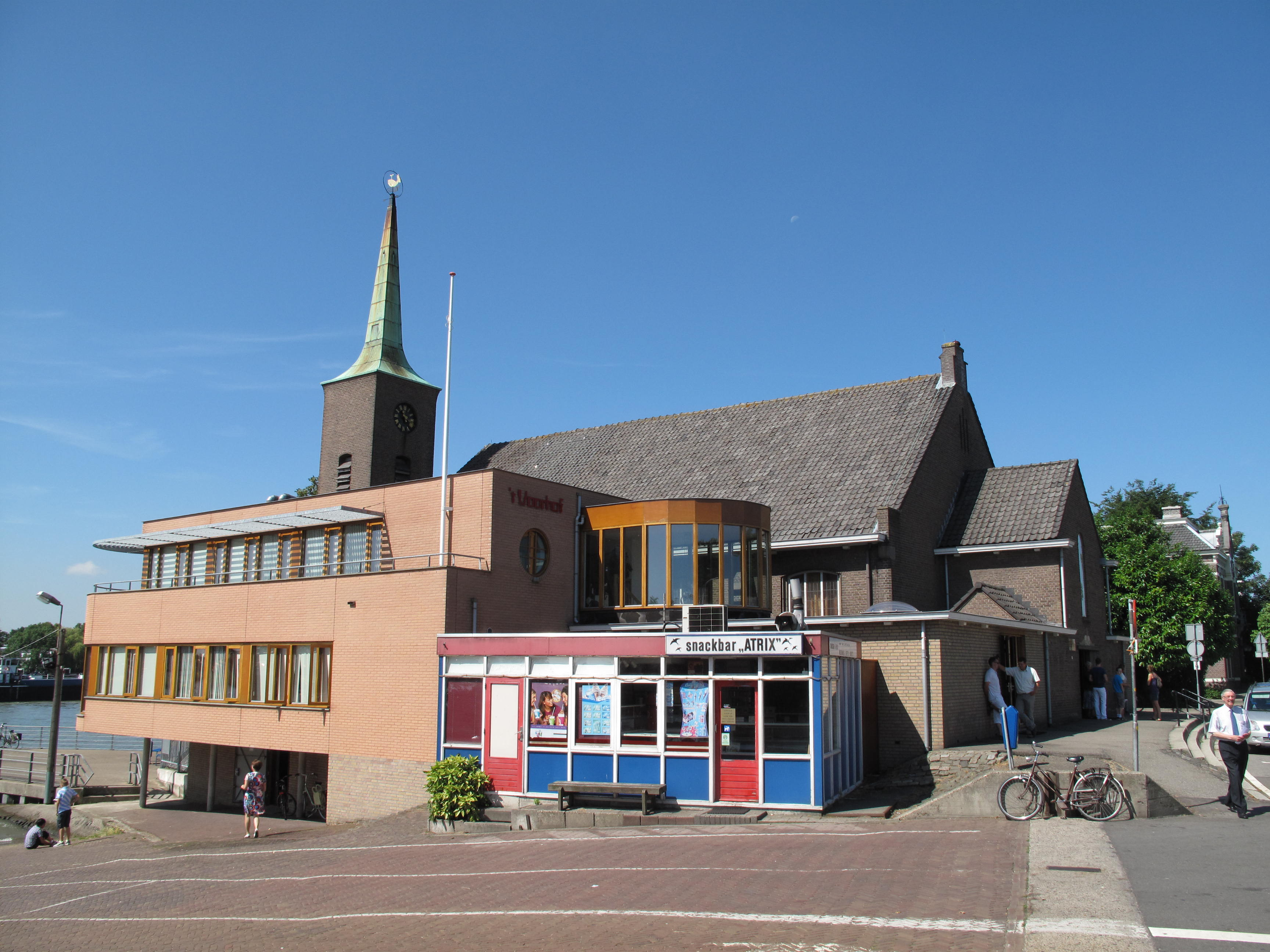
Krimpen ad Lek, church

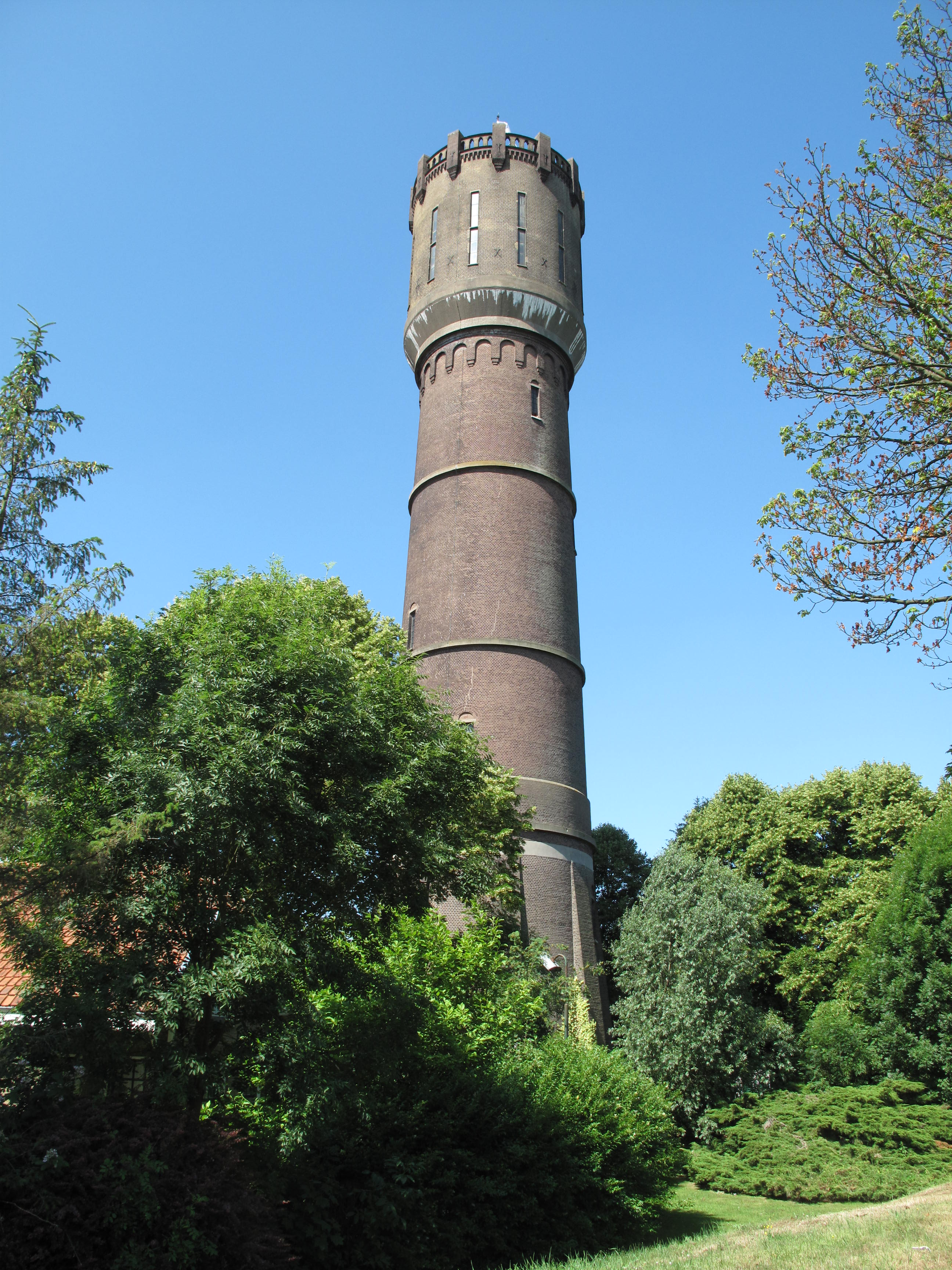
Krimpen ad Lek, water tower

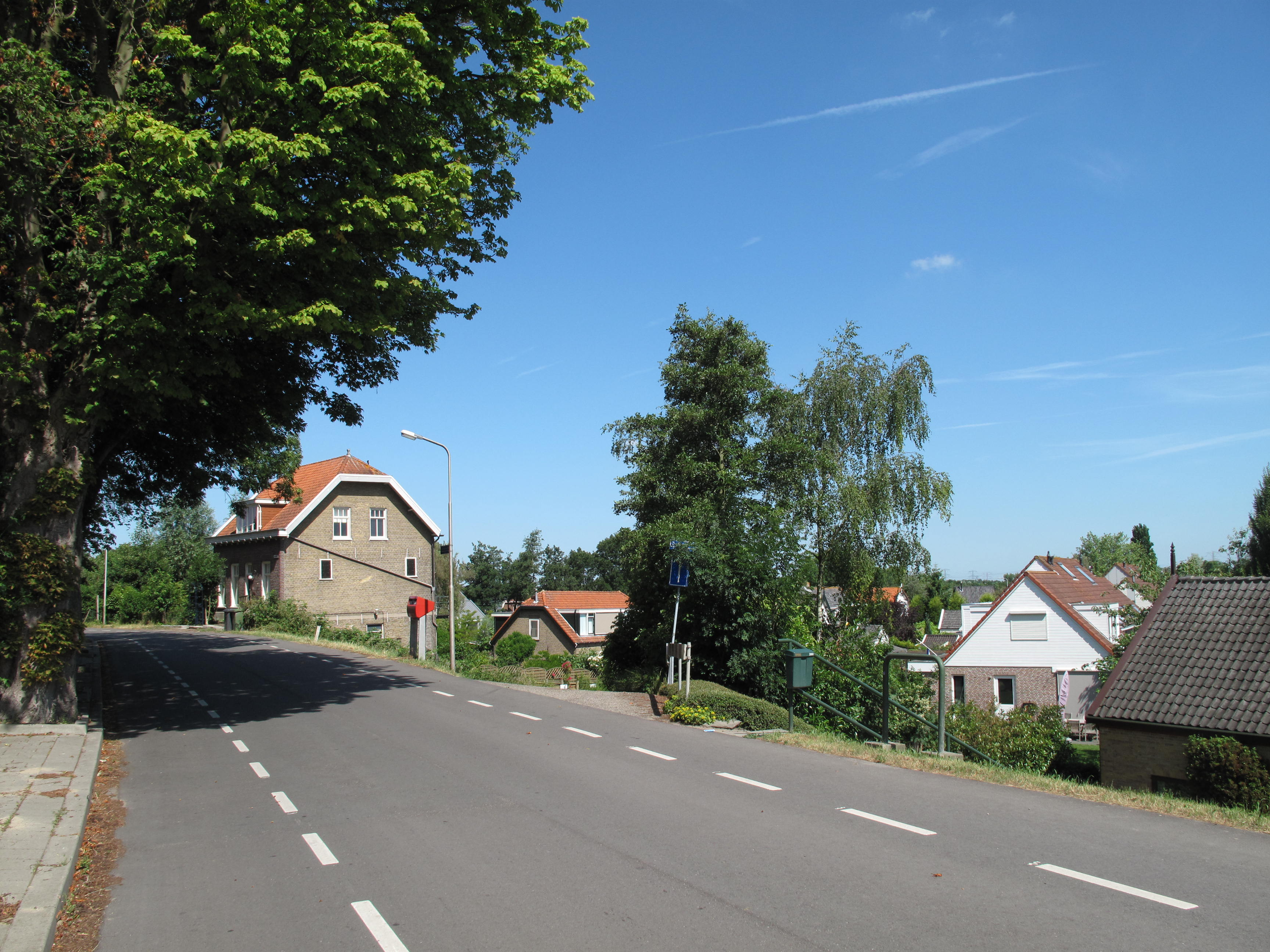
Krimpen ad Lek, view to a street
