= July 19 =

July 19 this year in various calendars
- Sunday, 19 July 2026
Akan	Kurukwasi
Armenian	4 Aweleach 1475
Aztec	Quecholli 10, 9 Tecpatl
Babylonian	4 Du'uzu, 2337 SE
Balinese pawukon	Menga, Pasah, Menala, Paing, Paniron, Redite of Pahang, Uma, Nohan, Sri
Bengali	4 Shrabon, BS 1433
Chinese	Yang Wood Horse・Star Mansion; Fire Horse Year, Month 6, Day 6 (Xiaoshu, 4 days until Dashu)
Common Era	19 July 2026 CE
Coptic	12 Epip, AM 1742
Egyptian	4 Choiak, 2775 NE
Ethiopian	12 Ḥamlē, 2018 Amätä Məhrät
French Republican	Décade I, Primidi de Thermidor de l'Année 234 de la République
Gregorian	19 July, AD 2026
Hebrew	5 Av, AM 5786
Hindu	Uttaraphalgunī・Varīyas; Solar: 3 Śrāvaṇa, 1948 SE; Lunisolar: Pañcamī, Śukla pakṣa of Āṣāḍha, 2083 VE; Rāudra・5127 KY・1,872,775
Icelandic	Sunnudagur, 28 Sólmánuður 2026
Islamic	3 Safar, AH 1448 (using tabular method)
ISO week date	2026-W29-7
Japanese	6 Minazuki, Reiwa 8 (Shōsho, 4 days until Taisho)
Julian	6 July, AD 2026 (AM 7534)
Julian day	2461241
Korean	6 Yangdal, 4359 DE
Maya	13.0.13.13.18; 11 Xul, 9 Etznab
Roman	Pridie Nonas Iulias, MMDCCLXXIX AUC
Solar Hijri	28 Tir, SH 1405
Tibetan	5 chu stod, me pho rta 2153 or 1772 or 1000

<<	July					>>
Su	Mo	Tu	We	Th	Fr	Sa
			1	2	3	4
5	6	7	8	9	10	11
12	13	14	15	16	17	18
19	20	21	22	23	24	25
26	27	28	29	30	31
2026

July 19 in recent years
2026 (Sunday)
2025 (Saturday)
2024 (Friday)
2023 (Wednesday)
2022 (Tuesday)
2021 (Monday)
2020 (Sunday)
2019 (Friday)
2018 (Thursday)
2017 (Wednesday)

July 19 is the 200th day of the year (201st in leap years) in the Gregorian calendar; 165 days remain until the end of the year.

== Events ==
=== Pre-1600 ===
- 64 – The Great Fire of Rome causes widespread devastation and rages on for six days, destroying half of the city.
- 484 – Leontius, Roman usurper, is crowned Eastern emperor at Tarsus (modern Turkey). He is recognized in Antioch and makes it his capital.
- 711 – Umayyad conquest of Hispania: Battle of Guadalete: Umayyad forces under Tariq ibn Ziyad defeat the Visigoths led by King Roderic.
- 803 – Bardanes Tourkos is proclaimed emperor by rebellious Byzantine troops.
- 939 – Battle of Simancas: King Ramiro II of León defeats the Moorish army under Caliph Abd-al-Rahman III near the city of Simancas.
- 998 – Arab–Byzantine wars: Battle of Apamea: Fatimids defeat a Byzantine army near Apamea.
- 1333 – Wars of Scottish Independence: The English win a decisive victory over the Scots in the battle of Halidon Hill.
- 1544 – Italian War of 1542–46: The first Siege of Boulogne begins.
- 1545 – The Tudor warship Mary Rose sinks off Portsmouth; in 1982 the wreck is salvaged in one of the most complex and expensive projects in the history of maritime archaeology.
- 1553 – The attempt to install Lady Jane Grey as Queen of England collapses after only nine days.
- 1588 – Anglo-Spanish War: Battle of Gravelines: The Spanish Armada is sighted in the English Channel.

=== 1601–1900 ===
- 1701 – Representatives of the Iroquois Confederacy sign the Nanfan Treaty, ceding a large territory north of the Ohio River to England.
- 1702 – Great Northern War: A numerically superior Polish-Saxon army of Augustus II the Strong, operating from an advantageous defensive position, is defeated by a Swedish army half its size under the command of King Charles XII in the Battle of Klissow.
- 1733 – The Ottoman army defeats the Iranian army under Nader Shah in the battle of Baghdad.
- 1817 – Unsuccessful in his attempt to conquer the Kingdom of Hawaiʻi for the Russian-American Company, Georg Anton Schäffer is forced to admit defeat and leave Kauaʻi.
- 1821 – Coronation of George IV as King of the United Kingdom.
- 1832 – The British Medical Association is founded as the Provincial Medical and Surgical Association by Sir Charles Hastings at a meeting in the Board Room of the Worcester Infirmary.
- 1843 – Brunel's steamship the SS Great Britain is launched, becoming the first ocean-going craft with an iron hull and screw propeller, becoming the largest vessel afloat in the world.
- 1845 – Great New York City Fire of 1845: The last great fire to affect Manhattan begins early in the morning and is subdued that afternoon. The fire kills four firefighters and 26 civilians and destroys 345 buildings.
- 1848 – Women's rights: A two-day Women's Rights Convention opens in Seneca Falls, New York.
- 1863 – American Civil War: Morgan's Raid: At Buffington Island in Ohio, Confederate General John Hunt Morgan's raid into the north is mostly thwarted when a large group of his men are captured while trying to escape across the Ohio River.
- 1864 – Taiping Rebellion: Third Battle of Nanking: The Qing dynasty finally defeats the Taiping Heavenly Kingdom.
- 1870 – Franco-Prussian War: France declares war on Prussia.
- 1900 – The first line of the Paris Metro opens for operation.

=== 1901–present ===
- 1903 – Maurice Garin wins the first Tour de France.
- 1916 – World War I: Battle of Fromelles: British and Australian troops attack German trenches as part of the Battle of the Somme.
- 1934 – The rigid airship USS Macon surprises the USS Houston near Clipperton Island with a mail delivery for President Franklin D. Roosevelt, demonstrating its potential for tracking ships at sea.
- 1936 – Spanish Civil War: The CNT and UGT call a general strike in Spain – mobilizing workers' militias against the Nationalist forces. People's Olympiad of Barcelona cancelled.
- 1940 – World War II: Battle of Cape Spada: The Royal Navy and the Regia Marina clash; the Italian light cruiser Bartolomeo Colleoni sinks, with 121 casualties.
- 1940 – Field Marshal Ceremony: First occasion in World War II that Adolf Hitler appoints field marshals due to military achievements.
- 1940 – World War II: Army order 112 forms the Intelligence Corps of the British Army.
- 1942 – World War II: The Second Happy Time of Hitler's submarines comes to an end, as the increasingly effective American convoy system compels them to return to the central Atlantic.
- 1943 – World War II: Rome is heavily bombed by more than 500 Allied aircraft, inflicting thousands of casualties.
- 1947 – Prime Minister of the shadow Burmese government, Bogyoke Aung San and eight others are assassinated.
- 1947 – Korean politician Lyuh Woon-hyung is assassinated.
- 1952 – Opening of the Summer Olympics in Helsinki, Finland.
- 1957 – The largely autobiographical novel The Ordeal of Gilbert Pinfold by Evelyn Waugh is published.
- 1961 – Tunisia imposes a blockade on the French naval base at Bizerte; the French would capture the entire town four days later.
- 1963 – Joe Walker flies a North American X-15 to a record altitude of 106,010 meters (347,800 feet) on X-15 Flight 90. Exceeding an altitude of 100 km, this flight qualifies as a human spaceflight under international convention.
- 1964 – Vietnam War: At a rally in Saigon, South Vietnamese Prime Minister Nguyễn Khánh calls for expanding the war into North Vietnam.
- 1967 – Piedmont Airlines Flight 22, a Piedmont Airlines Boeing 727-22, and a twin-engine Cessna 310 collide over Hendersonville, North Carolina, USA. Both aircraft are destroyed and all passengers and crew are killed, including John T. McNaughton, an advisor to Robert McNamara.
- 1969 – Chappaquiddick incident: U.S. Senator Ted Kennedy crashes his car into a tidal pond at Chappaquiddick Island, Massachusetts, killing his passenger Mary Jo Kopechne.
- 1972 – Dhofar Rebellion: British SAS units help the Omani government against Popular Front for the Liberation of Oman rebels in the Battle of Mirbat.
- 1976 – Sagarmatha National Park in Nepal is created.
- 1977 – The world's first Global Positioning System (GPS) signal is transmitted from Navigation Technology Satellite 2 (NTS-2) and received at Rockwell Collins in Cedar Rapids, Iowa, at 12:41 a.m. Eastern time (ET).
- 1979 – The Sandinista rebels overthrow the government of the Somoza family in Nicaragua.
- 1979 – The oil tanker SS Atlantic Empress collides with another oil tanker, causing the largest ever ship-borne oil spill.
- 1980 – Opening of the Summer Olympics in Moscow.
- 1981 – In a private meeting with U.S. President Ronald Reagan, French President François Mitterrand reveals the existence of the Farewell Dossier, a collection of documents showing the Soviet Union had been stealing American technological research and development.
- 1982 – In one of the first militant attacks by Hezbollah, David S. Dodge, president of the American University of Beirut, is kidnapped.
- 1983 – The first three-dimensional reconstruction of a human head in a CT is published.
- 1985 – The Val di Stava dam collapses, killing 268 people in Val di Stava, Italy.
- 1989 – United Airlines Flight 232 crashes in Sioux City, Iowa, killing 111.
- 1992 – A car bomb kills Judge Paolo Borsellino and five members of his escort.
- 1994 – Alas Chiricanas Flight 00901 is destroyed by a bomb after takeoff from Enrique Adolfo Jiménez Airport in Colón, Panama, killing 21.
- 1997 – The Troubles: The Provisional Irish Republican Army resumes a ceasefire to end their 25-year paramilitary campaign to end British rule in Northern Ireland.
- 2011 – Guinean President Alpha Condé survives an attempted assassination and coup d'état at his residence in Conakry.
- 2012 – Syrian civil war: The People's Protection Units (YPG) capture the city of Kobanî without resistance, starting the Rojava conflict in Northeast Syria.
- 2014 – Gunmen in Egypt's western desert province of New Valley Governorate attack a military checkpoint, killing at least 21 soldiers. Egypt reportedly declares a state of emergency on its border with Sudan.
- 2018 – The Knesset passes the controversial Nationality Bill, which defines the State of Israel as the nation-state of the Jewish people.
- 2024 ─ A faulty software update by CrowdStrike, an American cybersecurity company, causes global computer outages.
- 2024 ─ The International Court of Justice (ICJ) delivers a ruling stating that Israel should end its illegal occupation of the Palestinian territories. The ICJ identified that all member states of the UN are under an obligation not to recognize the occupation as legal nor "render aid or assistance" toward maintaining Israel's presence in the occupied territories.
- 2025 ─ The tourist boat Wonder Sea capsizes during a thunderstorm in Hạ Long Bay, Vietnam, leaving at least 36 people dead.
- 2026 ─ In East Rutherford, Spain defeat Argentina 1–0 after extra time to win their second FIFA World Cup title.

== Births ==
=== Pre-1600 ===
- 810 – Muhammad al-Bukhari, Persian scholar (died 870)
- 1223 – Baibars, sultan of Egypt (died 1277)
- 1420 – William VIII, Marquis of Montferrat (died 1483)
- 1569 – Conrad Vorstius, Dutch theologian (died 1622)

=== 1601–1900 ===
- 1670 – Richard Leveridge, English singer-songwriter (died 1758)
- 1688 – Giuseppe Castiglione, Italian missionary and painter (died 1766)
- 1744 – Heinrich Christian Boie, German author and poet (died 1806)
- 1759 – Marianna Auenbrugger, Austrian pianist and composer (died 1782)
- 1759 – Seraphim of Sarov, Russian monk and saint (died 1833)
- 1771 – Thomas Talbot, Irish-Canadian colonel and politician (died 1853)
- 1794 – José Justo Corro, Mexican politician and president (died 1864)
- 1789 – John Martin, English painter, engraver, and illustrator (died 1854)
- 1800 – Juan José Flores, Venezuelan general and politician, 1st President of Ecuador (died 1864)
- 1814 – Samuel Colt, American businessman, founded the Colt's Manufacturing Company (died 1862)
- 1819 – Gottfried Keller, Swiss author, poet, and playwright (died 1890)
- 1822 – Princess Augusta of Cambridge (died 1916)
- 1827 – Mangal Pandey, Indian soldier (died 1857)
- 1834 – Edgar Degas, French painter, sculptor, and illustrator (died 1917)
- 1835 – Justo Rufino Barrios, Guatemalan president (died 1885)
- 1842 – Frederic T. Greenhalge, English-American lawyer and politician, 38th Governor of Massachusetts (died 1896)
- 1846 – Edward Charles Pickering, American astronomer and physicist (died 1919)
- 1849 – Ferdinand Brunetière, French scholar and critic (died 1906)
- 1860 – Lizzie Borden, American woman, tried and acquitted for the murders of her father and step-mother in 1892 (died 1927)
- 1864 – Fiammetta Wilson, English astronomer (died 1920)
- 1865 – Georges Friedel, French mineralogist and crystallographer (died 1933)
- 1865 – Charles Horace Mayo, American surgeon, co-founder of the Mayo Clinic (died 1939)
- 1868 – Florence Foster Jenkins, American soprano and educator (died 1944)
- 1869 – Xenophon Stratigos, Greek general and politician, Greek Minister of Transport (died 1927)
- 1875 – Alice Dunbar Nelson, American poet and activist (died 1935)
- 1876 – Joseph Fielding Smith, American religious leader, 10th President of The Church of Jesus Christ of Latter-day Saints (died 1972)
- 1877 – Arthur Fielder, English cricketer (died 1949)
- 1881 – Friedrich Dessauer, German physicist and philosopher (died 1963)
- 1883 – Max Fleischer, Austrian-American animator and producer (died 1972)
- 1884 – Charles Edward, Duke of Saxe-Coburg and Gotha, British-born German nobleman and Nazi politician (died 1954)
- 1886 – Michael Fekete, Hungarian-Israeli mathematician and academic (died 1957)
- 1888 – Enno Lolling, German physician (died 1945)
- 1890 – George II of Greece (died 1947)
- 1891 – Earl Hamilton, American baseball player
- 1892 – Dick Irvin, Canadian ice hockey player and coach (died 1957)
- 1893 – Vladimir Mayakovsky, Russian actor, playwright, and poet (died 1930)
- 1894 – Aleksandr Khinchin, Russian mathematician and academic (died 1959)
- 1894 – Khawaja Nazimuddin, Bangladeshi-Pakistani politician, 2nd Prime Minister of Pakistan (died 1965)
- 1894 – Percy Spencer, American physicist and inventor of the microwave oven (died 1969)
- 1895 – Xu Beihong, Chinese painter and academic (died 1953)
- 1896 – Reginald Baker, English film producer (died 1985)
- 1896 – A. J. Cronin, Scottish physician and novelist (died 1981)
- 1896 – Bob Meusel, American baseball player and sailor (died 1977)
- 1898 – Herbert Marcuse, German-American sociologist and philosopher (died 1979)
- 1899 – Balai Chand Mukhopadhyay, Indian physician, author, poet, and playwright (died 1979)

=== 1901–present ===
- 1902 – Samudrala Sr., Indian singer, director, producer, and screenwriter (died 1968)
- 1904 – Robert Todd Lincoln Beckwith, American lawyer and farmer (died 1985)
- 1907 – Isabel Jewell, American actress (died 1972)
- 1908 – Daniel Fry, American contactee (died 1992)
- 1908 – Hans Trippel, German engineer, developed Amphicar (died 2001)
- 1909 – Balamani Amma, Indian poet and author (died 2004)
- 1912 – Peter Leo Gerety, American prelate (died 2016)
- 1913 – Kay Linaker, American actress and screenwriter (died 2008)
- 1914 – Marius Russo, American baseball player (died 2005)
- 1915 – Åke Hellman, Finnish painter (died 2017)
- 1916 – Phil Cavarretta, American baseball player and manager (died 2010)
- 1917 – William Scranton, American captain and politician, 13th United States Ambassador to the United Nations (died 2013)
- 1919 – Patricia Medina, English-American actress (died 2012)
- 1919 – Miltos Sachtouris, Greek poet and author (died 2005)
- 1919 – Ron Searle, English-Canadian soldier, publisher, and politician, 4th Mayor of Mississauga (died 2015)
- 1920 – Robert Mann, American violinist, composer, and conductor (died 2018)
- 1920 – Richard Oriani, Salvadoran-American metallurgist and engineer (died 2015)
- 1921 – Harold Camping, American evangelist, author, radio host (died 2013)
- 1921 – André Moynet, French soldier, race car driver, and politician (died 1993)
- 1921 – Elizabeth Spencer, American novelist, short story writer, and playwright (died 2019)
- 1921 – Rosalyn Sussman Yalow, American physicist and academic, Nobel Prize laureate (died 2011)
- 1922 – George McGovern, American lieutenant, historian, and politician (died 2012)
- 1922 – Rachel Robinson, American professor, registered nurse, and the widow of baseball player Jackie Robinson
- 1923 – Theo Barker, English historian (died 2001)
- 1923 – Alex Hannum, American basketball player and coach (died 2002)
- 1923 – Joseph Hansen, American author and poet (died 2004)
- 1923 – William A. Rusher, American lawyer and journalist (died 2011)
- 1923 – Lon Simmons, American baseball player and sportscaster (died 2015)
- 1924 – Stanley K. Hathaway, American soldier, lawyer, and politician, 40th United States Secretary of the Interior (died 2005)
- 1924 – Pat Hingle, American actor and producer (died 2009)
- 1924 – Arthur Rankin Jr., American director, producer, and screenwriter (died 2014)
- 1925 – Sue Thompson, American singer (died 2021)
- 1926 – Helen Gallagher, American actress, singer, and dancer (died 2024)
- 1928 – Samuel John Hazo, American author
- 1928 – Choi Yun-chil, South Korean long-distance runner and a two-time national champion in the marathon (died 2020)
- 1929 – Gaston Glock, Austrian engineer and businessman, co-founded Glock Ges.m.b.H. (died 2023)
- 1929 – Orville Turnquest, Bahamian politician
- 1930 – Elsie Vartanian, American politician and director of the United States Women's Bureau (died 2019)
- 1932 – Buster Benton, American singer-songwriter and guitarist (died 1996)
- 1932 – Jan Lindblad, Swedish biologist and photographer (died 1987)
- 1932 – Szilárd Keresztes, Hungarian Greek Catholic bishop (died 2025)
- 1934 – Francisco de Sá Carneiro, Portuguese lawyer and politician, 111th Prime Minister of Portugal (died 1980)
- 1935 – Nick Koback, American baseball player and golfer (died 2015)
- 1936 – David Colquhoun, English pharmacologist and academic
- 1937 – George Hamilton IV, American singer-songwriter and guitarist (died 2014)
- 1937 – Karen Dalton, American country blues and folk singer, guitarist, and banjo player (died 1993)
- 1937 – Richard Jordan, American actor (died 1993)
- 1938 – Jayant Narlikar, Indian astrophysicist and astronomer (died 2025)
- 1938 – Tom Raworth, English poet and academic (died 2017)
- 1941 – Vikki Carr, American singer and actress
- 1941 – Carole Jordan, British astrophysicist and the first female president of the Royal Astronomical Society
- 1941 – Neelie Kroes, Dutch politician and diplomat, European Commissioner for Digital Economy and Society
- 1943 – Han Sai Por, Singaporean sculptor and academic
- 1943 – Carla Mazzuca Poggiolini, Italian journalist and politician
- 1944 – Tim McIntire, American actor and singer (died 1986)
- 1944 – Andres Vooremaa, Estonian chess player (died 2022)
- 1945 – Paule Baillargeon, Canadian actress, director, and screenwriter
- 1945 – Edwin Schlossberg, American designer, author, and husband of Carolyn Kennedy
- 1946 – Alan Gorrie, Scottish singer-songwriter and musician
- 1946 – Ilie Năstase, Romanian tennis player and politician
- 1947 – André Forcier, Canadian director and screenwriter
- 1947 – Hans-Jürgen Kreische, German footballer and manager (died 2026)
- 1947 – Bernie Leadon, American guitarist and songwriter
- 1947 – Brian May, English singer-songwriter, guitarist, producer, and astrophysicist
- 1948 – Keith Godchaux, American keyboard player and songwriter (died 1980)
- 1949 – Kgalema Motlanthe, South African politician, 3rd President of South Africa
- 1950 – Per-Kristian Foss, Norwegian politician, Norwegian Minister of Finance
- 1950 – Freddy Moore, American singer-songwriter and guitarist (died 2022)
- 1950 – Adrian Noble, English director and screenwriter
- 1951 – Abel Ferrara, American director, producer, and screenwriter
- 1952 – Allen Collins, American guitarist and songwriter (died 1990)
- 1952 – Jayne Anne Phillips American novelist and short story writer
- 1953 – Howard Schultz, American businessman and author
- 1954 – Mark O'Donnell, American playwright (died 2012)
- 1954 – Steve O'Donnell, American screenwriter and producer
- 1954 – Srđa Trifković, Serbian-American journalist and historian
- 1954 – Alvan Adams, American basketball player
- 1955 – Roger Binny, Indian cricketer and sportscaster
- 1955 – Dalton McGuinty, Canadian lawyer and politician, 24th Premier of Ontario
- 1956 – Mark Crispin, American computer scientist, designed the IMAP (died 2012)
- 1958 – Brad Drewett, Australian tennis player and sportscaster (died 2013)
- 1958 – Robert Gibson, American wrestler
- 1958 – David Robertson, American conductor
- 1959 – Juan J. Campanella, Argentinian director, producer, and screenwriter
- 1960 – Atom Egoyan, Egyptian-Canadian director, producer, and screenwriter
- 1960 – Kevin Haskins, English drummer and songwriter
- 1961 – Harsha Bhogle, Indian journalist and author
- 1961 – Maria Filatova, Russian gymnast
- 1961 – Lisa Lampanelli, American comedian, actress, and author
- 1961 – Benoît Mariage, Belgian director and screenwriter
- 1961 – Hideo Nakata, Japanese director, producer, and screenwriter
- 1961 – Campbell Scott, American actor, director, and producer
- 1962 – Anthony Edwards, American actor and director
- 1962 – Craig Muni, Canadian ice hockey player
- 1963 – Thomas Gabriel Fischer, Swiss musician
- 1963 – Garth Nix, Australian author
- 1964 – Teresa Edwards, American basketball player
- 1964 – Masahiko Kondō, Japanese singer-songwriter and race car driver
- 1965 – Evelyn Glennie, Scottish musician
- 1965 – Claus-Dieter Wollitz, German footballer and manager
- 1965 – Stuart Scott, American sportscaster (died 2015)
- 1965 – Clea Lewis, American actress
- 1966 – David Segui, American baseball player
- 1967 – Yael Abecassis, Israeli model and actress
- 1967 – Jean-François Mercier, Canadian comedian, screenwriter, and television host
- 1968 – Robb Flynn, American singer-songwriter, guitarist, and producer
- 1968 – Pavel Kuka, Czech footballer and manager
- 1968 – Jim Norton, American comedian, actor, and author
- 1969 – Matthew Libatique, American cinematographer
- 1970 – Bill Chen, American poker player and software designer
- 1970 – Christopher Luxon, New Zealand politician, 42nd Prime Minister of New Zealand
- 1970 – Nicola Sturgeon, Scottish lawyer and politician, First Minister of Scotland
- 1971 – Rene Busch, Estonian tennis player and coach
- 1971 – Vitali Klitschko, Ukrainian boxer and politician, Mayor of Kyiv
- 1971 – Michael Modest, American wrestler
- 1971 – Catriona Rowntree, Australian television host
- 1971 – Lesroy Weekes, Montserratian cricketer
- 1972 – Ebbe Sand, Danish footballer and manager
- 1972 – Tully Bevilaqua, Australian basketball player
- 1973 – Martin Powell, English keyboard player and songwriter
- 1973 – Scott Walker, Canadian ice hockey player and coach
- 1974 – Rey Bucanero, Mexican wrestler
- 1974 – Francisco Copado, German footballer and manager
- 1974 – Josée Piché, Canadian ice dancer
- 1974 – Vince Spadea, American tennis player
- 1974 – Preston Wilson, American baseball player and sportscaster
- 1974 – Jason McGerr, American drummer
- 1975 – Luca Castellazzi, Italian footballer
- 1976 – Benedict Cumberbatch, English actor
- 1976 – Gonzalo de los Santos, Uruguayan footballer and manager
- 1976 – Vinessa Shaw, American actress
- 1977 – Jean-Sébastien Aubin, Canadian ice hockey player
- 1977 – Tony Mamaluke, American wrestler and manager
- 1977 – Ed Smith, English cricketer and journalist
- 1979 – Rick Ankiel, American baseball player
- 1979 – Josué Anunciado de Oliveira, Brazilian footballer
- 1979 – Dilhara Fernando, Sri Lankan cricketer
- 1979 – Luke Young, English footballer
- 1980 – Xavier Malisse, Belgian tennis player
- 1980 – Giorgio Mondini, Italian race car driver
- 1980 – Chris Sullivan, American actor
- 1981 – Nenê, Brazilian footballer
- 1981 – David Bernard, Jamaican cricketer
- 1981 – Mark Gasnier, Australian rugby player and sportscaster
- 1981 – Jimmy Gobble, American baseball player
- 1981 – Grégory Vignal, French footballer
- 1982 – Christopher Bear, American drummer
- 1982 – Phil Coke, American baseball player
- 1982 – Jared Padalecki, American actor
- 1982 – Jess Vanstrattan, Australian footballer
- 1983 – Helen Skelton, English television host and actress
- 1983 – Fedor Tyutin, Russian ice hockey player
- 1984 – Andrea Libman, Canadian voice actress
- 1984 – Adam Morrison, American basketball player
- 1984 – Ryan O'Byrne, Canadian ice hockey player
- 1984 – Lewis Price, Welsh footballer
- 1985 – LaMarcus Aldridge, American basketball player
- 1985 – Zhou Haibin, Chinese footballer
- 1985 – Marina Kuzina, Russian basketball player
- 1985 – Hadi Norouzi, Iranian footballer (died 2015)
- 1986 – Leandro Greco, Italian footballer
- 1986 – Jinder Mahal, Canadian wrestler
- 1987 – Yan Gomes, Brazilian-American baseball player
- 1987 – Jon Jones, American mixed martial artist
- 1987 – Marc Murphy, Australian footballer
- 1988 – Shane Dawson, American comedian and actor
- 1988 – Kevin Großkreutz, German footballer
- 1988 – Jakub Kovář, Czech ice hockey player
- 1988 – Cherami Leigh, American actress
- 1988 – Trent Williams, American football player
- 1989 – Patrick Corbin, American baseball player
- 1989 – Sam McKendry, Australian-New Zealand rugby league player
- 1989 – James Austin Johnson, American actor and comedian
- 1991 – Eray İşcan, Turkish footballer
- 1992 – Jake Nicholson, English footballer
- 1994 – Christian Welch, Australian rugby league player
- 1995 – Romee Strijd, Dutch model
- 1996 – Paul Momirovski, Australian rugby league player
- 1997 – Zach Werenski, American ice hockey player
- 1998 – Erin Cuthbert, Scottish footballer
- 1998 – Karl Jacobs, American YouTuber and streamer
- 1998 – Ronaldo Vieira, Bissau-Guinean footballer
- 1999 – Kim So-hye, South Korean actress and singer
- 2003 – Tyler Downs, American diver
- 2006 – Dani Muñoz, Spanish footballer

== Deaths ==
=== Pre-1600 ===
- 514 – Symmachus, pope of the Catholic Church
- 806 – Li Shigu, Chinese general (born 778)
- 973 – Kyunyeo, Korean monk and poet (born 917)
- 998 – Damian Dalassenos, Byzantine general (born 940)
- 1030 – Adalberon, French bishop
- 1234 – Floris IV, Dutch nobleman (born 1210)
- 1249 – Jacopo Tiepolo, doge of Venice
- 1333 – John Campbell, Scottish nobleman
- 1333 – Alexander Bruce, Scottish nobleman
- 1333 – Sir Archibald Douglas, Scottish nobleman
- 1333 – Maol Choluim II, Scottish nobleman
- 1333 – Kenneth de Moravia, 4th Earl of Sutherland
- 1374 – Petrarch, Italian poet and scholar (born 1304)
- 1415 – Philippa of Lancaster, Portuguese queen (born 1360)
- 1543 – Mary Boleyn, English daughter of Elizabeth Boleyn, Countess of Wiltshire (born 1499)

=== 1601–1900 ===
- 1631 – Cesare Cremonini, Italian philosopher and academic (born 1550)
- 1742 – William Somervile, English poet and author (born 1675)
- 1810 – Louise of Mecklenburg-Strelitz, Prussian queen (born 1776)
- 1814 – Matthew Flinders, English navigator and cartographer (born 1774)
- 1824 – Agustín de Iturbide, Mexican general and emperor (born 1783)
- 1838 – Pierre Louis Dulong, French physicist and chemist (born 1785)
- 1850 – Margaret Fuller, American journalist and critic (born 1810)
- 1855 – Konstantin Batyushkov, Russian poet and translator (born 1787)
- 1857 – Stefano Franscini, Swiss statistician and politician (born 1796)
- 1878 – Yegor Ivanovich Zolotarev, Russian mathematician and academic (born 1847)
- 1882 – John William Bean, English criminal and failed regicide (born 1824)
- 1896 – Abraham H. Cannon, American publisher and religious leader (born 1859)

=== 1901–present ===
- 1913 – Clímaco Calderón, Colombian lawyer and politician, 15th President of Colombia (born 1852)
- 1925 – John Indermaur, British lawyer (born 1851)
- 1930 – Robert Stout, Scottish-New Zealand politician, 13th Prime Minister of New Zealand (born 1844)
- 1933 – Kaarle Krohn, Finnish historian and academic (born 1863)
- 1939 – Rose Hartwick Thorpe, American poet and author (born 1850)
- 1941 – Špiro Bocarić, Serbian painter, victim of Genocide of Serbs
- 1943 – Yekaterina Budanova, Russian captain and pilot (born 1916)
- 1943 – Carlo Zangarini, Italian poet and opera librettist (born 1873)
- 1947 – U Razak, Burmese educator and politician (born 1898)
- 1947 – Aung San, Burmese general and politician (born 1915)
- 1947 – Lyuh Woon-hyung, South Korean politician (born 1886)
- 1963 – William Andrew, English priest (born 1884)
- 1965 – Syngman Rhee, South Korean journalist and politician, 1st President of South Korea (born 1875)
- 1967 – John T. McNaughton, United States Assistant Secretary of Defense for International Security Affairs and an advisor to Robert McNamara (born 1921)
- 1967 – Odell Shepard, American poet and politician, 66th Lieutenant Governor of Connecticut (born 1884)
- 1969 – Stratis Myrivilis, Greek soldier and author (born 1890)
- 1974 – Ernő Schwarz, Hungarian-American soccer player and coach (born 1904)
- 1975 – Lefty Frizzell, American singer-songwriter and guitarist (born 1928)
- 1975 – John Alan Coey, American mercenary and medic in the Rhodesian Bush War
- 1977 – Karl Ristikivi, Estonian geographer, author, and poet (born 1912)
- 1980 – Margaret Craven, American journalist and author (born 1901)
- 1980 – Nihat Erim, Turkish jurist and politician, 13th Prime Minister of Turkey (born 1912)
- 1980 – Hans Morgenthau, German-American political scientist, philosopher, and academic (born 1904)
- 1981 – Roger Doucet, Canadian tenor (born 1919)
- 1982 – Hugh Everett III, American physicist and mathematician (born 1930)
- 1984 – Faina Ranevskaya, Russian actress (born 1896)
- 1984 – Aziz Sami, Iraqi writer and translator (born 1895)
- 1985 – Janusz Zajdel, Polish author (born 1938)
- 1989 – Kazimierz Sabbat, Polish businessman and politician, President of the Republic of Poland (born 1913)
- 1990 – Eddie Quillan, American actor (born 1907)
- 1992 – Paolo Borsellino, Italian lawyer and judge (born 1940)
- 1994 – Victor Barbeau, Canadian author and academic (born 1896)
- 1998 – Elmer Valo, Polish-American baseball player, coach, and manager (born 1921)
- 2002 – Dave Carter, American singer-songwriter and guitarist (born 1952)
- 2002 – Alan Lomax, American historian, scholar, and activist (born 1915)
- 2003 – Bill Bright, American evangelist and author, founded the Campus Crusade for Christ (born 1921)
- 2003 – Pierre Graber, Swiss politician, President of the Swiss National Council (born 1908)
- 2004 – Sylvia Daoust, Canadian sculptor (born 1902)
- 2004 – J. Gordon Edwards, American entomologist, mountaineer, and DDT advocate (born 1919)
- 2004 – Francis A. Marzen, American priest and journalist (born 1924)
- 2004 – Zenkō Suzuki, Japanese politician, 70th Prime Minister of Japan (born 1911)
- 2005 – Edward Bunker, American author and screenwriter (born 1933)
- 2006 – Jack Warden, American actor (born 1920)
- 2007 – A. K. Faezul Huq, Bangladeshi journalist, lawyer, and politician (born 1945)
- 2007 – Roberto Fontanarrosa, Argentinian cartoonist (born 1944)
- 2008 – Dercy Gonçalves, Brazilian comedian and actress (born 1907)
- 2009 – Frank McCourt, American author and educator (born 1930)
- 2009 – Henry Surtees, English race car driver (born 1991)
- 2010 – Cécile Aubry, French actress, author, television screenwriter and director (born 1928)
- 2010 – Jon Cleary, Australian author and playwright (born 1917)
- 2012 – Humayun Ahmed, Bangladeshi director and playwright (born 1948)
- 2012 – Tom Davis, American comedian, actor, and screenwriter (born 1952)
- 2012 – Mohammad Hassan Ganji, Iranian meteorologist and academic (born 1912)
- 2012 – Omar Suleiman, Egyptian general and politician, 16th Vice President of Egypt (born 1935)
- 2012 – Sylvia Woods, American businesswoman, co-founded Sylvia's Restaurant of Harlem (born 1926)
- 2012 – Valiulla Yakupov, Islamic cleric (born 1963)
- 2013 – Mikhail Gorsheniov, Russian singer-songwriter (born 1973)
- 2013 – Geeto Mongol, Canadian-American wrestler and trainer (born 1931)
- 2013 – Mel Smith, English actor, director, and screenwriter (born 1952)
- 2013 – Bert Trautmann, German footballer and manager (born 1923)
- 2013 – Phil Woosnam, Welsh-American soccer player and manager (born 1932)
- 2013 – Peter Ziegler, Swiss geologist and academic (born 1928)
- 2013 – Leyla Erbil, Turkish author (born 1931)
- 2014 – Rubem Alves, Brazilian theologian (born 1933)
- 2014 – Skye McCole Bartusiak, American child actress and child model (born 1992)
- 2014 – David Easton, Canadian-American political scientist and academic (born 1917)
- 2014 – Paul M. Fleiss, American pediatrician and author (born 1933)
- 2014 – James Garner, American actor (born 1928)
- 2014 – Jerzy Jurka, Polish biologist (born 1950)
- 2014 – Ray King, English footballer and manager (born 1924)
- 2014 – Ingemar Odlander, Swedish journalist (born 1936)
- 2014 – Harry Pougher, English cricketer (born 1941)
- 2014 – Leen Vleggeert, Dutch politician (born 1931)
- 2014 – John Winkin, American baseball player, coach, and journalist (born 1919)
- 2015 – Van Alexander, American composer and conductor (born 1915)
- 2015 – Galina Prozumenshchikova, Ukrainian-Russian swimmer and journalist (born 1948)
- 2015 – Carmino Ravosa, American singer-songwriter, pianist, and producer (born 1930)
- 2015 – Gennadiy Seleznyov, Russian journalist and politician, 2nd Speaker of the Duma (born 1947)
- 2016 – Garry Marshall, American actor, director, and producer (born 1934)
- 2018 – Jon Schnepp, American producer, director, voice actor, editor, writer, cartoonist, animator, and cinematographer (born 1967)
- 2018 – Denis Ten, Kazakhstani figure skater (born 1993)
- 2019 – Rutger Hauer, Dutch actor, director, and producer (born 1944)
- 2024 – Toumani Diabaté, Malian musician (born 1965)
- 2024 – Iryna Farion, Ukrainian linguist and politician (born 1964)
- 2024 – Kevan Gosper, Australian athlete and administrator (born 1933)
- 2024 – Sheila Jackson Lee, American lawyer and politician (born 1950)
- 2024 – Nguyễn Phú Trọng, Vietnamese politician, General Secretary of the Communist Party of Vietnam (born 1944)
- 2024 – Ray Reardon, Welsh snooker player and police officer (born 1932)
- 2024 – James C. Scott, American political scientist and anthropologist (born 1936)
- 2024 – Esta TerBlanche, South African actress (born 1973)

== Holidays and observances ==
- Palace Day
- Christian feast day:
  - Aurea of Córdoba
  - Bernold, Bishop of Utrecht
  - John Plessington
  - Justa and Rufina
  - Kirdjun (or Abakerazum)
  - Macrina the Younger, Sister of St. Basil the Great
  - Symmachus
  - July 19 (Eastern Orthodox liturgics)
- Martyrs' Day (Myanmar)
- Sandinista Day or Liberation Day (Nicaragua)
