= Verkh-Zhilino =

Verkh-Zhilino Верх-Жилино
- Village
- Location within Altai Krai Location within Russia
- Coordinates: 53°29′N 84°38′E
- Country: Russia
- Region: Altai Krai
- District: Kosikhinsky District
- Time zone: UTC+7:00

Verkh-Zhilino (Russian: Верх-Жилино) is a rural locality (a selo) and the administrative center of Verkh-Zhilino Selsoviet of Kosikhinsky District, Altai Krai, Russia. The population was 410 as of 2016. There are 13 streets.

== Geography ==
Verkh-Zhilino is located on the Zhilikha River, 17 km north of Kosikha (the district's administrative centre) by road. Kosikha is the nearest rural locality.
