= Ouderkerk (disambiguation) =

Ouderkerk (older Dutch: Ouwerkerk, English: Overkirk) may refer to:

- Ouderkerk, a former municipality in South Holland, Netherlands
  - Ouderkerk aan den IJssel, a town in that former municipality
- Ouderkerk aan de Amstel, a town in North Holland, Netherlands
- Ouwerkerk, a town in Zeeland, Netherlands
- Coco “Colourbee” Ouwerkerk, a cartoonist and creator of Acception
- Henry de Nassau, Lord Overkirk (1640–1708), Dutch general and lord of Ouderkerk aan den IJssel
