= Robert Rozhdestvensky =

Russian poet (1932–1994)

- Роберт Рождественский
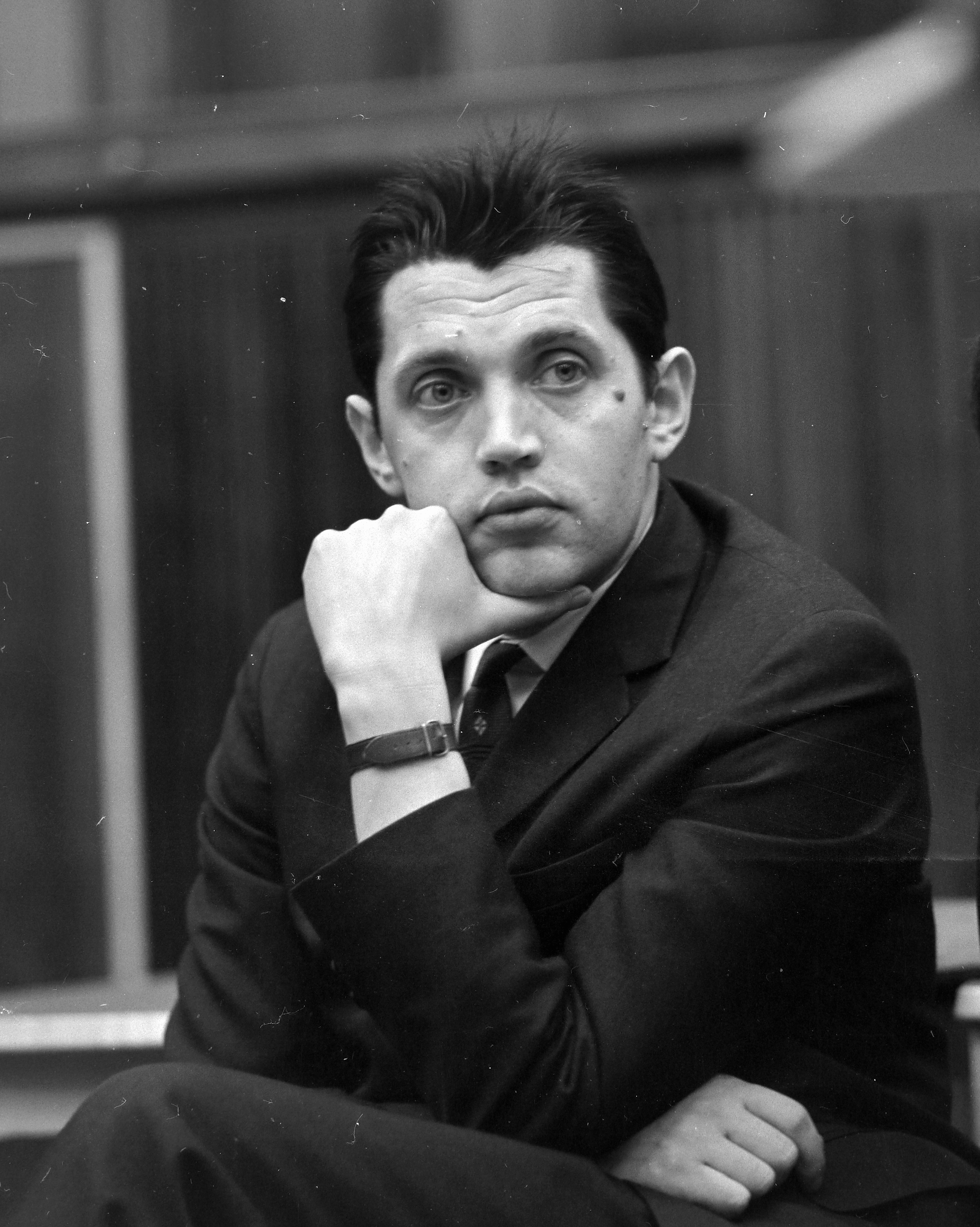
- Rozhdestvensky in 1965
- Born: Robert Stanislavovich Petkevich; 20 June 1932; Kosikha, West Siberian Krai, Russian SFSR, Soviet Union
- Died: 19 August 1994 (aged 62); Moscow, Russia
- Resting place: Peredelkino Cemetery
- Education: Petrozavodsk State University; Maxim Gorky Literature Institute
- Occupations: Poet, translator, songwriter
- Spouse: Alla Borisovna Kireyeva (Russian: Алла Борисовна Киреева 1933–2015)
- Writing career
- Language: Russian
- Years active: 1950–1994
- Genre: Lyrical poetry
- Notable works: Flags of Spring (Флаги весны), 1955 "Documentary Screen"(Документальный экран) 1974
- Literary movement: Sixtiers

Robert Ivanovich Rozhdestvensky (Russian: Ро́берт Ива́нович Рожде́ственский; 20 June 1932 – 19 August 1994) was a Soviet-Russian poet and songwriter who broke with socialist realism in the 1950s–1960s during the Khrushchev Thaw and, along with such poets as Andrei Voznesensky, Yevgeny Yevtushenko, and Bella Akhmadulina, pioneered a newer, fresher, and freer style of poetry in the Soviet Union.

== Early life ==
Robert Rozhdestvensky was born in the village of Kosikha in West Siberian Krai (now Altai Krai). He was named in honor of Robert Eikhe.

His father, Stanislav Nikodimovich Petkevich, was a Polish man employed by the OGPU, NKVD until drafted in 1941. Whilst in the army he obtained the rank of lieutenant overseeing his own group in the 123rd Rifle Division(ru)

He died in battle in Latvia on February 22, 1945. He was buried near the village of Mashen in the Temerovo district of the Latvian SSR, He was later reburied in a mass grave in the village of Slampe in the Tukums Municipality.

His birth parents divorced when Rozhdestvensky was 5 years old.

His mother, Vera Pavlovna Fedorova (1913-2001), was the director of a rural elementary school and was studying medicine at a specialised institute.

From 1932-1934 he lived in the Sherbakulsky District, Omsk Oblast. His grandfather P.D. Fedorov is buried in a cemetery here.

After 1934 Rozhdestvensky lived with his parents and grandmother in Omsk. Following the outbreak of World War II his parents were called to the front. Rozhdestvensky was left with his grandmother Nadezhda Alekseyevna Fyodorova.

Rozhdestvensky's first poem "My dad goes camping with a rifle"..." (С винтовкой мой папа уходит в поход) was published in The Omsk Truth (Омская правда) July 8, 1941)

In 1943 he studied at the military music school. His grandmother died in April 1943, His mother returned briefly to register her sister in the apartment. Rozhdestvensky continued to live there with his aunt and cousin until 1944.

His mother attempted to bring him with her to become a "Son of the Regiment(ru)" a child living in the army.

On the way to Moscow he changed his mind and found himself in the Danilovsky Orphanage.

In 1945, his mother remarried. Her new husband was an officer named Ivan Ivanovich Rozhdestvensky (1899-1976). Robert changed his name and patronymic to that of his new stepfather. His parents took him to Königsberg, where they were both serving at the time.

After the war ended he moved to Leningrad until 1948 where he moved again to Petrozavodsk.

== Career ==
In 1950, the first adult publication of Rozhdestvensky's poems appeared in the magazine At the Frontier(ru).

Rozhdestvensky attempted to enter the Maxim Gorky Literature Institute in the same year but wasn't accepted. He spent the following year studying at the historical and philological departments at Petrozavodsk State University.

In 1951, after reapplying he was able to attend the Maxim Gorky Literature Institute.

During his studies at the institute, he published the collections of poems Flags of Spring (1955) and Test (1956), and published the poem "My Love" (1955). He also became a member of the Union of Soviet Writers during this time.

During the following period until 1964 Rozhdestvensky and his contemporaries became known for the transgressive mildly anti-Soviet work which they would perform in front of live audiences in stadiums.

In 1955, while practicing in Altai, Rozhdestvensky met with a student at the conservatory, Alexander Flyarkovsky, with whom he created his first song - "Your Window".

In 1956, he met classmate Alla Kireyeva. future literary critic, artist and wife.

After graduation in 1956 he moved to Moscow. It was there he would meet Yevgeny Yevtushenko and later Bulat Okudzhava and Andrei Voznesensky.

In 1957 he fathered his first daughter Russian Photographer Yekaterina Rozhdestvenskaya(ru).

On March 7, 1963, he participated in a meeting with Khrushchev and the intelligentsia, and was vilified for the poem "Yes, Boys." "Khrushchev cried out in a fury:" Comrade Rozhdestvensky, it's time for you to stand under the banners of your fathers! "A punishment followed, many tried to forget about Rozhdestvensky. They didn’t publish him, they didn’t invite him to meetings ... Then, for some reason, Kapitonov, secretary of the CPSU Central Committee, didn’t like the poem "Morning", as a result Robert was forced to leave Moscow for Kyrgyzstan altogether. He worked there, translating the poems of local poets into Russian ... "

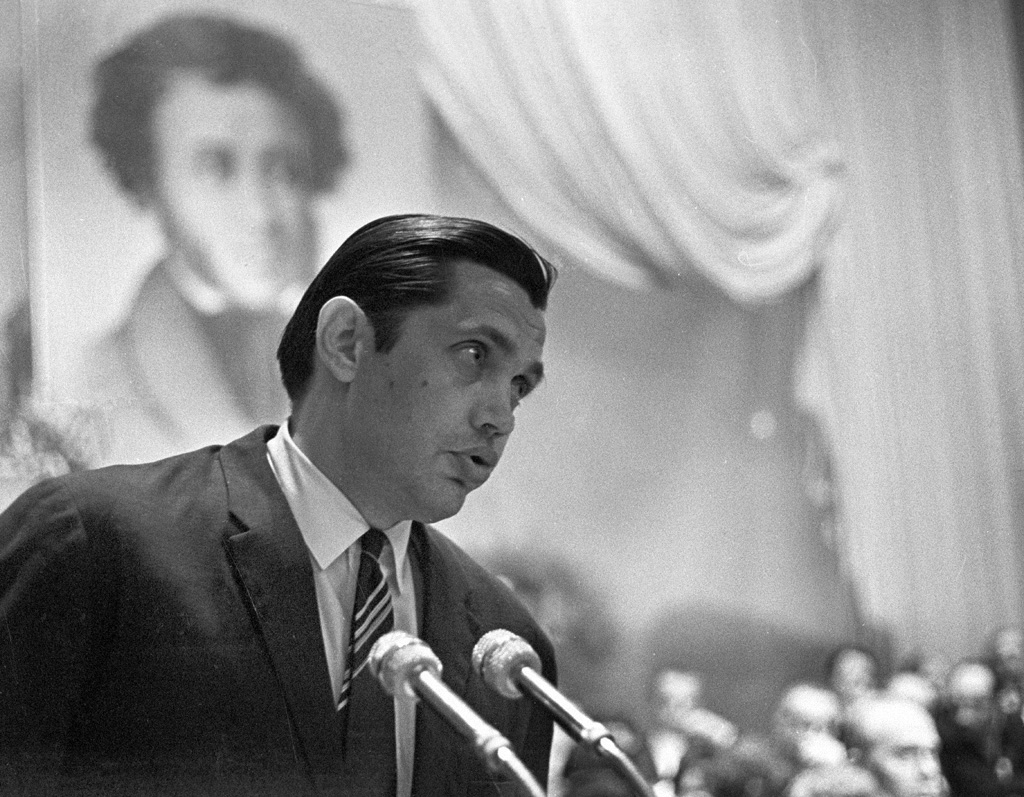
Rozhdestvensky speaking at the 3rd All-Union Celebration of the poetry of Alexander Pushkin at the Pushkin Academic Drama Theatre(ru) in Pskov, 1969

In 1966, Rozhdestvensky was the first to receive the Golden Wreath from the Struga Poetry Evenings.

In 1968, he co-wrote a song "Ogromnoe nebo".

In the 1970s, Rozhdestvensky was the host of the Documentary Screen(ru)(Ru: Документальный экран) television show which aired on Soviet Central Television. It presented documentary stories discussing various often topics including the west and was often marred by state propaganda

Rozhdestvensky appeared at the Cannes Film Festival as a member of the jury. He first appeared at the festival in 1968, he returned in 1973 and supported La Grande Bouffe and its director Marco Ferreri, his final visit was in 1979 where he persuaded Françoise Sagan to give the prize to Andrei Konchalovsky's Siberiade.

Since 1976, he was the Secretary of the Union of Soviet Writers.

He became a member of Communist Party of the Soviet Union in 1977.

In 1980, the Olympic anthem in Russian was sounded at the opening ceremony of the Olympic Games in Moscow. Rozhdestvensky provided the translation.

In 1979, he was awarded the USSR State Prize for the poem "210 Steps".

From 1986 - Chairman of the Commission on the Literary Heritage of Osip Mandelstam. He took a direct role in the rehabilitation of Mandelstam. As the Chairman of the Commission on Literary Heritage of Marina Tsvetaeva he helped the opening of the Maria Tsvetaeva House-Museum(ru). As Chairman of the Commission on Literary Heritage Vladimir Vysotsky, he compiled the first published book of poems "Nerve" by Vysotsky in the USSR " Nerve " (1981).

== Illness and death ==
In early 1990, Rozhdestvensky was diagnosed with a brain tumor. The poet responded to this misfortune with sarcasm: "In my brain there is a tumor the size of a chicken egg, - (I wonder who it brought out a chicken carrying such eggs?! .. )." As a result of a successful operation in France, Rozhdestvensky survived and continued to create until his death.

In October 1993, he signed the Letter of Forty-Two. However, Eduard Shevelev contends that his signature (like poet Mikhail Dudin) was forged.

Rozhdestvensky died of a heart attack on 19 August 1994 in Peredelkino.

He was buried at the Peredelkino cemetery. In the same year, the collection "The Last Poems of Robert Rozhdestvensky" was published in Moscow.

Grave of Rozhdestvensky in Peredelkino Cemetery taken by Russian Wiki User Bogdanov-62

== Awards and honors ==
- 1966 Golden Wreath Winner, Struga Poetry Evenings
- 1970 Moscow Komsomol Prize
- 1972 Lenin Komsomol Prize
- 1979 U.S.S.R State Prize
- 1984 Golden Calf Award(ru) Club of 12 Chairs(ru), Literaturnaya Gazeta

== Works ==
- Flags of Spring (Флаги весны), 1955
- To My Contemporary (Ровеснику), 1962
- Dedication (Посвящение), 1970
- In Twenty Years (За двадцать лет), 1973
- Insomnia (Бессонница), 1991
- Alyoshka's Thoughts (Алёшкины мысли), poems for children, 1991
- Last poems of Robert Rozhdestvensky was published after his death.
