= Kosik =

Kosik can refer to:

- Kosik (elephant), an Indian elephant popular imitating Korean words
- Košík, village and municipality of Czech Republic

== People ==
- Edwin Michael Kosik, American judge
- Karel Kosík, Czech philosopher
- Rafał Kosik, Polish writer

== See also ==
- Košíky, another Czech village and municipality
- Kosika or kashaka, a percussion instrument from West Africa
- Kosikha, several localities in Russia
