= Malakhovo, Kosikhinsky District, Altai Krai =

Malakhovo Малахово
- Selo
- Location within Altai Krai Location within Russia
- Coordinates: 53°21′N 84°24′E
- Country: Russia
- Region: Altai Krai
- District: Kosikhinsky District
- Time zone: UTC+7:00

Malakhovo (Russian: Малахово) is a rural locality (a selo) and the administrative center of Malakhovsky Selsoviet, Kosikhinsky District, Altai Krai, Russia. The population was 750 as of 2013. There are 16 streets.

== Geography ==
Malakhovo is located 33 km west of Kosikha (the district's administrative centre) by road. Voskhod is the nearest rural locality.
