= Gherman Titov =

Soviet cosmonaut (1935–2000)

- Герман Титов
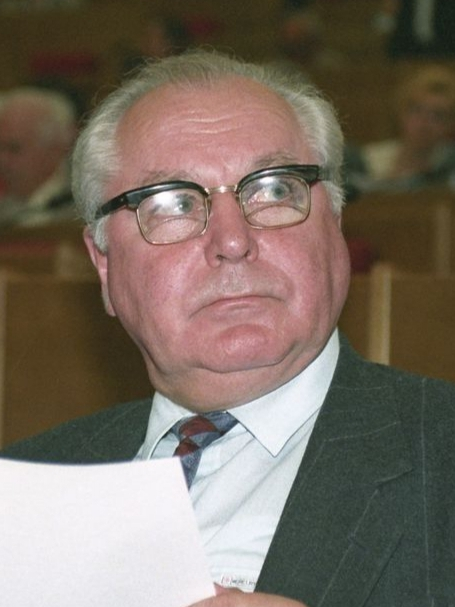
- Titov in 1995
- Born: Gherman Stepanovich Titov; 11 September 1935; Verkhneye Zhilino, West Siberian Krai, Russian SFSR, Soviet Union
- Died: 20 September 2000 (aged 65); Moscow, Russia
- Resting place: Novodevichy Cemetery, Moscow
- Citizenship: Soviet (until 1991); Russian (1991–2000)
- Occupation: Pilot
- Awards: Hero of the Soviet Union
- Space career

Cosmonaut
- Rank: General-Colonel, Soviet Air Force
- Time in space: 1d 01h 18m
- Selection: Air Force Group 1
- Missions: Vostok 2

Gherman (Note: Also transliterated as German.) Stepanovich Titov (Russian: Герман Степанович Титов; 11 September 1935 – 20 September 2000) was a Soviet and Russian cosmonaut who, on 6 August 1961, became the second human to orbit the Earth, aboard Vostok 2, preceded by Yuri Gagarin on Vostok 1. He was the fourth person in space, counting suborbital voyages of US astronauts Alan Shepard and Gus Grissom. Born in Altai Krai in western Siberia, Titov was the first spacefarer born in Asia. At 25 years old at launch, he remains the youngest professional astronaut and the youngest person to fly in Earth orbit. (Note: Oliver Daemen flew on the sub-orbital Blue Origin NS-16 at the age of 18 in 2021.)

Titov's flight proved that humans could live and work in space. He was the first person to orbit the Earth multiple times (a total of 17 orbits) and to spend more than a day in space. He was also the first to sleep in orbit and to suffer from space sickness (becoming the first person to vomit in space). Titov captured the first photos of Earth from space taken by a human. He also was the first spacefarer to film the Earth, using a professional Konvas-Avtomat movie camera for ten minutes.

Titov continued to work for the Soviet space program. Under the Spiral program, he trained to become the first pilot of an orbital spaceplane. However, after the death of Yuri Gagarin in a fighter jet crash in 1968, the Soviet government decided it could not afford to lose its second cosmonaut, and so Titov's career as test pilot ended.

Titov served in the Soviet Air Force, attaining the rank of colonel-general. Retiring in 1992, he became a politician of the Communist Party of the Russian Federation, and was elected to the State Duma in 1995. Despite having been chosen second, after Gagarin, to fly into space, it was Titov who later proposed the Soviet Government regularly celebrate Cosmonautics Day on April 12, the day of Gagarin's flight.

== Biography ==
Titov was born in the village of Verkhneye Zhilino in the Altai Krai and went to school at the Stalingrad Military Aviation School. After graduating as an air force pilot, he was selected for cosmonaut training in 1960.

He flew the Vostok 2 mission launched on 6 August 1961. It lasted for 25.3 hours and he performed 17 orbits of the Earth. His call sign was Eagle (Russian: Орёл). He landed close to the town of Krasny Kut in Saratov Oblast, Russia. A month short of 26 years old at launch, he is the youngest professional astronaut and person to fly to Earth orbit, and remained the youngest person to fly in space until July 2021, when his record was surpassed by a Dutch teenager, Oliver Daemen. Titov was a member of the Communist Party of the Soviet Union, as were almost all the Soviet cosmonauts.

Titov was a fine sportsman, and keen on gymnastics:

Service in the Air Force made us strong, both physically and morally. All of us cosmonauts took up sports and PT seriously when we served in the Air Force. I know that Yuri Gagarin was fond of ice hockey. He liked to play goal keeper. Gherman Titov was a gymnastics enthusiast, Andriyan Nikolayev liked skiing, Pavel Popovich went in for weight lifting. I don't think I am wrong when I say that sports became a fixture in the life of the cosmonauts.

— Valery Bykovsky

He was the first person to suffer from space sickness (motion sickness in space) and was also the first person to sleep in space. He slept for roughly one orbit and was surprised to wake with his arms floating in the air because of the absence of normal gravity. He returned to sleep after he had his arms under a security belt and slept 30 minutes more than predicted by the flight plan. He stated, "Once you have your arms and legs arranged properly, space sleep is fine.... I slept like a baby".

Titov was the first photographer in space, when he took this picture of Earth.

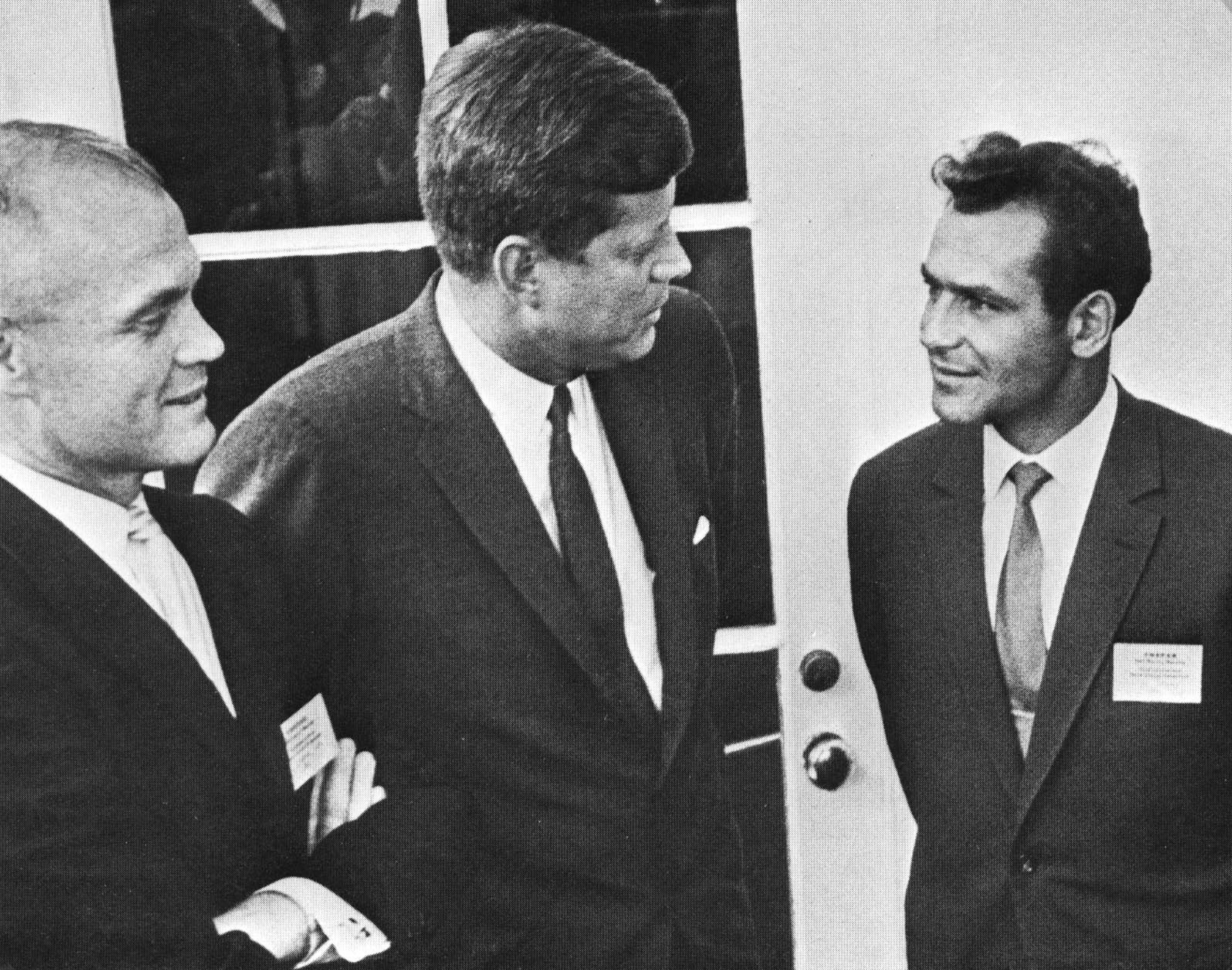
Titov (right) appears with U.S. President John F. Kennedy and American astronaut John Glenn, 1962

Though he had been suffering from space sickness during his orbit, Titov celebrated upon landing. His celebration is described as "a fit of euphoria" after landing, and on his return flight to Kubishev for debriefing, he alarmed the medical staff by opening and downing a beer, in complete violation of the rules.

After landing, Titov was sent to hospital for further testing to ensure that he was not sick. After his mission, he reportedly engaged in behaviours that could be considered unacceptable for someone working within the space programme. He is reported to have been enthralled in his love of women, excessive drinking, and fast cars, which caused some to theorise that his behaviour had potentially been another side effect of the space sickness he experienced from zero gravity. Further testing revealed that not to be the case.

During a widely-publicised 1962 visit to Seattle to tour the Century 21 World's Fair, Titov was asked by reporters how his space flight affected his philosophy of life. He replied: "Sometimes people are saying that God is out there. I was looking around attentively all day but I didn't find anybody there. I saw neither angels nor God". The utterance was used in Soviet anti-religion propaganda, but it was misattributed to Yuri Gagarin.

Following his space flight, Titov assumed various senior positions in the Soviet space programme until his retirement in 1992. In 1995, he was elected to the State Duma as a member of the Communist Party of the Russian Federation.

On 20 September 2000, he died of cardiac arrest in his sauna at the age of 65 in Moscow. He was buried in the Novodevichy Cemetery.

== Awards and legacy ==
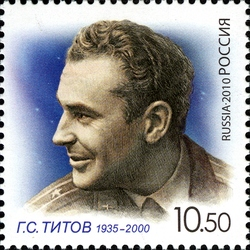
Titov on a Russian stamp

Gherman Titov was awarded the title Hero of the Soviet Union, two Orders of Lenin, and numerous medals and foreign orders. He was bestowed the title of the Hero of Socialist Labor of Bulgaria, Hero of Labour of Viet Nam and Hero of Mongolia. He is the namesake for a crater on the far side of the Moon and an island in Ha Long Bay.

On 6 August 2011, the 50th anniversary of Titov's flight, the reconstructed and expanded Gherman Titov Museum was opened in his native village of Polkovnikovo, Altai Krai.

The Titov Space Centre is named after him.

== Cultural references ==
In Arthur C. Clarke's 1982 book, 2010: Odyssey Two (and the 1984 film adaptation 2010), the opening scene features a conversation between Dimitri Moisevitch of the Soviet Space Council and Dr. Heywood Floyd. When Moisevitch informs Floyd that the Soviets will be travelling to Jupiter on their new spaceship the Cosmonaut Alexei Leonov, Floyd is puzzled, expecting that the ship was to be named after Gherman Titov. In the book, Moisevitch just mentions that it has been changed to Leonov; in the film, he comments without elaboration that Titov has fallen out of favour.

BBC Radio 4's Afternoon Play on 12 April 2011, Titanium, features Titov as narrator during the training and flight of Yuri Gagarin. It was part of a week to celebrate the 50th anniversary of Gagarin's flight.

== Honours and awards ==
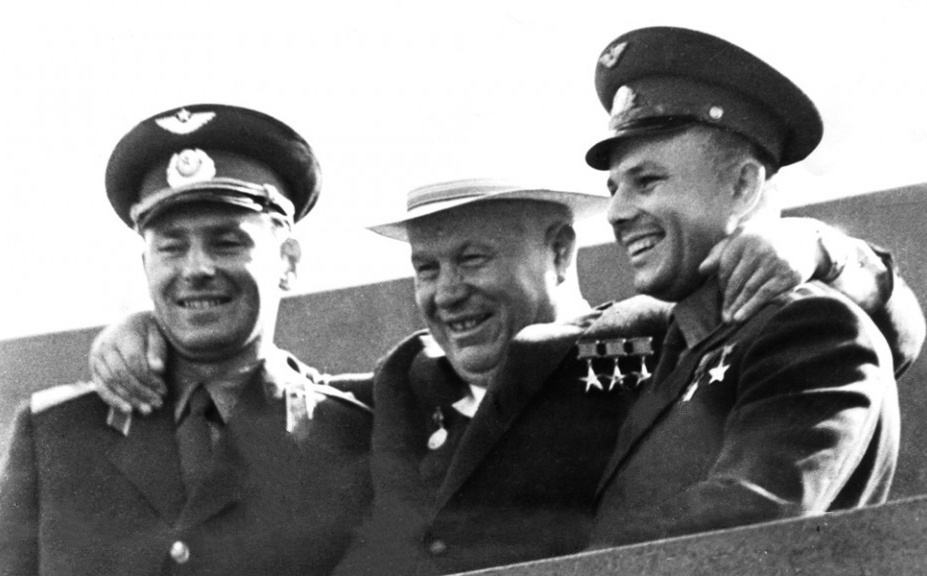
Titov, Nikita Khrushchev and Yuri Gagarin at Red Square in Moscow, 9 August 1961

Russia and the USSR

- Hero of the Soviet Union № 11158 (9 August 1961)
- Order of Merit for the Fatherland, 3rd Class (7 September 1995) – for services to the state, achievements in work and significant contribution to strengthening friendship and cooperation between peoples
- Two Orders of Lenin (17 June and 9 August 1961)
- Order of the October Revolution (21 February 1985)
- Order of the Red Banner of Labour (15 January 1976)
- Lenin Prize (1988)
- Medal "For the Development of Virgin Lands" (August 1961)
- Honoured specialist of the Armed Forces of the USSR (15 August 1991) – for outstanding service to the Soviet state in the country's defence capacity and professional skill
- Honoured Master of Sports (1961)
- Pilot-cosmonaut of the Soviet Union (9 August 1961)
- Honorary Citizen of Barnaul

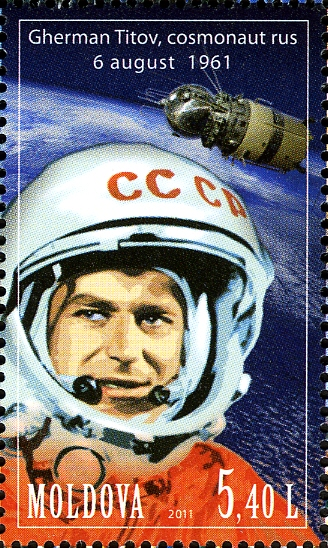
Titov on a Moldovan stamp

=== Foreign awards ===
- Hero of Labour of the Democratic Republic of Vietnam (21 January 1962)
- Order of Ho Chi Minh (Vietnam)
- Friendship Order (Vietnam)
- Hero of Socialist Labour of the People's Republic of Bulgaria (27 September 1962)
- Order of Georgi Dimitrov (Bulgaria, 27 September 1962).
- Medal "25 Years of People's Power" (Bulgaria)
- Medal "100th Anniversary of the Birth of Georgi Dimitrov" (Bulgaria, 14 February 1983)
- Hero of the Mongolian People's Republic (10 December 1961)
- Order of Sukhbaatar (Mongolia, 10 December 1961)
- Medal "30 Years of Victory over Japan's militarist" (Mongolia, 8 January 1976)
- Order of Karl Marx (East Germany, 1 September 1961)
- Gold Medal "for exemplary work" (East Germany, 4 September 1961)
- Star of the Republic of Indonesia, 2nd Class (9 January 1962)
- Order of the Yugoslav Star with sash (19 September 1962)
- Order of the Star of Romania, 1st Class (14 October 1961)
- Order of the Star of the Republic of the Congo (Congo, 1965)
- Order of Friendship and Cooperation (Syria, 1988)
- Honour of the President of Ukraine (11 April 1995) – for outstanding contributions to the development of space rocket systems, the strengthening of international cooperation in space industry and in conjunction with the 10th anniversary of the first flight of the launch vehicle Zenit

== See also ==
- List of members of the State Duma of Russia who died in office
