= Vannier =

Vannier is the French word for a basket-maker.

== People ==
- Jean-Claude Vannier (b. 1943), a French musician, composer and arranger
- Michael W. Vannier (b. 1949), an American radiologist in Chicago
- Paul Vannier (b. 1985), French politician
- Philippe Vannier (1762–1842), a French Navy officer and an adventurer
