= Vladimir Menshikov (artist) =

Menshikov Vladimir Mikhailovich
- Born: 3 January 1933; Leningrad, Leningrad Oblast, RSFSR, Soviet Union
- Died: 1994 (aged 60–61)
- Education: V. I. Mukhina Higher Art School (now called Saint Petersburg Stieglitz State Academy of Art and Design)
- Notable work: 'There is no God!', '1945'
- Style: Soviet art, caricature

Vladimir Menshikov (1933–1994) was a Soviet woodcutter and painter based in Leningrad (now Saint Petersburg). He graduated from V. I. Mukhina Higher Art School in 1957, and the year after joined Boevoy Karandash collective. He drew Soviet propaganda posters, most famously 'There is no God!' and '1945'. He worked with the publishing houses Khudozhestvennaya Literatura, Artist of the RSFSR, Leninizdat, and others. He drew his last artwork in 1993, before dying in 1994.
