= Les Martyrs d'Égypte =

Les Martyrs d'Égypte is a work by Hippolyte Delehaye, included in Analecta Bollandiana #40. It contains references to several saints, including:

- Abadiu of Antinoe
- Abāmūn of Tarnūt
- Kirdjun.

== Sources ==
- Holweck, F. G. A Biographical Dictionary of the Saint. St. Louis, MO: B. Herder Book Co. 1924.
