= Leen Vleggeert =

Dutch politician

Member of the Senate
- In office 10 June 1981 – 13 September 1983

Personal details
- Born: 31 January 1931 Gouderak, Netherlands
- Died: 19 July 2014 (aged 83) Waddinxveen, Netherlands
- Party: Labour Party

Leendert "Leen" Vleggeert (31 January 1931 – 19 July 2014) was a Dutch politician. He served as a member of the Senate of the Netherlands between 1981 and 1983 for the Labour Party. He was also mayor of Puttershoek (1977–1982), interim-mayor of Heinenoord (1980–1982), mayor of Gorinchem (1982–1990), Spijkenisse (1990–1996) and lastly interim-mayor of Vlaardingen (2002).

Vleggeert was born in Gouderak, where his father served in the municipal council. Between 1946 and 1977 he worked in the metal industry. In the industry he worked his way up from metalworker to manager. In his political views Vleggeert was a supporter of Joop den Uyl. He was made Officer in the Order of Orange-Nassau on 27 April 1990. He died on 19 July 2014 in Waddinxveen.
