= Abadiu of Antinoe =

Bishop of Antinoe, martyr and saint of the Coptic Church

Saint Abadiu

Bishop of Antinoe
- Born: c. Fourth Century; Egypt
- Died: c. Fourth Century; Egypt
- Venerated in: Catholic Church; Eastern Orthodox Church; Oriental Orthodoxy
- Feast: 26 December

Abadiu of Antinoe was a bishop of Antinoe (part of modern-day Egypt) in the Fourth Century. He is commemorated as a saint in the Coptic Orthodox Church, and is said to have been killed in a theological dispute with the Arians. His feast day is 26 December. He is referenced in Les Martyrs d'Égypte by Hippolyte Delehaye.

== Sources ==
- Holweck, F. G. A Biographical Dictionary of the Saint. St. Louis, MO: B. Herder Book Co. 1924.
