= Capsizing of the Wonder Sea =

2025 boat sinking in Hạ Long Bay, Vietnam

- Date: 19 July 2025
- Time: 13:30 ICT (UTC+7)
- Location: Hạ Long Bay, Vietnam; 20.8733°N 107.0750°E
- Cause: Undetermined; ascribed to thunderstorm
- Deaths: 39
- Injuries: 10

On 19 July 2025, the tourist boat Wonder Sea capsized due to high winds during an abrupt thunderstorm in Hạ Long Bay, Vietnam, killing 39 people, while 10 people were rescued with non-fatal injuries. The incident took place during a tour, and a rescue operation began after contact with the ship was lost. It was reported as the deadliest naval accident in Vietnam in over 20 years.

== Background ==
The Wonder Sea, also known as Vịnh Xanh 58 (Vietnamese pronunciation: [vɨŋ˧˨ʔ sajŋ̟˧˧ nam˧˧ mɨəj˨˩ taːm˧˦]; lit. 'Blue Bay 58') is a 24-metre (79-foot) inland waterway vessel specializing in tourism services in Hạ Long Bay, Quảng Ninh province, Vietnam. It was officially registered by the Quảng Ninh Department of Transport on 21 May 2015.

According to regulations, the vessel was permitted to carry a maximum of 48 passengers. It was issued a Certificate of Technical Safety and Environmental Protection by the Quảng Ninh Inland Waterway Registration Station, with the most recent inspection conducted on 10 January 2025.

== Incident ==
At approximately 12:55 ICT (UTC+7) on 19 July 2025, the Wonder Sea, with registration number QN-7105, set off on a sightseeing tour in Hạ Long Bay, carrying 46 passengers and 3 crew members. According to the planned itinerary, captain and owner Đoàn Văn Trình was to take the passengers to several prominent landmarks in the bay, including Chó Đá Islet, Đỉnh Huơng Islet, Gà Chọi Islet, Sửng Sốt Cave, Luồn Cave and Ti Tốp Island. The standard duration of the tour is approximately six hours, covering a total distance of around 35 kilometres (22 miles).

At around 13:30, as the vessel was passing east of Đầu Gỗ Cave, gusts of wind and heavy rain from a flash thunderstorm befell the ship. According to a survivor, passengers had asked the crew to return to shore, but the crew reassured them they were almost at their destination and kept going. The storm eventually caused the ship to capsize, and contact with it was lost. The storm preceded the arrival of Tropical Storm Wipha; Mai Văn Khiêm, the director of the National Center for Hydrometeorological Forecasting, said that the two storms were not related. The passengers were all Vietnamese and consisted mostly of families from Hanoi.

=== Rescue ===
Upon receiving reports of the sinking, Quảng Ninh's provincial authorities launched a rescue operation, mobilising military units, border guards, waterway police, naval special forces, and local search and rescue teams, along with dozens of rescue vessels and fishermen. The location of the accident was approximately 3 kilometres (2 nautical miles) offshore and weather conditions made access to the site difficult.

Four other survivors clung to a floating wooden chair for hours before three of them were rescued; a man drowned after losing strength. One survivor recounted:

A few minutes later, three other men also surfaced and held onto a chair, thinking of a way to swim ashore. But after about 15 minutes, a man about 40 years old grew exhausted and let his hand go—perhaps he was too tired after diving out from inside the boat. He said, "Farewell, y'all, I'm going," then let go and slowly sank under the water. His final words and the look of despair in his eyes still haunt me.

Other survivors described diving underwater to rescue other passengers lost amidst the capsizing. One guided several to safety, including his mother, but lost his girlfriend, who drowned before he could rescue her.

By 17:00 on 19 July, 10 people were rescued; seven by border guards and three by local fishermen. The number of initial survivors rose to 12, of whom 2 died later after being hospitalized, while the death toll reached 28, including 8 children. At around 18:00, a 10-year-old boy was rescued by emergency teams. According to his account, after the boat capsized, he took shelter in an air pocket inside the boat, making his way out later.

In the early hours of 20 July, the authorities began righting the vessel to aid the search for missing victims. The ship was righted by 02:00, after which four cranes lifted it fully above the waterline. Water was pumped from the hull, and four additional bodies were discovered inside, one of which was confirmed to be Trình, the captain. By that point, a total of 10 people had been rescued, 35 bodies were recovered, and 4 people remained missing. The boat was then towed to shore. The bodies of the 4 remaining missing passengers were found between 21 and 26 July.

== Aftermath ==
According to the People's Committee of Quảng Ninh province, 49 people had boarded the ship, including 46 passengers and 3 crew members. The ship had met all safety requirements and was last inspected in January 2025. The number of people on board did not exceed the limit required.

Vietnamese prime minister Phạm Minh Chính extended his condolences to the affected families. He also directed defense and public security units to accelerate rescue efforts. He urged a thorough investigation into the cause of the incident and pledged to take firm action against any wrongdoing.

The deputy director of the Department of Construction, Bùi Hồng Minh, said, "During the salvage process, we found that 80–90% of the victims brought out of the ship were wearing life jackets. This means that the captain had previously warned passengers wearing life jackets to be ready to respond to adverse situations."

Quảng Ninh province pledged ₫25 million (US$956) to each family of the deceased and ₫8 million (US$306) for the injured. The Vietnam Fatherland Front Committee of Quang Ninh province provided ₫5 million (US$191) to families of the deceased and ₫3 million (US$115) to families of the injured, while local businesses donated up to ₫40 million (US$1,530). In addition, many other private enterprises also contributed. Specifically, Sun Group supported the victims with a total amount of more than ₫2 billion, equivalent to ₫45 million for each of the deceased and ₫25 million for each survivor. On July 22, the Vietnam Fatherland Front Committee of Quảng Ninh province received a total amount of ₫220 million donated by the Northern Provinces Tourism Association Committee and the Ha Long Tourist Boat Association.

Regarding insurance liability, Bao Long Insurance Company's Quảng Ninh branch confirmed it would pay ₫30 million to each person under the civil liability insurance contract, with the total amount for all victims reaching ₫1.2 billion. According to a report from the Insurance Management and Supervision Department under the Vietnam Ministry of Finance, the total amount of money paid by non-life and life insurance sources is estimated at more than ₫14.3 billion, of which more than ₫10 billion came from life insurance companies such as Bao Viet, Generali and Manulife, while the rest came from non-life insurance companies. In addition to direct financial support, numerous tourism units and hotels in Hạ Long also provided free accommodation, meals, and transportation for the victims' relatives during their stay. In particular, a representative of the Quảng Ninh Tourism Association said that more than 20 hotels in Hạ Long proactively registered to provide free support for the victims. The reception, allocation and transparency of donations were carried out by the Vietnam Fatherland Front Committee of Quảng Ninh. Singer Han Sara donated revenue from the physical disc Unfrozen and the music video Do anh si to the Vietnam Fatherland Front Committee of Quảng Ninh.

In the weeks after the sinking, ship owners reported an 80% decrease in tour boat bookings in Hạ Long Bay.

== International reaction ==
On the morning of July 21, 2025, US Ambassador to Vietnam Marc Knapper sent condolences over the ship capsize in Hạ Long Bay, and affirmed his readiness to cooperate with Vietnam in disaster prevention and rescue. Along with that, the Russian Embassy in Vietnam and countries such as Switzerland, Canada, United Kingdom, Venezuela also expressed their condolences to the families of the victims.

Also on July 21, 2025, many of the world's top football clubs from Europe posted articles expressing condolences to the victims of the incident in Vietnam, most notably Atlético Madrid (Spain) and Werder Bremen (Germany).

On July 22, 2025, according to information from the Ministry of Foreign Affairs of Vietnam, Lao Prime Minister Sonexay Siphandone sent a telegram of condolences to Prime Minister Phạm Minh Chính regarding the sudden capsize of a tourist boat in Hạ Long Bay. Also on this day, Lao Foreign Minister Thongsavanh Phomvihane and Japanese Foreign Minister Takeshi Iwaya also sent telegrams of condolences and greetings to Deputy Prime Minister and Minister of Foreign Affairs Bùi Thanh Sơn.

On 23 July 2025, the Ministry of Foreign Affairs of the United Arab Emirates sent condolences on the capsized boat in Hạ Long Bay to the families of the victims, the Government and people of Vietnam, and wished a speedy recovery to the injured.

== Memorial ==
On 22 July 2025, 20:00 WIT at Gelora Bung Karno Stadium, Jakarta, Indonesia, before the football match between Vietnam and Cambodia in the group stage of the 2025 ASEAN U-23 Championship, both teams observed a minute of silence to commemorate the victims of the shipwreck in Hạ Long Bay. Previously, the Vietnam Football Federation (VFF) sent a request to the tournament organizers as well as the ASEAN Football Federation (AFF) and was approved.

On July 28, 2025, at Hạ Long International Passenger Port, Quảng Ninh province coordinated with the Executive Committee of the Vietnam Buddhist Sangha of Quảng Ninh province to hold a memorial service for the 39 victims who died in the shipwreck accident in Hạ Long Bay.

== Controversies ==
=== Misinformation and exploitation of events ===
At that time, on social networks, there were a number of articles and content with the purpose of profiting from the incident. Specifically, a number of fanpages on the Facebook platform used artificial intelligence technology to create images and videos and fictional stories. Most of those articles will be presented in an emotional way and have a loose ending with the words "Đọc tiếp dưới bình luận" (Read more in comments) to redirect users to websites containing many advertisements to gain profit. And although the words "fictional details" or "illustrative images" are inserted, the font size is too small, making it difficult for readers to distinguish between real and fake, causing some social network users to misunderstand and leave comments expressing condolences and mourning for unreal characters. This situation has led to the spread of false information, causing public confusion and especially affecting the psychology of the victims' relatives. Therefore, after those articles were posted, in addition to the wave of sympathy, other users promptly discovered and criticized the act of profiting from the tragedy, and at the same time called on users to be careful, not to share unverified content and to prioritize receiving information from official sources.

Another case on July 22 was when a number of fanpages on the Facebook platform posted pictures of a group of 5 to 6 children standing on the bow of a ship to visit Hạ Long Bay, notably the post was captioned with "Pictures of the children on the fateful ship" or "The last moments before the ship capsized" and turned to black and white, causing many people to mistake and think that these were the victims of the accident. The post quickly attracted hundreds of thousands of interactions, with many comments expressing condolences to the children. Immediately after that, a person believed to be a relative of the children spoke out against the images of his children and grandchildren being spread on social networks with false information, and at the same time he also said that the children in the picture were his children and grandchildren.

According to him, the photo was taken during a family trip to Hạ Long in August 2024. However, for unknown reasons, the photo was re-shared by some fanpages with fabricated content. That day, when he was surfing the internet and accidentally discovered the incident, he was extremely angry because the children in the photo were completely normal and had nothing to do with the accident. In addition, he also proactively contacted the fanpages that posted the false information to request its removal, however, he has not yet received any response or apology from the fanpages.

The spread of the image with the false information has made many of his relatives living in Vietnam extremely confused and worried. He said that his family had to constantly reassure everyone after this false information appeared on social networking platforms. Faced with this situation, he expressed his hope that the authorities would soon intervene and strictly handle information pages that post false information, especially content that violates privacy and images of children.

=== Mass reaction ===
In addition to comments expressing condolences for the victims, there were some criticisms about the passengers going out to sea when there was bad weather information. Some online communities asked questions such as: "Why did they go out when the storm was forecast?" or "Knowing the danger and still going out to sea?", "Going to sea without wearing a life jacket is too subjective", "Knowing there was a storm and still going, wasting money?", "It's not the weather, it's their fault for not taking precautions"... However, many people have called on people to stop blaming the victims, and many have shared images of clear weather at noon that day to show that the thunderstorm was sudden and unpredictable.

In the face of public controversy, Dr. Nguyễn Ngọc Huy, a weather researcher and extreme disaster warning expert, posted an article titled "The victim is not at fault" on his personal page, answering common questions after the accident. He said and affirmed that at 13:30, the weather report was updated and warned of the possibility of tornadoes that day. At that time, the ship Wonder Sea had already left port, and other ships were then asked to stop operating. Regarding forecasting capabilities, he said that both the two strongest forecasting models today, GFS and ECMWF, did not warn of thunderstorms in the Hạ Long Bay area from 12:00 to 2:00 p.m. on the day of the incident. In addition, radar and satellite images also detected a cluster of thunderclouds storms when the weather phenomena had occurred. From his perspective, he believed that it was a "rare super thunderstorm cloud", which could have created a local tornado, which is why even modern ships or experienced captains would have difficulty handling if they encountered this situation.

=== Entertainment activities ===
On the evening of July 19, 2025, which was also the time when the authorities were carrying out rescue work in the Wonder Sea ship capsize, two cruise ships named Ambassador Cruise and Sea Octopus were still carrying out fireworks and organizing entertainment activities, typically playing music on Hạ Long Bay. Immediately after that, some tourists live broadcast on social network and showed that fireworks performance. After that, these two businesses received a wave of criticism and boycott. Public opinion said that organizing entertainment activities while rescue work was taking place urgently was inappropriate, especially in the context of more than a thousand people and hundreds of vehicles actively searching for victims in the bay. More specifically, there were people sharing and criticizing this offensive issue. A woman who has worked for many years in the local tourism industry also expressed her opinion that organizing such entertainment activities near the rescue scene was inappropriate in such a tragic context. She also added that many service facilities and entertainment venues in the Hạ Long area had proactively limited party activities that evening to show respect for the victims. In addition, she said that the argument that the ship lost its Internet connection and could not update information in time was not convincing, because the incident happened at around 17:00 but the fireworks display did not start until 21:00 that same day.

Meanwhile, Sea Octopus confirmed that the fireworks display during the rescue operation was a serious and unacceptable mistake. The unit's representative said that the cause stemmed from a lack of information updating and situation assessment, which caused a part of the ship's operations to be not fully aware of the ongoing incident. The unit also pledged to tighten its emergency information and internal operations procedures, and expressed its desire to accompany and support the victims' families in the post-accident period. Immediately afterwards, on July 24, at the regular press conference for the second quarter of 2025 of the Ministry of Culture, Sports and Tourism of Vietnam, Deputy Director of the Vietnam National Authority of Tourism – Phạm Văn Thủy criticized the act of selling fireworks as an insensitive act.
