= There is no God! =

1975 Soviet propaganda poster created by Vladimir Menshikov

Бога нет!
- There is no God! (English)
- Artist: Vladimir Menshikov
- Year: 1975
- Medium: Soviet poster
- Subject: Atheism, anti-religious propaganda

There is no God! (Бога нет!, transliterated: Boga net! or Boga nyet!) is a 1975 Soviet communist propaganda poster created by graphic artist Vladimir Menshikov. One of the most iconic examples of Soviet anti-religious propaganda, the poster features a cosmonaut in space declaring, "There is no God!", referencing a famous remark by Soviet cosmonaut Gherman Titov in 1962. Sometimes the saying is attributed to Yuri Gagarin.

== Background ==
In 1962, Gherman Titov, the second person to orbit the Earth after Yuri Gagarin, visited the Century 21 Exposition (also known as the Seattle World's Fair) in Seattle, United States. In a press conference, when asked how spaceflight had affected his worldview, Titov stated:

Sometimes people are saying that God is out there. I was looking around attentively all day but I didn't find anybody there. I saw neither angels nor God.

He added:

Up until the orbital flight of Major Gagarin, no god was helping make the rocket. The rocket was made certainly by our people and the flight was carried out by man. So I don't believe in God. I believe in man – in his strengths, his possibilities, and his reason.

These remarks, widely reported in the American press, were interpreted as a blunt affirmation of Soviet atheism, sparking controversy and criticism in Western media.

== Description ==
The poster, produced in 1975 by Leningrad-based graphic artist Vladimir Menshikov (1933–1994), depicts a Soviet cosmonaut floating in space, hand to brow as if searching the cosmos. Beneath him, silhouettes of religious architecture – onion domes, a crescent moon, and a Latin cross – anchor the image in earthly religiosity. The cosmonaut declares: “There is no God!” (Бога нет!).

Historian Julie K. deGraffenried comments:

Perhaps the most famous of all antireligious posters, Vladimir Menshikov's 1975 Boga net! (‘There is no God!’) nods to religion via rooftops—onion domes, a crescent, a Latin cross.

The visual narrative portrays the cosmos as empty of divine beings and filled instead with rational, scientific potential — aligning with the ideological messaging of Soviet state atheism.

== Artist ==
Vladimir Mikhailovich Menshikov (1933–1994) was a noted Soviet graphic artist based in Leningrad. He was a member of the Union of Artists of the USSR and specialized in woodcuts and political posters, including military and anti-religious themes.

== Legacy ==
There is no God! is one of the most recognized artifacts of Soviet anti-religious propaganda. It has been featured in exhibitions such as "Church and Religion in Soviet Posters" at the University of Marburg, and is housed in collections including the State Museum of the History of Religion in Saint Petersburg.

Scholar Sandra Frimmel wrote:

The skies are free from divine beings, but full of starry promises.

== See also ==
- Alexei Leonov (1934–2019)
- Atheism in the Soviet Union
- League of Militant Atheists
- List of Soviet poster artists
- Propaganda in the Soviet Union
