= Polkovnikovo =

Polkovnikovo Полковниково
- Selo
- Location within Altai Krai Location within Russia
- Coordinates: 53°12′N 84°38′E
- Country: Russia
- Region: Altai Krai
- District: Kosikhinsky District
- Time zone: UTC+7:00

Polkovnikovo (Russian: Полковниково) is a rural locality (a selo) and the administrative center of Polkovnikovsky Selsoviet, Kosikhinsky District, Altai Krai, Russia. The population was 690 as of 2013. There are 17 streets.

== Geography ==
Polkovnikovo is located 19 km south of Kosikha (the district's administrative centre) by road. Nalobikha is the nearest rural locality.
