= Kosikha =

Kosikha (Russian: Косиха) is the name of several rural localities in Russia:

- Kosikha, Kontoshinsky Selsoviet, Kosikhinsky District, Altai Krai, a junction in Kontoshinsky Selsoviet of Kosikhinsky District, Altai Krai
- Kosikha, Kosikhinsky Selsoviet, Kosikhinsky District, Altai Krai, a selo in Kosikhinsky Selsoviet of Kosikhinsky District, Altai Krai
- Kosikha, Kostroma Oblast, a village in Krivyachskoye Settlement of Sharyinsky District, Kostroma Oblast
