= Ti Tốp Island =

Island in Vietnam

Titov Island
Native name: Đảo Ti Tốp
- Location within Vietnam

Geography
- Location: Vịnh Hạ Long
- Coordinates: 20°51′45″N 107°04′02″E

Administration
- Việt Nam

Ti Tốp Island, or Titov Island, is a small island in Hạ Long Bay, Quảng Ninh province, Vietnam. The island is located about 7–8 kilometres (4.3–5.0 mi) southeast of Bãi Cháy Port. It lies within Cửa Lục Bay, opposite Sửng Sốt Cave on Bồ Hòn Island; to the west is Dầm Nam Island, and to the north is Dầm Bắc Island.

== History ==
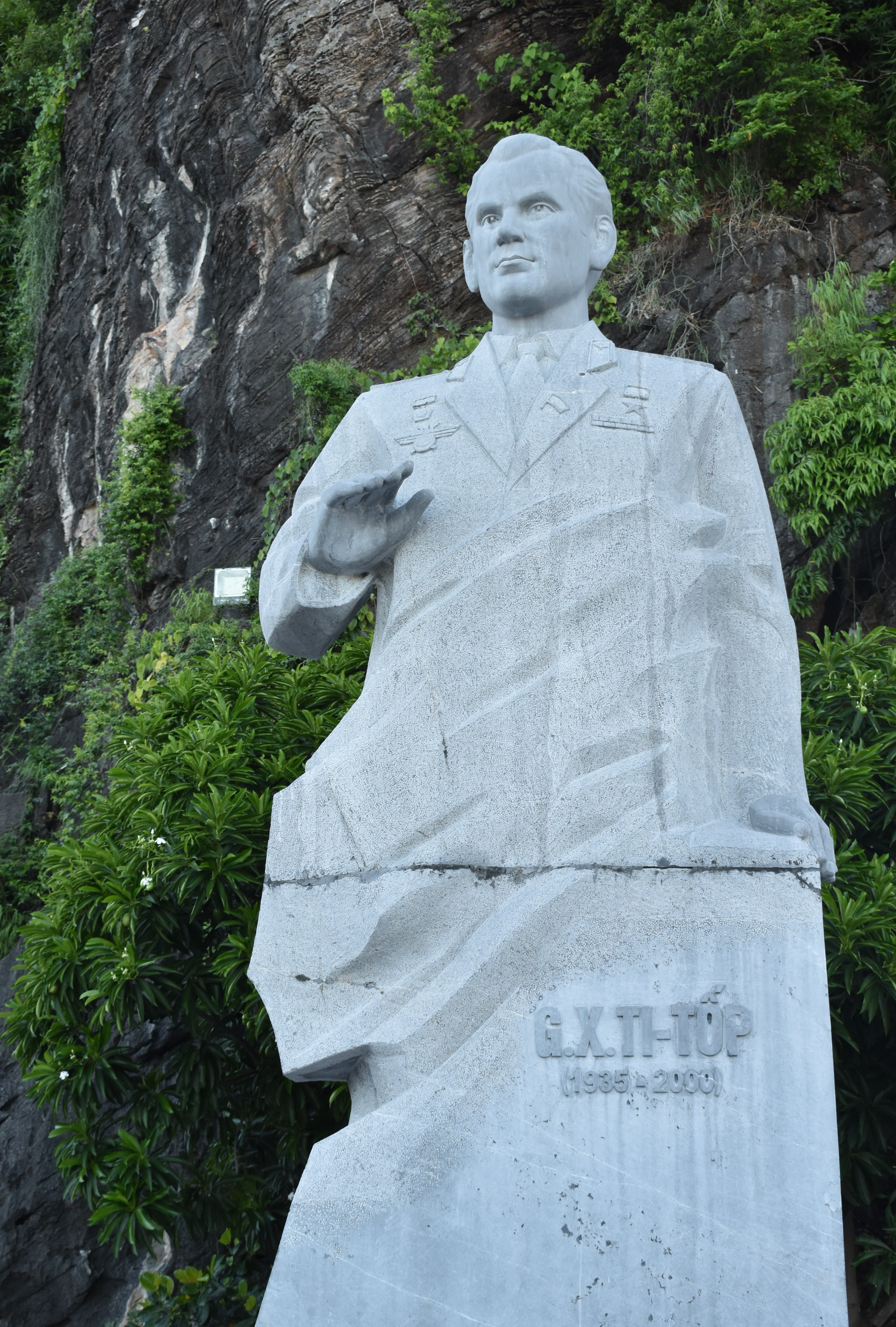
Titov's monument in Ti Tốp Island

According to various documents, maps from different periods, and local folklore, the island was formerly known as Hồng Thập Tự Island (Red Cross Island) or Nghĩa Địa Island (Cemetery Island). The name is linked to an incident in 1905, when a French cargo ship entering Hạ Long Bay, lacking a navigator familiar with the area, struck a reef and sank in Con Cóc Lagoon. The sailors who died were buried on the island. In later years, the island became deserted. A French map of Hạ Long Bay drawn in the late 19th century referred to the island as Cát Nàng.

On 22 January 1962, President Hồ Chí Minh and Soviet cosmonaut Gherman Titov visited the island.To commemorate the visit, Hồ Chí Minh renamed it Ti Tốp Island (Titov Island). A monument in Titov's honor was erected on the island in 2015.

== Tourism ==
Ti Tốp is an island with steep banks and one sloping side featuring a flat, white sand beach. Cruise ships often stop here, allowing visitors to go ashore to swim or climb to the summit for a panoramic view. From above, Ti Tốp Beach resembles a crescent moon at the foot of the island.

Unlike many other attractions in Hạ Long Bay, Ti Tốp Island has a sandy beach known as Ti Tốp Beach. Although the beach is relatively small, it is quiet, breezy, and well maintained. The sand is regularly washed by the tide, and the sea water remains clear throughout the year.

The island's shoreline can be viewed by boat or by seaplane. In 2015, The New York Times listed viewing Bái Tử Long Bay and Hạ Long Bay from a seaplane among the most attractive travel experiences of that year.
