= Ouderkerk =

- Former municipality
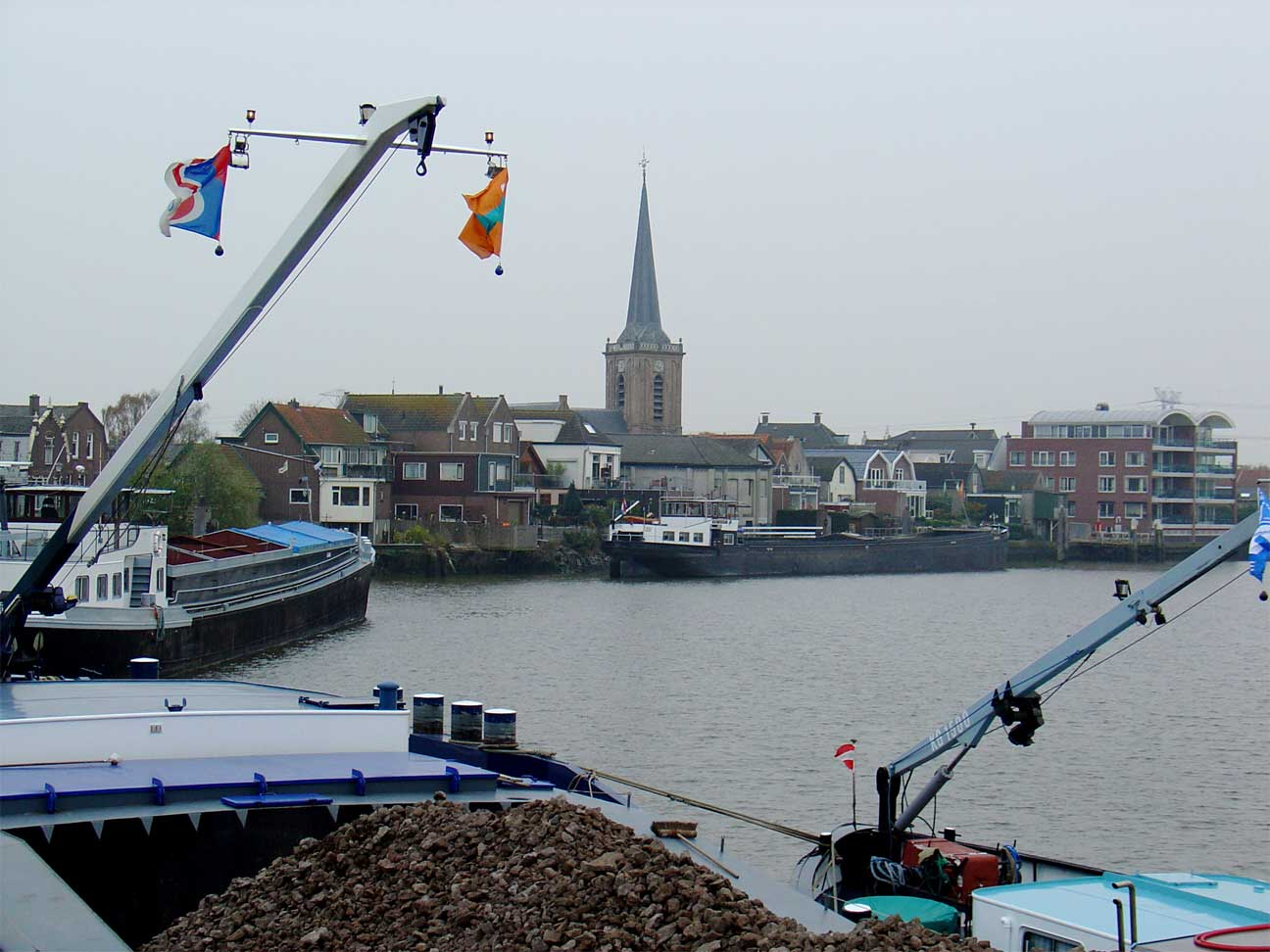
- View over Ouderkerk aan den IJssel

- Flag Coat of arms

- Location in South Holland
- Coordinates: 51°56′N 4°38′E
- Country: Netherlands
- Province: South Holland
- Municipality: Krimpenerwaard
- Established: 1 January 1985

Area
  - Total: 28.57 km^{2} (11.03 sq mi)
  - Land: 27.07 km^{2} (10.45 sq mi)
  - Water: 1.50 km^{2} (0.58 sq mi)
- Elevation: 0 m (0 ft)

Population (January 2021)
  - Total: data missing
- Demonym: Ouderkerker
- Time zone: UTC+1 (CET)
  - Summer (DST): UTC+2 (CEST)
- Postcode: 2830–2831, 2935
- Area code: 0180, 0182
- Website: www.ouderkerk.nl

Ouderkerk (Dutch pronunciation: [ˈʌudərˌkɛr(ə)k]) is a former municipality in the western Netherlands, in the province of South Holland. Since 2015 it has been a part of the municipality of Krimpenerwaard.

The former municipality covered an area of 28.57 km^{2} (11.03 sq mi) of which 1.50 km^{2} (0.58 sq mi) was water. It was formed on 1 January 1985, after a municipal reorganization.

The former municipality of Ouderkerk consisted of the population centres Gouderak, Lageweg, Ouderkerk aan den IJssel, and IJssellaan, all situated along the Hollandse IJssel river.

== Topography ==
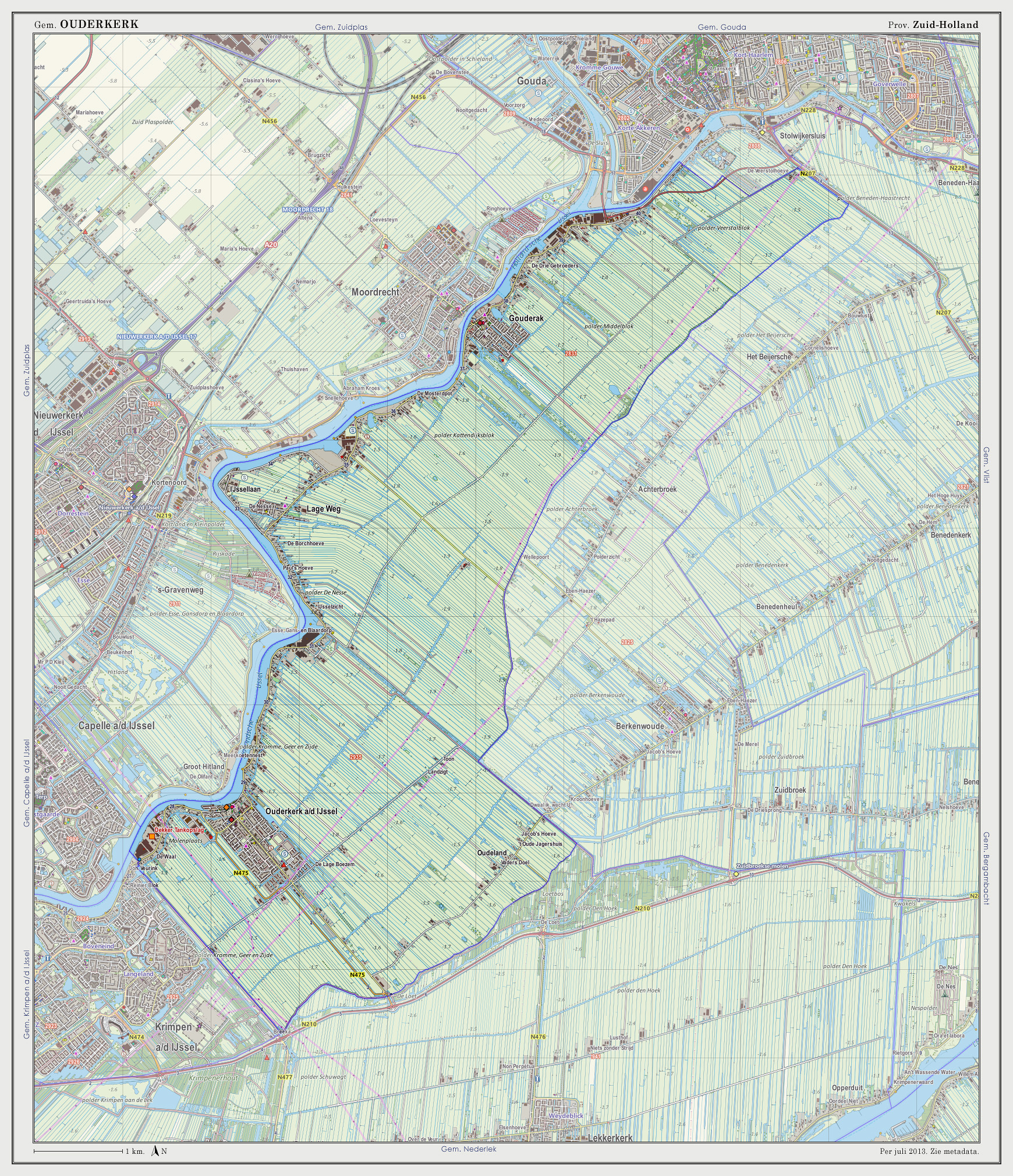

Dutch Topographic map of the former municipality of Ouderkerk, 2013.
