= Kragon =

Christian saint

Saint Kragon (Coptic: ⲁⲡⲁ ⲕⲣⲁⲅⲟⲛ, ⲁⲡⲟⲕⲣⲁϫⲱⲛ, Arabic: أبا كراجون) (also known as Abakerazun) was a robber converted to Christianity. He was a reformed robber and bandit. He died as a martyr in Alexandria and was buried at Pineban (Coptic: ⲡⲓⲛⲉⲃⲁⲛ, Arabic: البناوان, romanized: al-Banawan). His feast day is July 19. He is referenced in Les Martyrs d'Égypte by Hippolyte Delehaye.

== Literature ==
- Holweck, F. G. A Biographical Dictionary of the Saint. St. Louis, MO: B. Herder Book Co. 1924.
