= Ouderkerk aan den IJssel =

- village
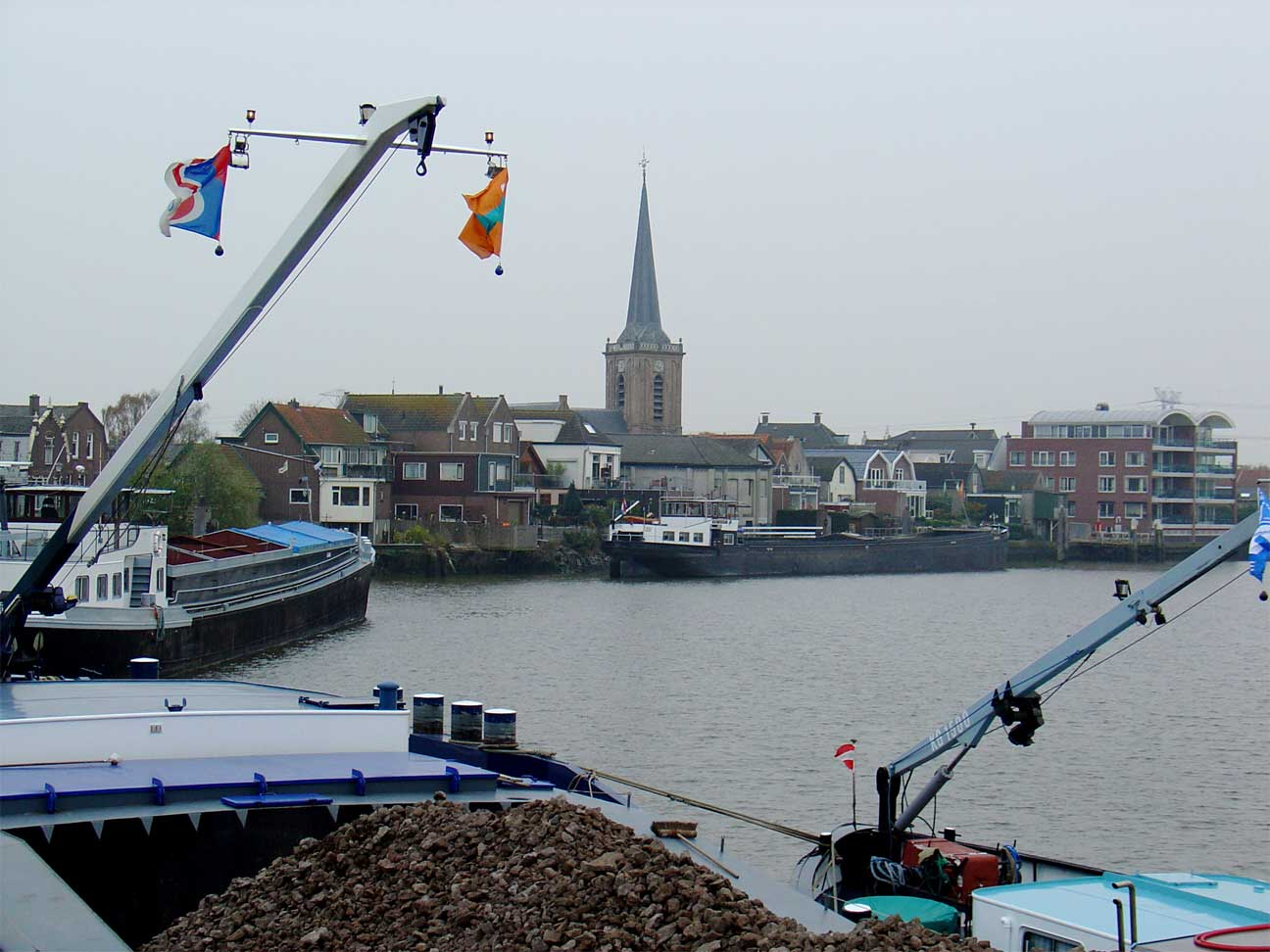
- View of Ouderkerk aan den IJssel

- Coat of arms
- Interactive map of Ouderkerk aan den IJssel
- Coordinates: 51°55′56″N 4°38′10″E
- Country: Netherlands
- Province: South Holland
- Municipality: Krimpenerwaard

Area
  - Total: 18.14 km^{2} (7.00 sq mi)

Population (2026)
  - Total: 5.936

Ouderkerk aan den IJssel (Dutch pronunciation: [ˌʌudərkɛr(ə)k aːn də(n) ˈɛisəl]; English: Ouderkerk upon IJssel) is a village in the municipality of Krimpenerwaard, in the province of South Holland, the Netherlands. It is situated along the river Hollandse IJssel and has over 4000 inhabitants.

Ouderkerk aan den IJssel, together with Lageweg and IJssellaan, was a separate municipality until 1 January 1985 when the municipalities in the Krimpenerwaard were reorganized and it was merged with Gouderak to form the municipality Ouderkerk. Of these, Ouderkerk aan den IJssel is the largest population centre and the location of the town hall.

== History ==
The town is named for its "old church", which was a prominent landmark for centuries on the horizon for ships travelling along the IJssel river. There is an indication that a little church may have been present here in the 10th century. This would be remarkable since the Krimpenerwaard would have been a swamp at that time except for some minor hills. As the Krimpenerwaard has dried up and the river dikes along the river have been raised, the church has "sunk" much lower in the landscape today than in former centuries, which was the reason for raising the tower in the 19th century.

The oldest official reference to the village is from 1263 when it was called Oudekerke. Though several Roman coins from the fourth century have been found, this does not confirm the presence of a Roman settlement. But it is probable that there was an older village here called IJsele until the 12th century. Remains of a tuff stone church foundation from that same century have been found.

Henry de Nassau, Lord Overkirk, an army leader during the Spanish War of Succession, is buried in the main church.

== Notable people ==
- Stefan de Vrij, footballer
- Javier Guzman, cabaretier, comedian
- Ramon Stoppelenburg, author, world traveler

== Gallery ==
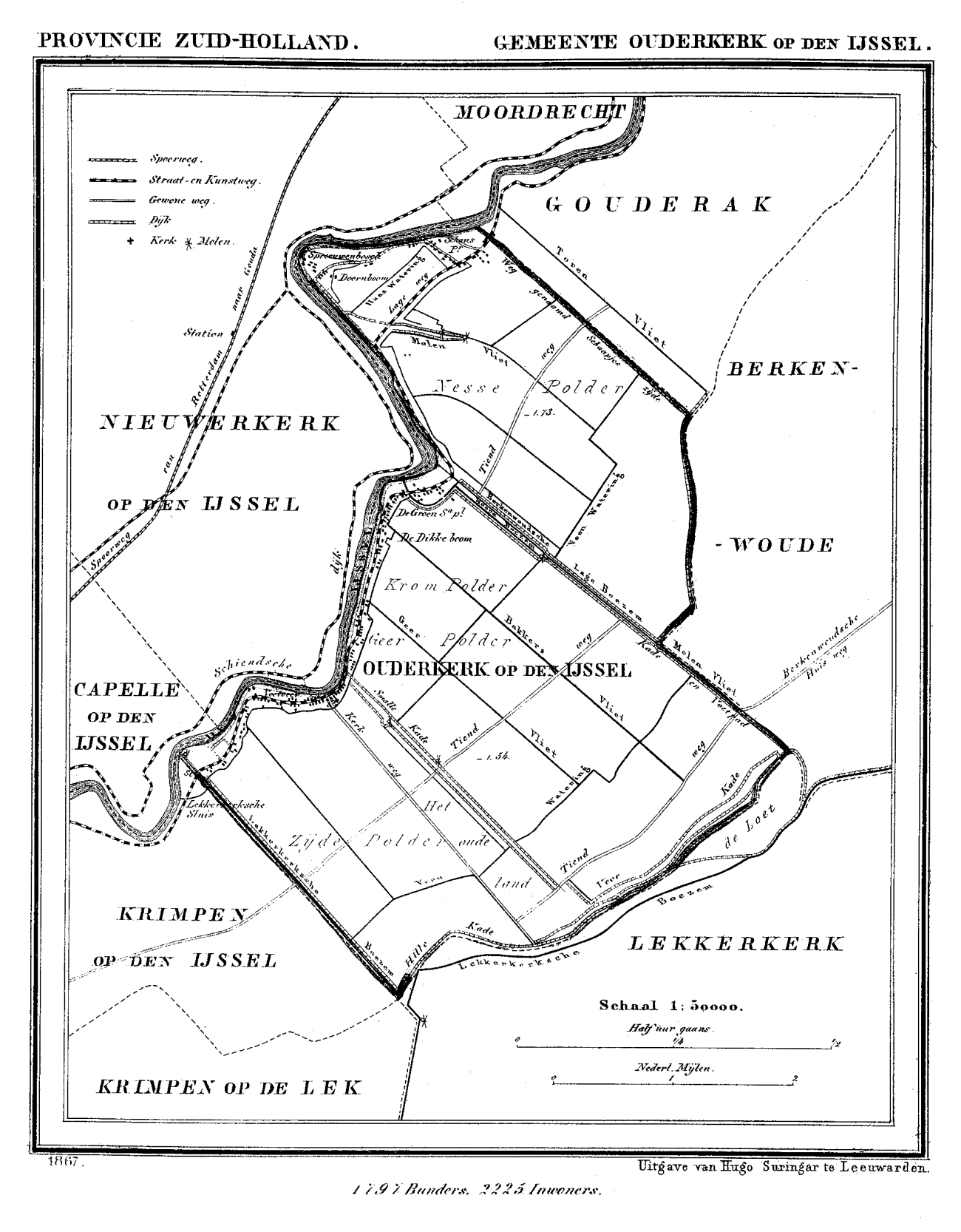
Ouderkerk aan den IJssel in 1867.

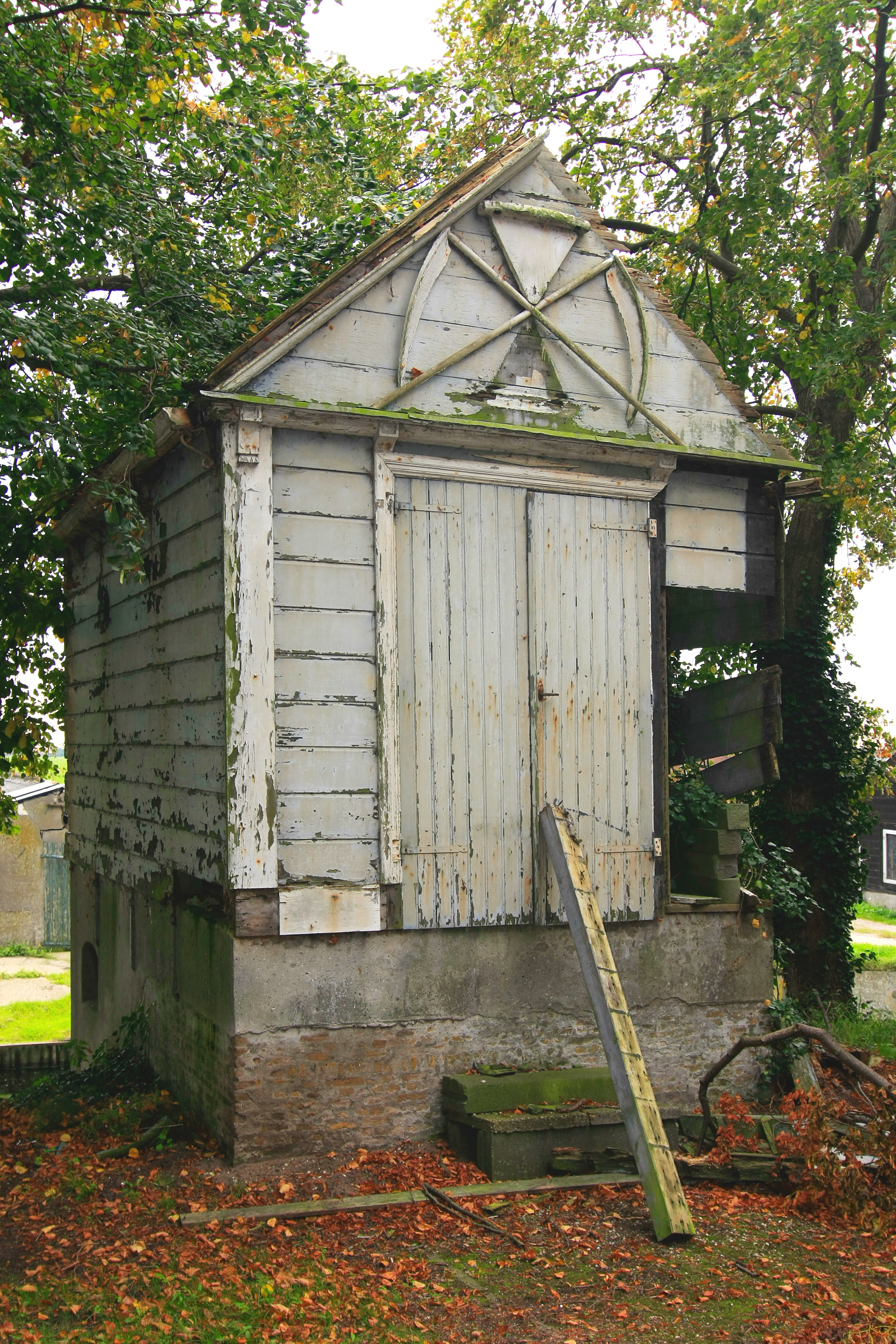
Old wooden mortuarium built in the early 19th century in neoclassical style for the cemetery situated against the dijk.

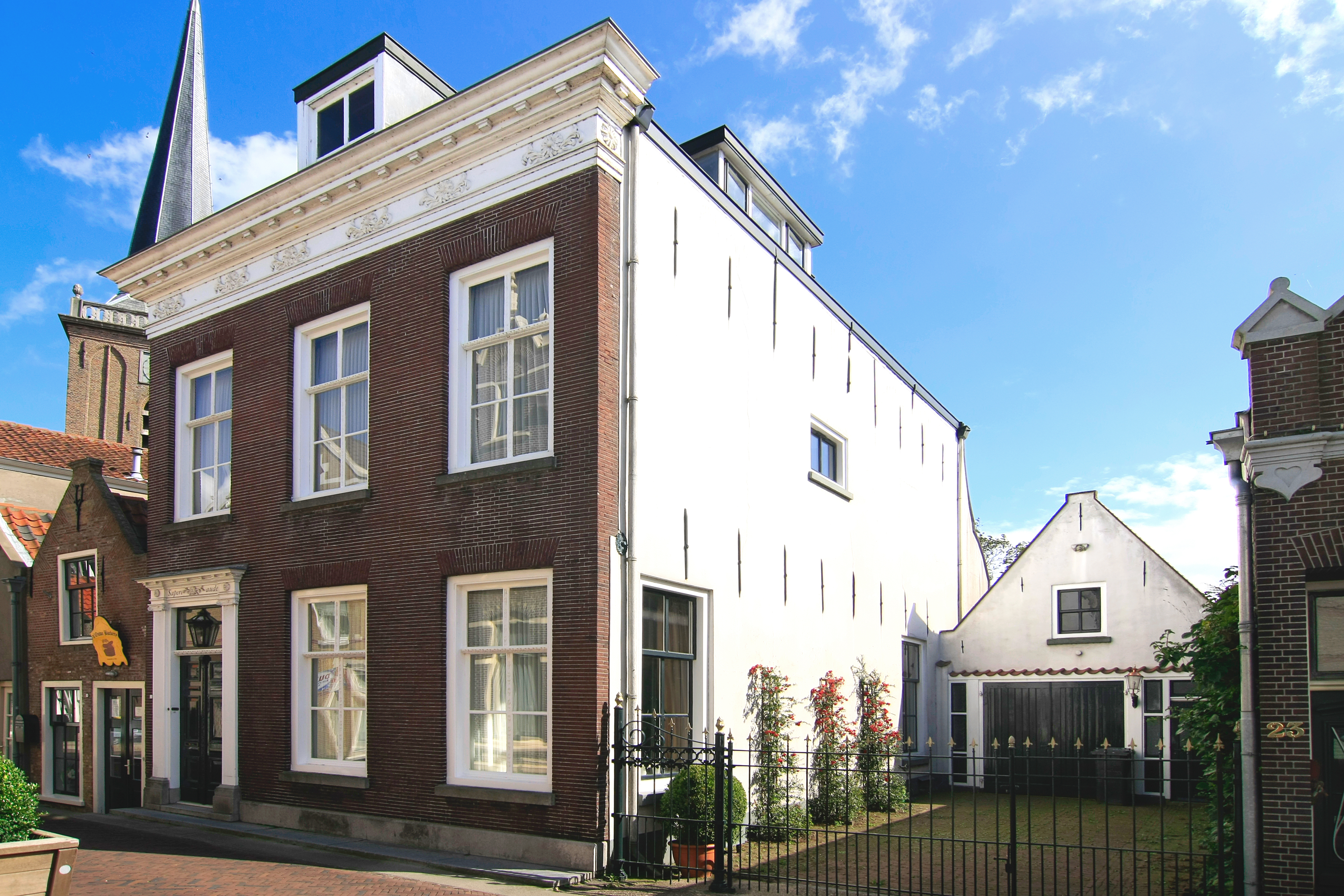
Dorpstraat, behind the church.
