= Gouderak =

Coordinates: 51°59′N 4°41′E

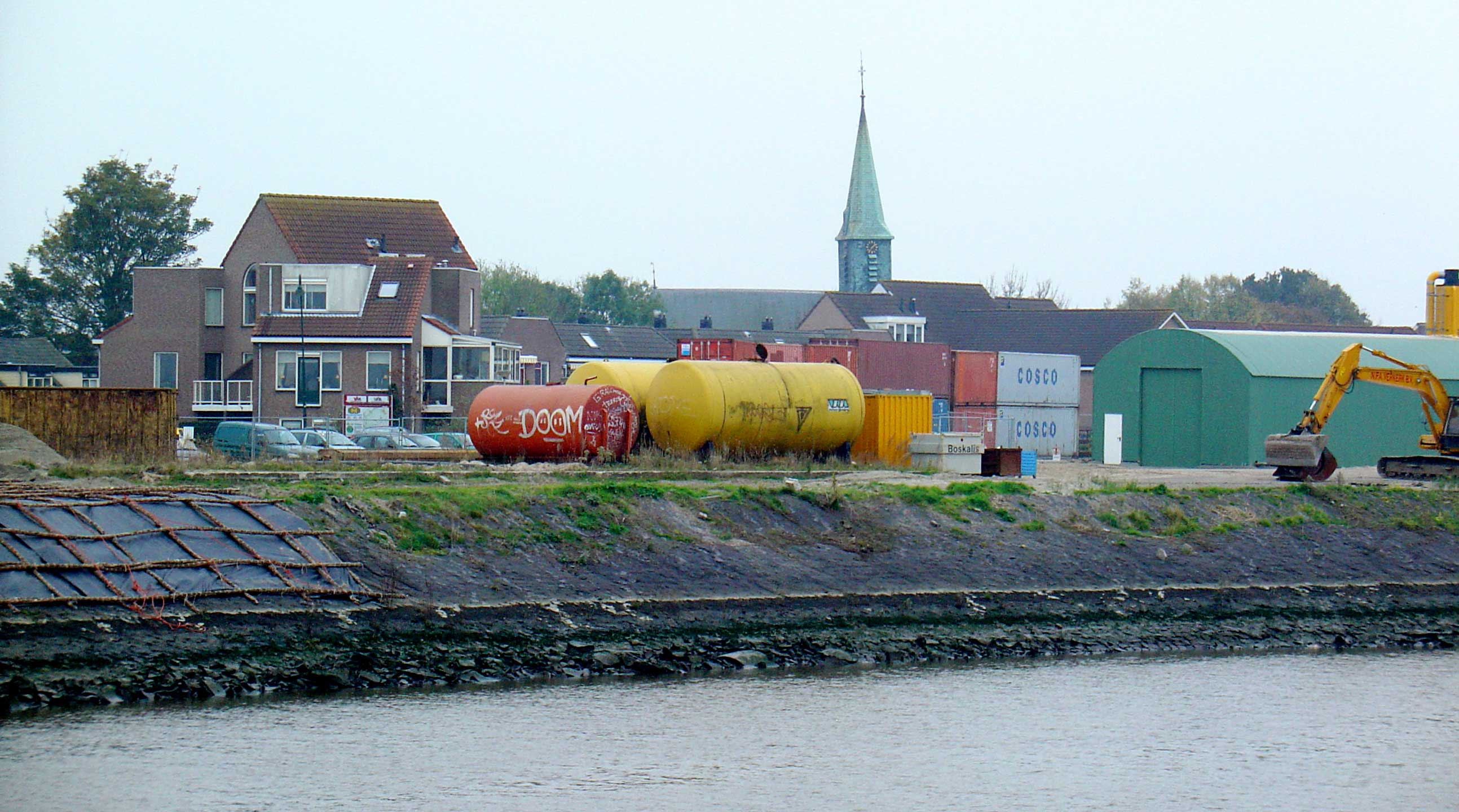
- Zicht op Gouderak

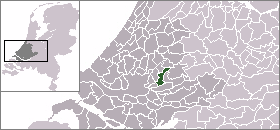
- Country: Netherlands
- Province: South Holland
- Municipality: Krimpenerwaard

Population (2026)
  - Total: 2.628
- Postal code: 2831
- Dialing Code: 0182

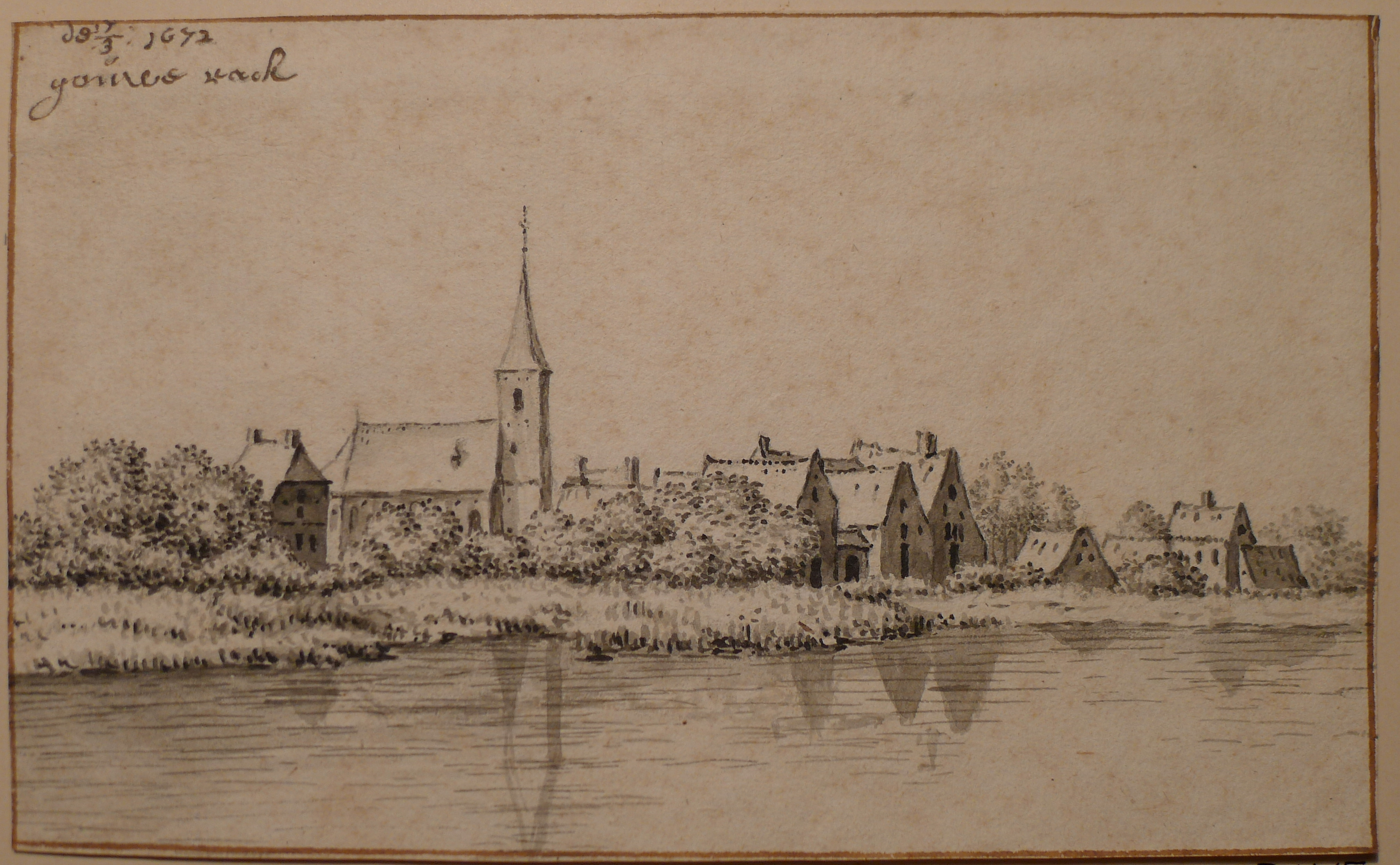
Representation of the village in 1672.

Gouderak is a village in the Dutch province of South Holland. It is located 4 km southwest of Gouda on the river Hollandsche IJssel, in the municipality of Krimpenerwaard.

Gouderak was a separate municipality until 1985, when it merged with Lageweg (Ouderkerk) and Ouderkerk aan den IJssel to become part of Ouderkerk.
