= Košíky =

- Municipality
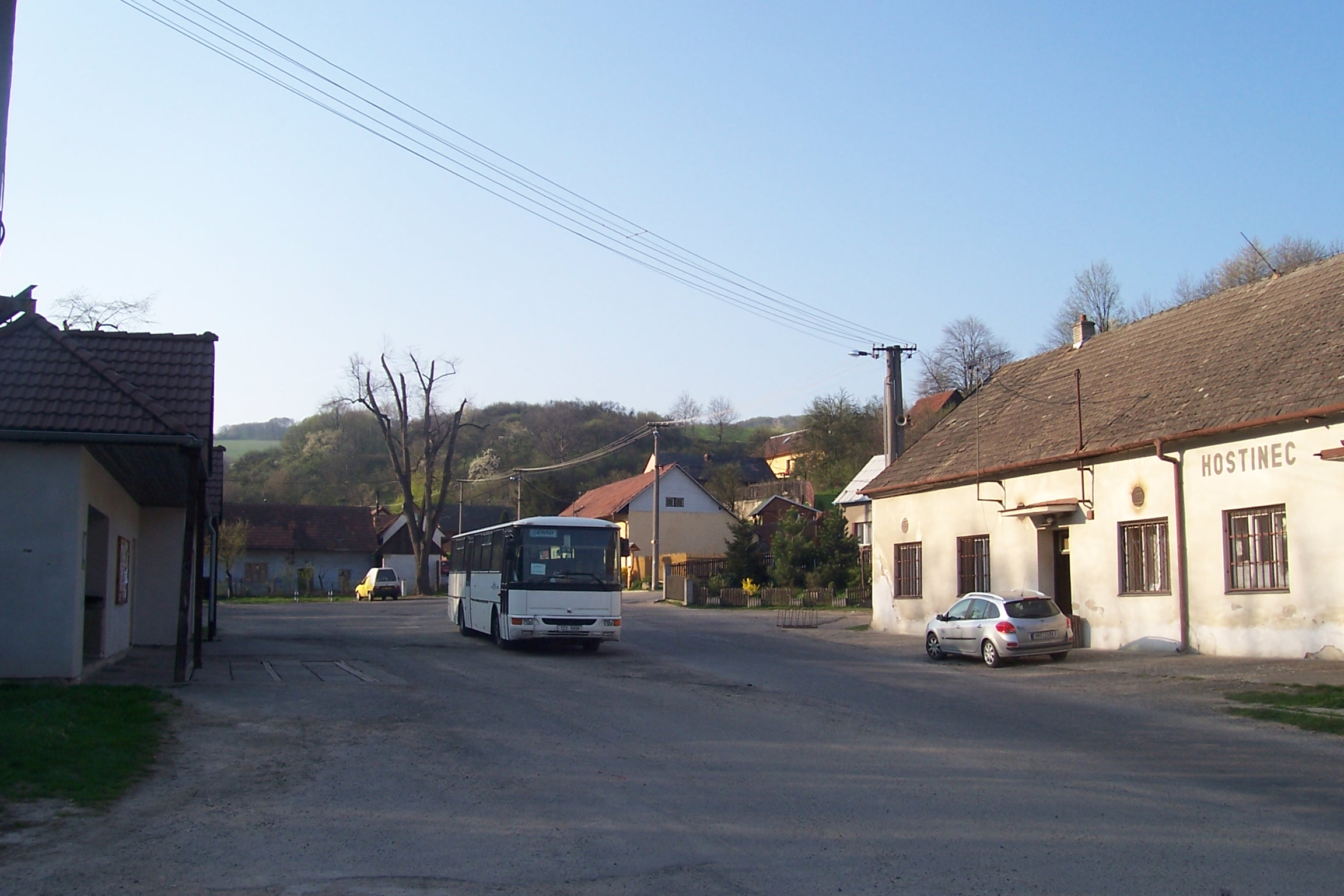
- Centre of Košíky

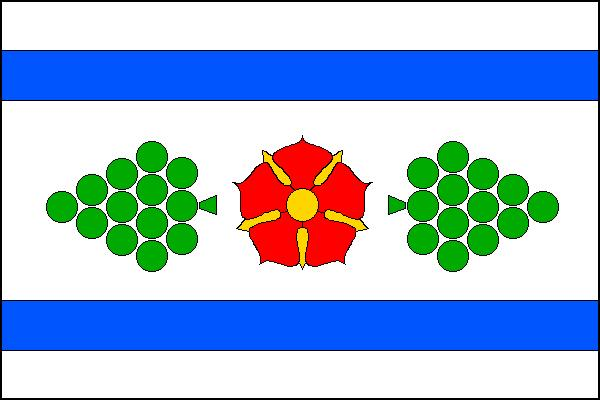
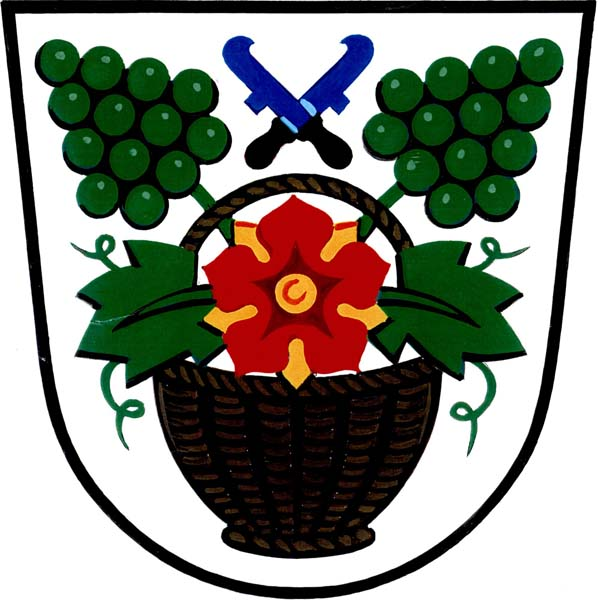
- Flag Coat of arms

- Location in the Czech Republic
- Coordinates: 49°9′27″N 17°24′58″E
- Country: Czech Republic
- Region: Zlín
- District: Uherské Hradiště
- First mentioned: 1618

Area
  - Total: 10.15 km^{2} (3.92 sq mi)
- Elevation: 278 m (912 ft)

Population (2026-01-01)
  - Total: 436
  - Density: 43.0/km^{2} (111/sq mi)
- Time zone: UTC+1 (CET)
  - Summer (DST): UTC+2 (CEST)
- Postal code: 687 04
- Website: www.oukosiky.cz

Košíky is a municipality and village in Uherské Hradiště District in the Zlín Region of the Czech Republic. It has about 400 inhabitants.

Košíky lies approximately 12 kilometres (7 mi) north of Uherské Hradiště, 20 km (12 mi) south-west of Zlín, and 240 km (150 mi) south-east of Prague.

== Demographics ==
Historical population
| Year | Pop. | ±% |
|---|---|---|
| 1869 | 591 | — |
| 1880 | 612 | +3.6% |
| 1890 | 658 | +7.5% |
| 1900 | 708 | +7.6% |
| 1910 | 701 | −1.0% |
| 1921 | 697 | −0.6% |
| 1930 | 663 | −4.9% |
| 1950 | 663 | +0.0% |
| 1961 | 664 | +0.2% |
| 1970 | 585 | −11.9% |
| 1980 | 507 | −13.3% |
| 1991 | 440 | −13.2% |
| 2001 | 418 | −5.0% |
| 2011 | 402 | −3.8% |
| 2021 | 411 | +2.2% |
Source: Censuses

== Twin towns – sister cities ==
Košíky is twinned with:

- Nová Bošáca, Slovakia
