= Michael W. Vannier =

American radiologist

Michael W. Vannier (born January 12, 1949) is a radiologist in Chicago.

He earned his medical degree from University of Kentucky College of Medicine and did his residency at the Mallinckrodt Institute of Radiology at the Washington University School of Medicine.

On July 19, 1983, Vannier (Mallinckrodt Institute of Radiology) and his co-workers J. Marsh (Cleft Palate and Craniofacial Deformities Institute, St. Louis Children's Hospital) and J. Warren (McDonnell Aircraft Company) published the first three-dimensional reconstruction of single CT slices of the human head.
