= Kosikhinsky District =

Kosikhinsky District Косихинский район (Russian)
- District
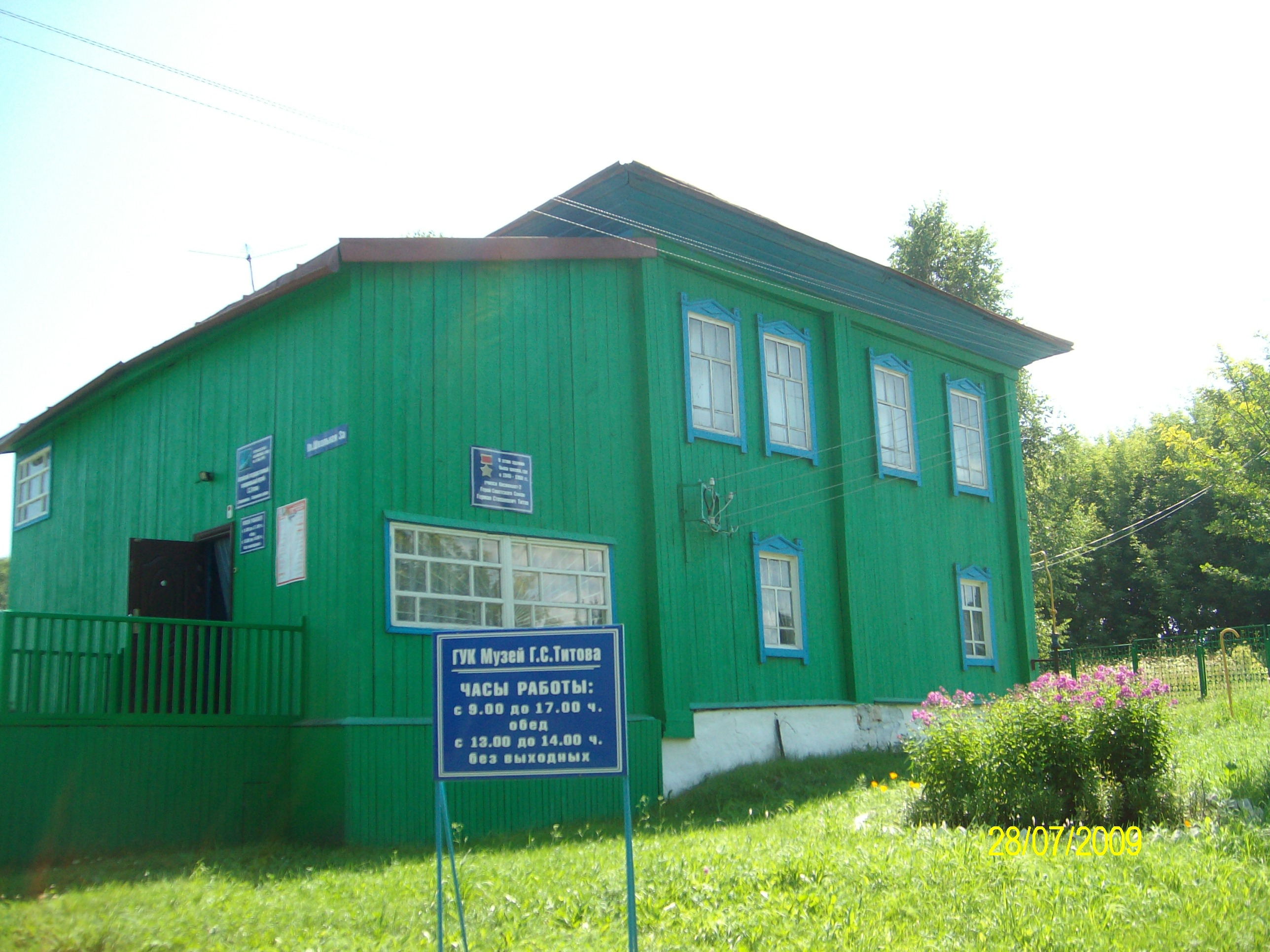
- Memorial museum of Gherman Titov in the selo of Polkovnikovo, Kosikhinsky District

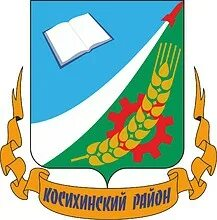
- Coat of arms
- Location of Kosikhinsky District in Altai Krai
- Coordinates: 53°21′36″N 84°35′03″E
- Country: Russia
- Federal subject: Altai Krai
- Established: 1924
- Administrative center: Kosikha

Area
  - Total: 1,877 km^{2} (725 sq mi)

Population (2010 Census)
  - Total: 17,927
  - Density: 9.551/km^{2} (24.74/sq mi)
  - Urban: 0%
  - Rural: 100%

Administrative structure
  - Administrative divisions: 11 Selsoviets
  - Inhabited localities: 26 rural localities

Municipal structure
  - Municipally incorporated as: Kosikhinsky Municipal District
  - Municipal divisions: 0 urban settlements, 11 rural settlements
- Time zone: UTC+7 (MSK+4)
- OKTMO ID: 01618000
- Website: www.altairegion22.ru

Kosikhinsky District (Russian: Коси́хинский райо́н) is an administrative and municipal district (raion), one of the fifty-nine in Altai Krai, Russia. It is located in the northeast of the krai. The area of the district is 1,877 square kilometers (725 sq mi). Its administrative center is the rural locality (a selo) of Kosikha. Population: 17,927 (2010 census); 20,494 (2002 census); 21,863 (1989 Soviet census). The population of the administrative center accounts for 29.2% of the district's total population.
