= Kosikha, Kosikhinsky Selsoviet, Kosikhinsky District, Altai Krai =

Rural locality in Russia

Kosikha Косиха
- Selo
- Interactive map of Kosikha
- Location of Kosikha Kosikha (Altai Krai)
- Coordinates: 53°21′41″N 84°34′48″E
- Country: Russia
- Federal subject: Altai Krai
- Administrative district: Kosikhinsky District
- SelsovietSelsoviet: Kosikhinsky Selsoviet
- Founded: 1751

Population (2010 Census)
  - Total: 5,229
  - Estimate (2021): 4,673 (−10.6%)

Administrative status
  - Capital of: Kosikhinsky District, Kosikhinsky Selsoviet

Municipal status
  - Municipal district: Kosikhinsky Municipal District
  - Rural settlement: Kosikhinsky Selsoviet Rural Settlement
  - Capital of: Kosikhinsky Municipal District, Kosikhinsky Selsoviet Rural Settlement
- Time zone: UTC+7 (MSK+4)
- Postal code: 659820
- OKTMO ID: 01618434101

Kosikha (Russian: Косиха) is a rural locality (a selo) and the administrative center of Kosikhinsky District of Altai Krai, Russia. Population: 5,229 (2010 census); 5,656 (2002 census); 5,266 (1989 Soviet census).
