= Fop Smit =

Dutch businessman (1777–1866)

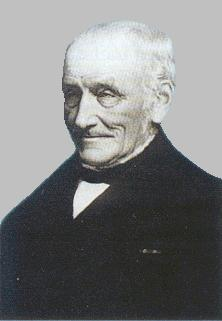
Fop Smit

Fop Smit (11 October 1777 – 25 August 1866) was a Dutch naval architect, shipbuilder, and shipowner. He founded the towage and salvage company L. Smit & Co that is now part of Smit International. His shipyard had a number of "firsts" in shipbuilding and produced a number of famous vessels.

== Family life ==
Smit was born in Alblasserdam, the son of Jan Foppe Smit and Marrijgje Ceele. He married Jannigje Pieterse Mak on 29 June 1806 in Alblasserdam.

== Business history ==
=== Partnership with his brother Jan ===
After the death of his father Jan (on whose yard he had worked before then as a shipwright) Fop Smit took over the management of the yard, together with his brother Jan in 1820. They built an early wooden river steamboat, Willem I, in 1825. This design (by the Frisian marine architect Van Loon) was so successful that they soon had orders for another five steamships. The association between the brothers ended in 1828.

=== Shipyard L. Smit en Zoon ===
Continuing alone, Fop Smit founded the shipbuilding company that would become known as Fop Smit shipyard, Etablissement Fop Smit, and after his death: L. Smit en Zoon. It received an order for the first Dutch seagoing steamship, The Batavier from the Nederlandsche Stoomboot Maatschappij in Rotterdam. This ship was launched in 1830. It plied the Rotterdam-London route. Smit built his first ocean-going ship, intended for the trade on the East Indies at his yard in Kinderdijk in 1838.

In 1847 Fop Smit yard built the first iron ship in the Netherlands, the brigantine Industrie. This was followed in 1853 by the first Dutch iron clipper ship California. This ship on its maiden voyage reached its destination Port Adelaide in Australia with British emigrants on board in 86 days under captain Jaski. The last ship Fop Smit laid down was the clipper Nestor. Smit also branched out to warship construction. His Kinderdijk yard in 1856 built two schooner-rigged screw-steam corvettes: Zr. Ms. Bali for the Dutch navy, and Kanrin Maru for the Japanese shōgun. The first screw-driven Japanese steam warship.

Fop Smit died in Nieuw-Lekkerland at age 89. His son Leendert Smit continued his Kinderdijk shipyard as L. Smit en Zoon. The Smit shipyard was one of the Dutch shipyards that eventually became part of the IHC Gusto Engineering and SBM Offshore marine and offshore engineering firms.

=== Towage service ===
On 6 November 1842 Smit contracted with 47 Rotterdam shipowners and maritime insurers to build a steam tug and station it in Hellevoetsluis for towage work. The tug Kinderdijk was launched on 31 August 1843 and put in service by December of that year. By the time of his death in 1866 the company owned nine paddle steamer tugboats. The company would later become L. Smit & Co (L. from his son Leendert), and then became part of Smit International.

=== Rederij Fop Smit & Co. ===
Fop Smit also founded the famous Rederij Fop Smit & Co. in 1878. This managed a very busy shipping line from Rotterdam via Dordrecht to Gorinchem.

== Ships ==
Koning Willem de Tweede was a cargo and passenger vessel built in the Smit shipyard in 8 December 1840, originally named Erfprinses van Oranje. It was wrecked off the South Australian coast in 1857.
