= Koning Willem de Tweede (ship) =

Dutch ship wrecked off South Australia in 1857

History

Netherlands
- Name: Koning Willem de Tweede or Koning Willem II
- Namesake: William II of the Netherlands
- Builder: Fop Smit
- Commissioned: 8 December 1840
- Stricken: 30 June 1857
- Fate: Wrecked, Guichen Bay, South Australia

General characteristics
- Tons burthen: 800
- Beam: 39 ft (12 m)
- Draft: 13 ft (4.0 m)

Koning Willem de Tweede, also known as Koning Willem II (English: King William II), was a Dutch passenger and cargo ship that was wrecked in Guichen Bay off the coast of Robe, South Australia, in 1857. The passengers, 400 Chinese migrants, had already disembarked, but 16 of the 25 crew drowned when trying to reach shore in a small boat.

== Construction ==
Koning Willem II was a 800-ton fully-rigged ship, constructed primarily of oak at Kinderdijk, South Holland, in Fop Smit's shipyard on 8 December 1840. It was 140 ft (43 m) long, with a beam of 39 ft (12 m) and a draft of 13 ft (4.0 m).

It was originally named Erfprinses van Oranje ("Crown Princess of Orange"), and was first recorded by Bureau Veritas in 1842 as being commanded by LCE van der Brugh. Initially owned by BJ Suermondt of Rotterdam, by 1842 it was registered in The Hague as being owned by Pieter Varkevisser. In 1849 its registration changed to the Port of Rotterdam.

It was 42 m (138 ft) long. There are no detailed documents showing its construction and design.

== Final voyage ==
Koning Willem II departed Hong Kong in early June 1857 under Captain Hindrik Remmelt Giezen, carrying around 400 Chinese migrants bound for the Victorian gold fields after disembarking at Robe. They chose to land in the colony of South Australia and then walk the 400 km (250 mi) to the gold fields (known as the "Robe Walk"), to avoid a £10 poll tax on arrivals to the colony of Victoria by sea, introduced by the Chinese Immigration Act in June 1855. Around 16,000 Chinese people arrived at Robe, mostly in 1857. The vessel was one of five or six Dutch commercial ships bringing Chinese migrants to the Australian colonies at the time, after the discovery of gold in Victoria in 1851, although most of the ships carrying the migrants to Robe were British or American.

After the passengers had safely disembarked, a storm blew up, and the ship began dragging anchor. On 30 June, its anchor was lost, and the ship's windlass was ripped off. Giezen tried to beach the ship in order to save it and its crew, but it was grounded on Long Beach around 5 km (3.1 mi) east of Robe, and started breaking up rapidly under heavy seas. Of the 25 crew, 16 were drowned as they were trying to get out of a small boat, which capsized in the surf. Giezen stayed on the wreck, eventually reaching shore on a cask after the wind changed direction and he was dragged to shore by people on the beach, using a rope. An Aboriginal man from Encounter Bay tried to swim out with a breeches buoy to establish a rescue line, but was unable to do so. The bodies of the drowned sailors were buried on the beach.

Giezen had a lawsuit brought against him in the 1860s, but it is unclear whether he remained in the colony.

== Wreck and salvage ==
Some months afterwards, the wreck was sold to a resident of Robe, Jacob Chambers, for £225. Much of the wreck was reported to be salvaged, including two cannons and a swivel gun, the figurehead, bell, and several doors and pieces of timber from the hull. The Caledonian Inn installed four of the ship's doors. A cannon which stands in front of the historic Customs House in Robe and the ship's bell used at the Robe Primary School from the late 1800s until the 21st century were reported as coming from Koning Willem de Tweede; However, later researchers raised doubts about both. The cannon's design resembles a British type, and may be from Sultana, another ship wrecked near Robe on 28 April 1857.

The Dutch Government approached Australian National Maritime Museum (ANMM) in Sydney before the 2020 COVID-19 pandemic, and, and along with the Silentworld Foundation, the SA Department for Environment and Water, and Flinders University, provided funding through the "Netherlands Shared Cultural Heritage Program" to locate the wreck. A team led by James Hunter, Curator of Naval Heritage and Archaeology in 2023 of the ANMM, made several trips to the site, starting in 2002. The potential significance of the wreck lies in the suddenness of its wrecking, making it likely that many artefacts could be recovered, revealing much detail about the crew and passengers, including the story of Chinese migrants through the South East of South Australia.

In May 2025 it was reported that the rest of the wreck of Koning Willem de Tweede had been located around 400 m (1,300 ft) off the beach in Robe, in fairly shallow water. The significant discovery was widely reported.
