= SS De Batavier =

Steamship

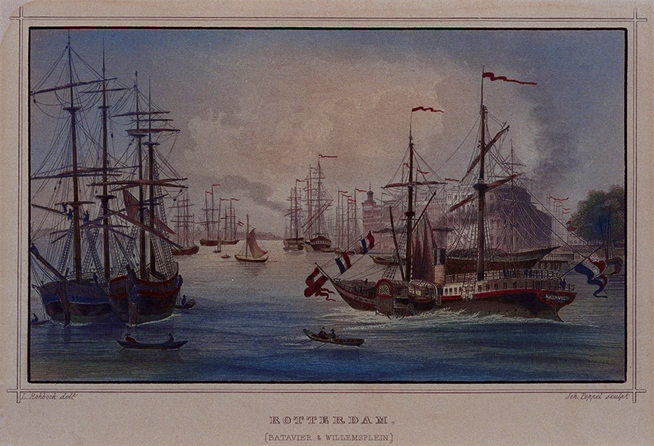
- De Batavier late in her career

History
- Name: De Batavier
- Builder: L. Smit en Zoon, Nieuw-Lekkerland, directed by Nederlandse Stoomboot Maatschappij, Rotterdam
- Laid down: 9 May 1825
- Launched: August 1827
- Fate: broken up 1856 or later

General characteristics
- Type: Paddle steamship
- Tonnage: 347 ton net; 750 Dutch tons
- Length: 51.60 m
- Beam: 5.88 m
- Depth of hold: 3.62 m
- Installed power: 200 hp (150 kW)
- Propulsion: 2 paddle wheels
- Sail plan: brig

SS De Batavier, launched in 1827 was an early steamship which served on the Rotterdam to London line of the Nederlandsche Stoomboot Maatschappij (NSM). As such she was in news quite often, but the Batavier also appeared in fiction and non-fiction. The Batavier is the location of a chapter of Thackeray's Vanity Fair.

== Ship characteristics ==
=== Ordering and construction ===
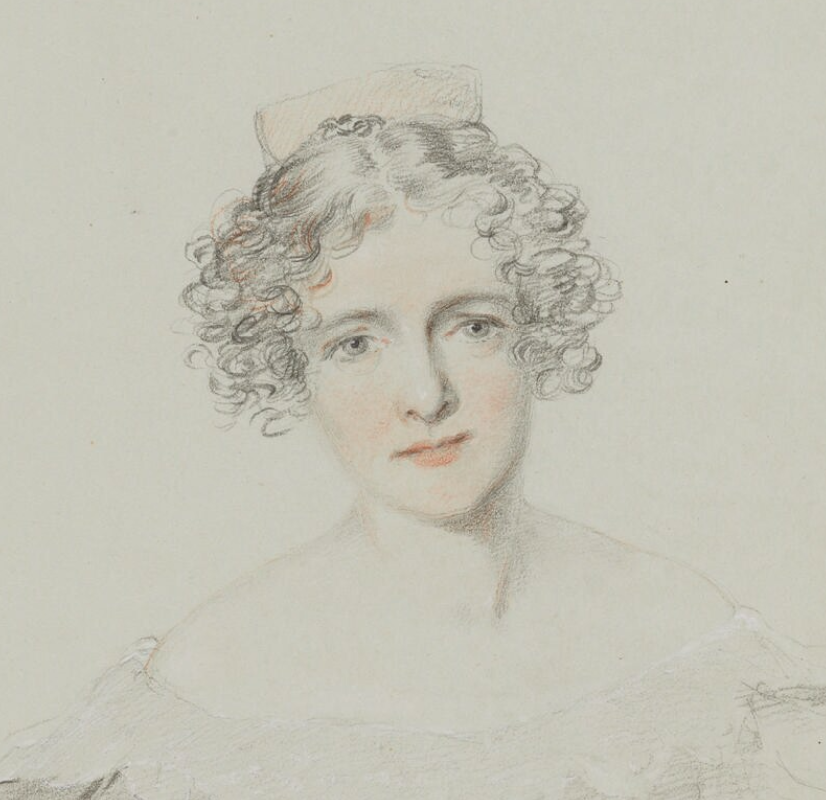
Anna Eliza Bray

The first plans of the Nederlandsche Stoomboot Maatschappij (NSM) centered on establishing lines between Rotterdam and Antwerp, between Rotterdam and Veere, and between Rotterdam and Nijmegen. For these plans it built De Nederlander, De Zeeuw, De Stad Antwerpen, and De Stad Nijmegen, all launched by Spring 1825. NSM then issued more shares to finance more plans, which were:

- A steamboat for the Rhine, the De Rijn
- A steamship (packet) for a line between Amsterdam and Hamburg (The Batavier)
- A tugboat for service on the rivers and close to sea (Hercules)
- A steamboat for a service between Antwerp and Boom

On 9 May 1825 the Batavier was laid down at L. Smit en Zoon in Nieuw Lekkerland, the shipyard of innovative shipbuilder Fop Smit. She was launched in August 1827.

=== Hull and engines ===
In 1833 the Batavier's measurements were given as length 186 Feet, beam 32 feet, depth of hold 16.5 feet. At the location of the main axis of the paddle wheel, the hull proper was only 24 feet wide. In Amsterdam feet of 0.283133 m, this translates 52.66 by 9.06 by 4.672 m. This contrasts with the measurements given in 1856.

The configuration of the hull was given as having a flush deck and (from stern to bow): pavilion, large cabin, hold, engine room, front cabin and fore ship. The English novelist Anna Eliza Bray wrote: The Batavier was originally built for a brig, not for a steamer; consequently it was but a make-shift, when converted from a vessel intended to go by sails only into one that was to be boiled through the water by an engine, for which it had not regular accommodation. There was, therefore, no deck for the passengers, excepting a confined spot, so called, on the roof of the cabin, to which you were obliged to ascend by a flight of steps. It is known that her claim that the Batavier was a converted ship was not correct. However, the description fits the depiction of the Batavier on the later etching 'Rotterdam (Batavier & Willemsplein)', which shows a steam vessel with heavy masts, and a complete brig sail plan with spars on the main mast. Another remarkable aspect of this etching is the raised bow and stern. An 1835 letter refers to this feature of the Batavier.

The engines of Batavier were two low-pressure steam engines of the biggest kind then in use in any country. These were built by the Cockerill factory of James and John Cockerill.

== Early service (1829-1833) ==
=== Too late for Hamburg ===
Construction of the Batavier went much slower than planned. When she was laid down, she was planned to be taken into service between Amsterdam and Hamburg in 1826. However the Amsterdam merchants did not like the prospect of the Rotterdam NSM owning the steam shipping lines from Amsterdam. They therefore supported the foundation of the Amsterdamsche Stoomboot Maatschappij (ASM). ASM then bought a steamship in the United Kingdom, and called her De Onderneming. Already in July 1825 she arrived in Hamburg. In August 1826 the Beurs van Amsterdam and Willem de Eerste followed.

When the Batavier was launched in 1827, the prospects for using her between Amsterdam and Hamburg were not good. Already during construction, NSM started to negotiate with the Dutch, French and Russian governments about selling the Batavier. When these negotiations came to nothing, NSM decided to use the Batavier between Antwerp and London. Shortly before, the Batavier towed the ocean liner Atlas, reputedly twice her size, from Fijenoord to Hellevoetsluis.

=== Failure of Antwerp - London line ===
The first trip from Antwerp to London was planned to take place on 19 September 1829. The schedule had a trip from Antwerp to London on Tuesday and the return trip from London on Saturday. The Batavier captain J.H. Gieze was indeed observed passing Vlissingen on her first trip. On her second trip she arrived back in Antwerp on 5 October, with leaks and damage to her machines. She was expected to go to Rotterdam using her sails to get this fixed. Anyway, significant changes to the machines were required, and so the line between London and Antwerp had ended.

=== Start of the Rotterdam - London line ===
On 12 April 1830 the Batavier started the what was later known as the Batavier Line, a regular service between Rotterdam and London. According to the initial schedule, she would sail from Rotterdam on each Sunday, and back from London on Saturday, perhaps influenced by the prevailing winds. She would take passengers, horses, carriages, and freight. Her captain was David Dunlop. On 20 April Batavier made an impression by departing Rotterdam during a fierce northwest storm, and still arriving on the Thames 25 hours later, despite the very strong contrary winds.

=== The Belgian Revolution ===
The Belgian Revolution (25 August 1830 - 21 July 1831) at first did not affect the service of the Batavier. During the winter of 1830-1831 the number of sleeping places on board was increased to over 100, and two more dining rooms were added. On 1 March 1831 the Batavier left Rotterdam for London, and took up her schedule. In April 1831 she brought in a cargo of 19,000 pound Sterling in gold, 497 bars of iron and other things. Gold and iron appear more often in cargo lists of the Batavier. During the Ten days' campaign from 2 to 12 August 1831, the Batavier sailed to London according to schedule on 8 August.

By early 1832 the conflict was kind of frozen, with the Dutch still holding the Antwerp Citadel. In February the Batavier was quarantined on the Meuse after she brought the news about the 1826–1837 cholera pandemic in London. The quarantine became regular in these months, but the service was not interrupted. In mid June 1832 one of the engineers died on board at the quarantine place before the island Tiengemeten, but this was not caused by the disease.

=== Government service ===
In late 1832 France and England wanted to force the Dutch out of the Antwerp Citadel. They therefore planned a blockade of the Dutch coast. If that did not help, France would intervene militarily to capture Antwerp. The Dutch king's negative reply to the Anglo-French ultimatum probably reached London only on 4 or 5 November. Even before that, the non-arrival of the Batavier in London caused some concern on the London Exchange. The report was that she was held back, and had let her English sailors go. The Batavier was then requisitioned and armed by the Dutch government, and sent to Hellevoetsluis. Here she was to guard the coast, and help to tow in Dutch merchant ships. On 7 December 1832 the Batavier was at Hellevoetsluis commanded by Lieutenant Galup. She succeeded in bringing in Piet Hein of Capt. J. Turnbull from Surinam, and the brig De Hollander of Captain M. Booijsen from Rio de Janeiro.

Meanwhile, the conflict with Belgium was decided by the French army winning the Siege of Antwerp on 23 December, but that did end the conflict, nor the blockade. The Batavier continued in government service, bringing negotiators to London, as well as the Dutch ratification 21 May preliminary treaty with England and France which lifted the blockade. After collecting General Chassé from his prison in Dunkirk, the Batavier was handed back to the NSM in late June 1833.

== Regular service between Rotterdam and London (1833-1855) ==
=== Packet Boat ===
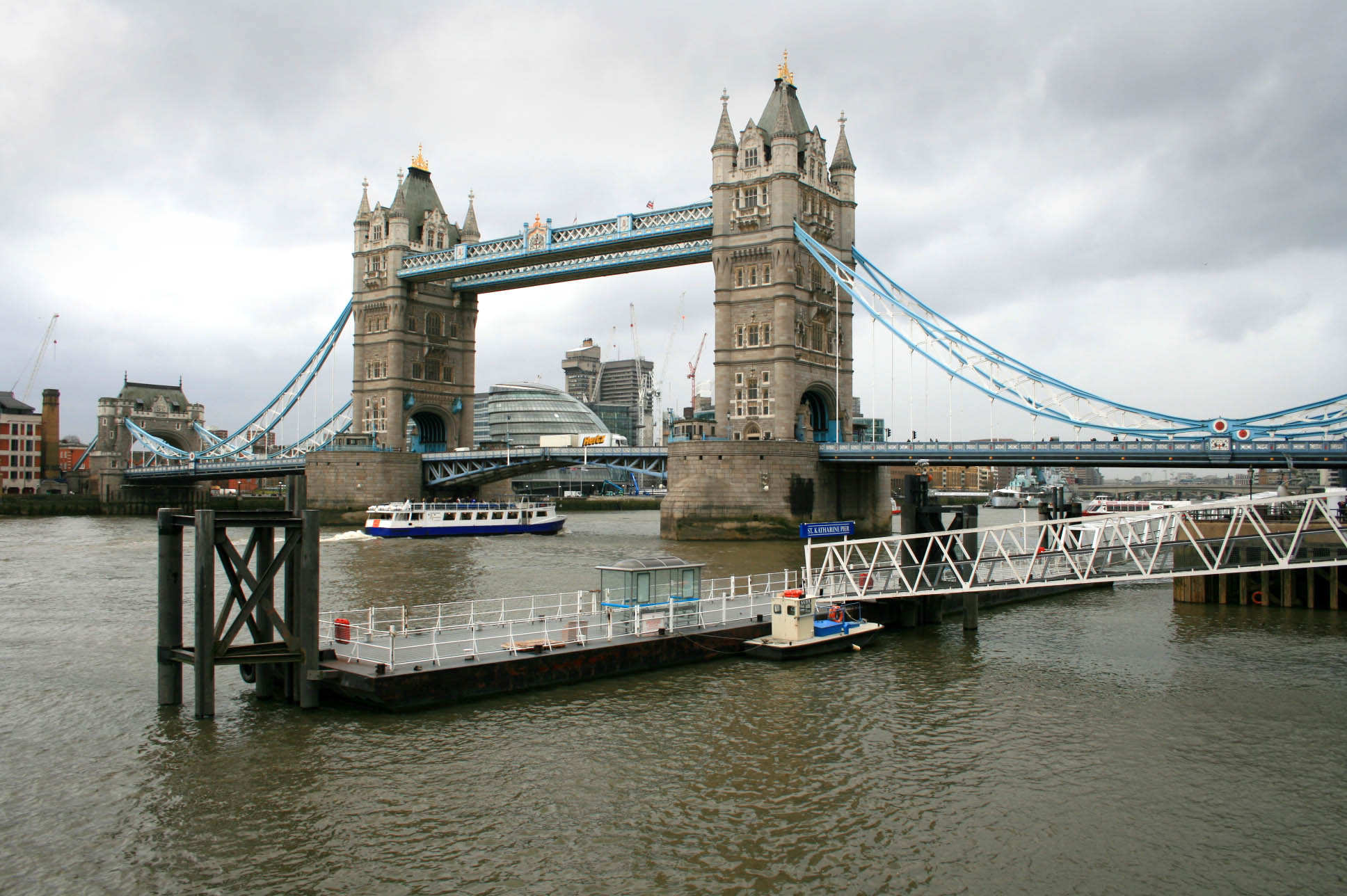
St Katharine pier

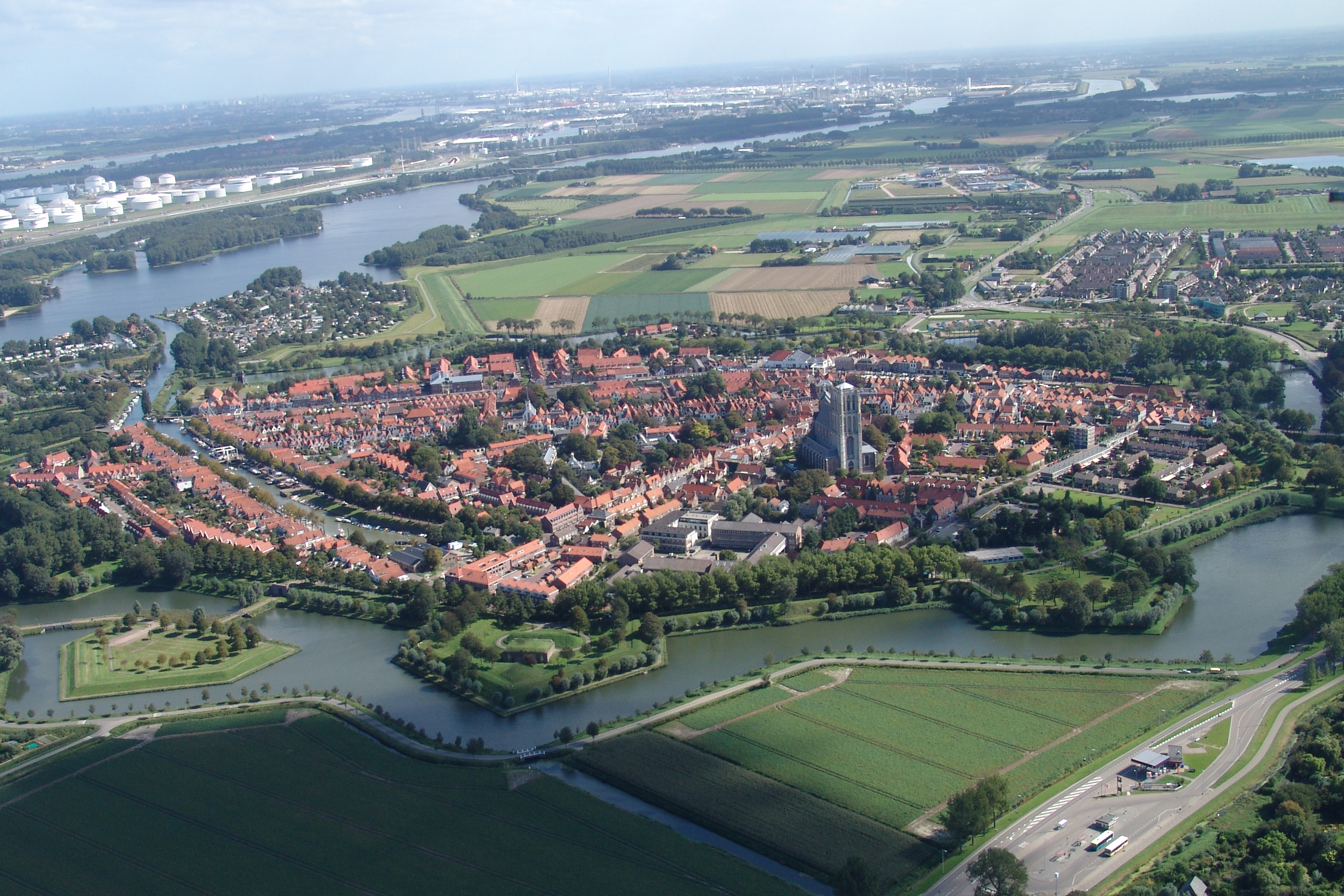
The Batavier regularly waited for the tide at Brielle

On 6 August 1833 the Batavier resumed her commercial service to London. She was one of the few steam packets which carried mail between London and Rotterdam. It meant that commercial and diplomatic communication relied on her sailing according to schedule.

=== Route ===
When the Batavier steamed to London, the shortest route from Rotterdam was over the Nieuwe Maas. At the time, the Nieuwe Maas still flowed to sea passing just north of Brielle. In 1949 the stretch from Vlaardingen to the sea, known as Brielse Maas was dammed off, and became the Brielse Meer. So, the usual route of the Batavier from Rotterdam was: Nieuwe Maas, Botlek, Brielse Meer, open sea. An alternative short route was over Het Scheur instead of the Brielse Maas and Botlek, but the Batavier seems to have used this short route only during her first year of service.

In 1829, the Voorne Canal was completed. It connected Hellevoetsluis to the Nieuwe Maas east of Brielle, and was an alternative route for the Batavier if the water level in the Nieuwe Maas was too low. A now less obvious reason that often made Hellevoetsluis the start and endpoint for the Batavier was that at the time, the Dutch rivers froze up almost every winter, and also for very prolonged periods. An even less usual route for the Batavier was a detour over Dordrecht, but this was a rare event, see below.

In London, the Batavier had a mooring place just east of the Tower of London at a place called St Katherine's Wharf on the Thames. This is just south of St Katharine Docks. St Katharine Pier is on the same stretch of the Thames. At the time the Tower Bridge did not exist.

=== Favorite ship ===
The Batavier was the vessel of choice for many people, and even for foreign royalty. This might be because she had a reputation for reliability. E.g. from 31 August 1833 till the first days of September, there was a heavy storm between London and Rotterdam. On 31 August she was the only steamship to successfully leave the Thames. She then arrived in Rotterdam one day before the Sir Edward Banks, which had left a day earlier. On the return trip from Rotterdam she again sailed through the storm that prevented the steamships Arlequin, Attwood and London Merchant from leaving Rotterdam according to schedule. Arlequin and Attwood finally arrived with substantial delays and much damage and London Merchant arrived 10 days late. NSM generated a lot of publicity from these events.

An inadvertent example of why the Batavier was so popular was given by the same Anna Eliza Bray who claimed that she was a converted brig. After first noting that the Batavier was much more expensive and very far inferior to an English ship, she speaks of an 'unusually rapid' passage. Indeed, in 1836 prices for passage on the Batavier were given as 3 GBP, and that on ships of the General Steam Navigation Company as 2 GBP 2 shilling for the best place. In about 1840 William Jesse was as complimentary: Of the many steamers, ships, and tubs I had rolled in, this vessel struck me as being decidedly the most uncomfortable. She was dirty, and redolent of stinks; schnappes, bad tobacco, and bilge-water, being the prevailing odours..., but amongst her numerous deficiencies, she had one good qualification, the principal one, she was safe.

=== Voyage to San Sebastian ===
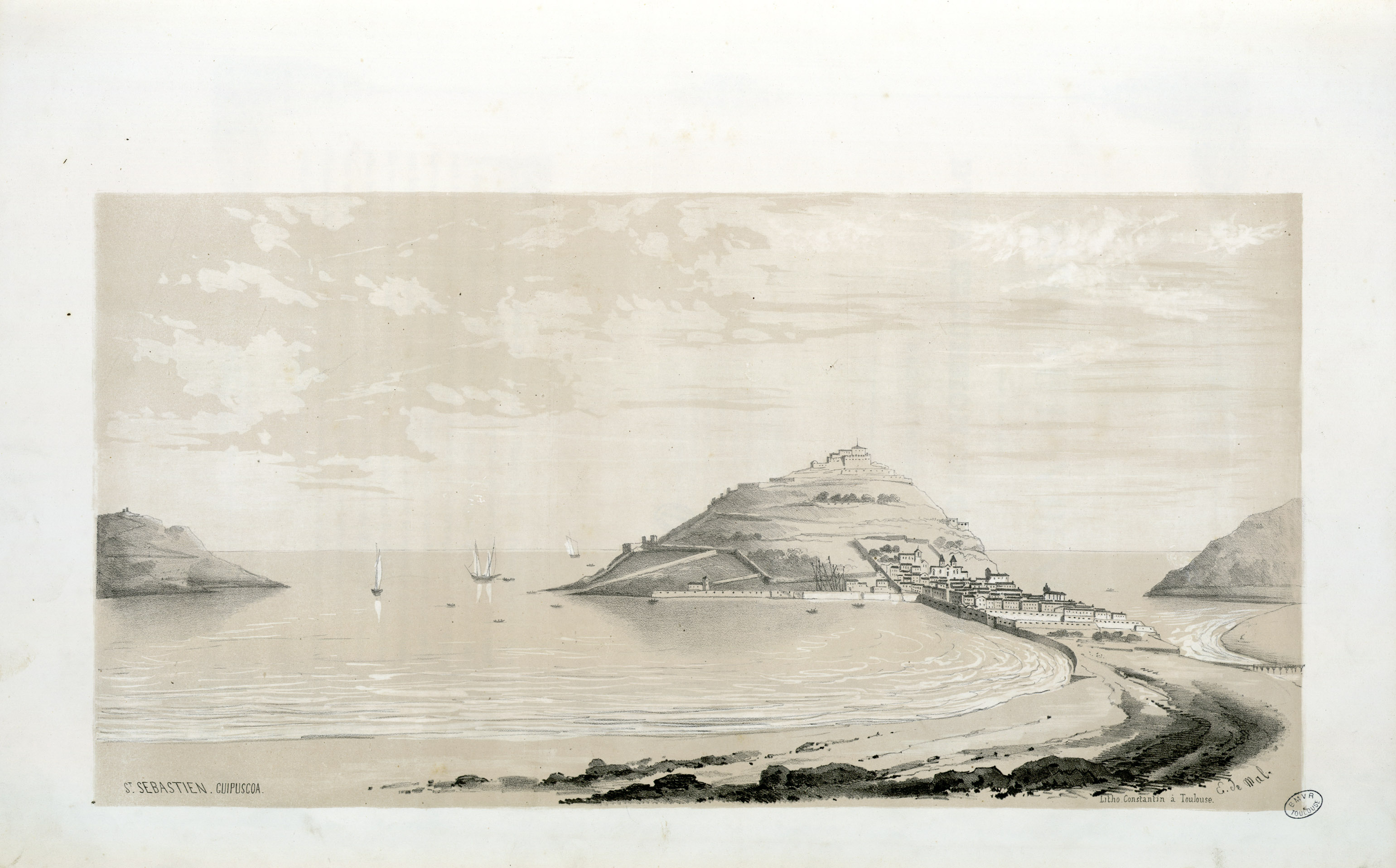
San Sebastian in 1843

Antoine, Duke of Montpensier (1824–1890) was the youngest son of the French king Louis Philippe I, who was deposed in the 22–24 February French Revolution of 1848. The Duke of Montpensier was married to Luisa Fernanda, heir presumptive of the crown of Spain. On 28 February 1848 she arrived in England in disguise on board the steamship Saumarez. The duke arrived from Jersey a few days later. The Spanish court reacted by sending an agent that was to bring the couple to Spain. By 17 March a rumor that the couple had arrived in San Sebastián by steamship circulated in Madrid.

The duke and duchess suddenly left London for Belgium in mid-March. The plan was that they would go to Spain on board the Spanish steamship Tridente, but she was caught up in a storm while going from London to Vlissingen, and was forced to enter the roadstead of Texel. Meanwhile, the couple remained incognito, but on 28 March it became public, that both had arrived in Rotterdam a few days ago, and that they had chartered the Batavier to bring them to Spain. On 28 March the Batavier wat at sea, steaming to Spain. On 2 April the Batavier arrived in San Sebastián. On 9 April the Batavier captain D. Dunlop arrived back in Brielle from San Sebastian. Meanwhile, the competition of the Batavier seems to have reacted to her absence by temporarily increasing prices.

=== Engine trouble at sea and sailing capabilities ===
On 8 May 1853 at noon, the Batavier left London with a small cargo and 18 passengers. At about 7 pm she was near the Tongue Light. At about 9 pm the main shaft of her engines broke. She then used her sails for about one and a half hour. Her master also made signals, and she was seen by the steamship Ravensbourne, who took her in tow. When the captain of the Batavier noted that the towage damaged the machinery, because the floats of the paddle wheels had not been taken off, he had her cast her off about 15 miles from North Foreland.

Ravensbourne alerted the tug Thomas Petley, who came to the Batavier's assistance. The master of the tug agreed to the unusual request to tow the Batavier over to Holland. This could be done because the Batavier supplied the tug with enough coal for the round trip. In the morning of 10 May 1853, the Batavier captain W. Smith arrived in Hellevoetsluis towed by Thomas Petley captain T.H. Porter. The owners of the Batavier tendered 175 pounds for this service, which was rejected.

In court the owners of Thomas Petley argued that they had saved the Batavier from disaster and demanded 1,500 pounds, about half of the value of the Batavier. The owners of the Batavier argued that there had not been any danger, and that during the greater part of the voyage she had actually sailed faster than the tug could steam. The judgement of the Admiralty court centered on whether the Batavier was in danger when Thomas Petley assisted her. Captain Bacon of Ravensbourne stated that when he left her, the Batavier was in perfect safety. He also stated that the Batavier possessed very good sailing qualities, enabling her to sail the distance in 15-18 hours with a favorable wind. In combination with other circumstances, like the time of the year, and the weather, the judge concluded that the Batavier had not been in danger, and that the sole reason to engage the tug was in guarding the credit of the service.

== The end ==
=== The Batavier becomes obsolete ===
By 1850, the Batavier was an old ship. She transported less passengers. In part, because these preferred to travel via Belgium, and its railroads, but also because the Batavier was by then slower than its competitors. The manager of NSM stated that there was probably no other ship which had performed so well, but that she was now outdated, and her glory years were over. She was also expensive for NSM, because she often required expensive repairs, and her draft made that she often had to go via Hellevoetsluis.

In 1850, the NSM employed the screw schooner Fijenoord as second ship on the Batavier line. That year NSM's manager declared that the repairs required to keep the Batavier in service for the long term would cost 25% of the construction of a completely new Batavier, which was estimated at 185,000 guilders. He therefore strongly advised to build a new Batavier.

On 11 February 1854, NSM finally laid down a new Batavier at Fijenoord. The new Batavier was launched on 28 March 1855. In mid-August 1855, the new Batavier made its first trip to London.

=== Hulked and scrapped ===
After she was replaced, the old Batavier first became a coal hulk in Rotterdam. In 1856, she was auctioned on 22 April. She brought in 16,600 guilders. She was subsequently scrapped, because on 19 May, Mr J. Duppe in Dordrecht offered the engines for sale.

== In culture ==
=== Fiction ===
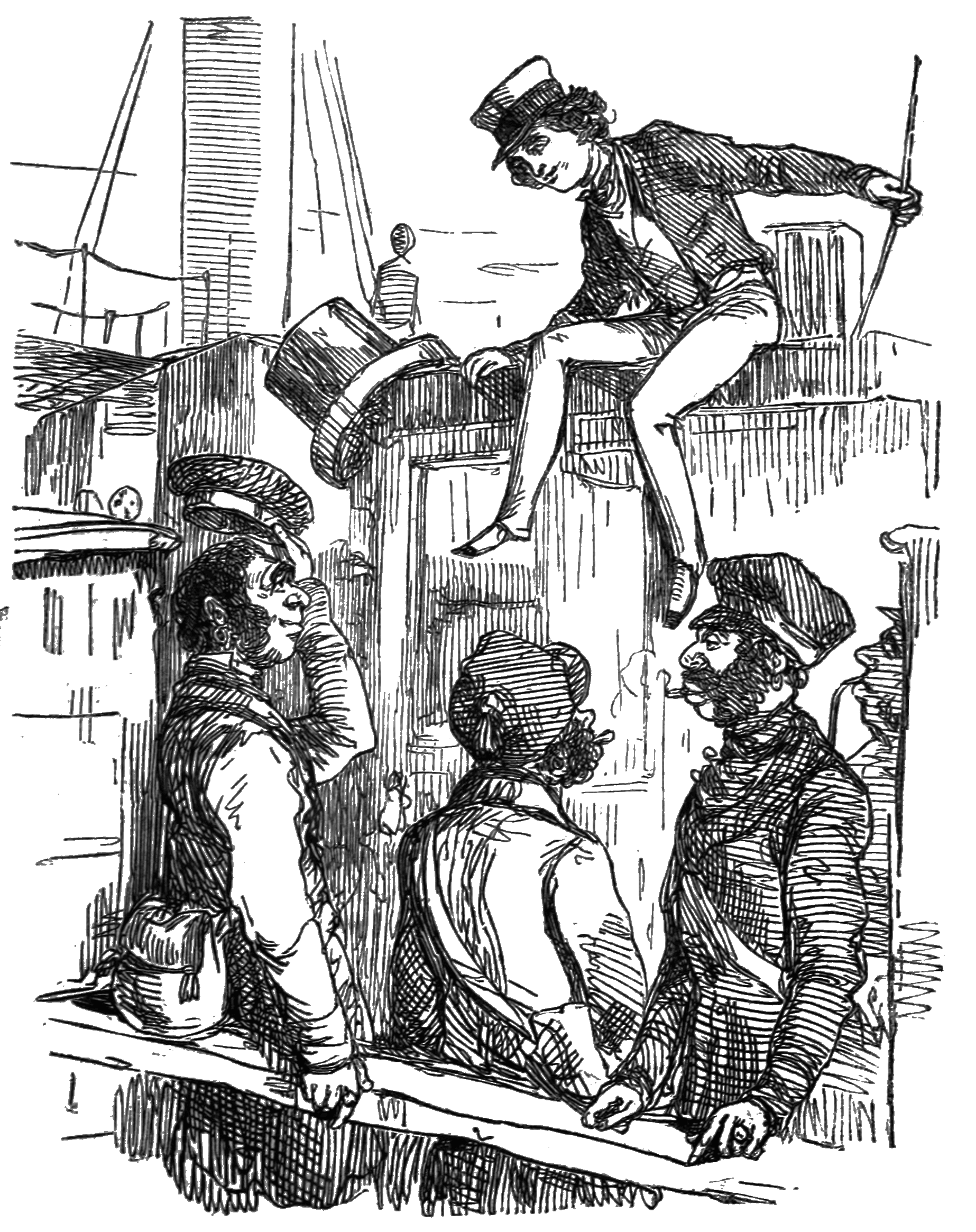
On top of a coach on board the Batavier by Thackeray

In Thackeray's Vanity Fair (1848), Chapter XXVII 'Am Rhein' starts on board the Batavier. The chapter paints a satirical picture of English society going on holiday to the Rhine. They bring along their families, servants, carriages, an enormous of luggage and so on. Thackeray added drawings of a man in the cabin of the Batavier, and of a young man sitting on top of one of the many coaches. It is not known whether Thackeray drew this whilst visiting the Batavier, or was inspired by actually being on board sometime.

=== Non-fiction ===
In The life of Mrs. Sherwood, chiefly autobiographical with extracts from Mr Sherwood's journal, Mary Martha Sherwood (1775–1851) describes her trip to the continent. In June 1832 she returned to England. After the steamboat Prins Frederik had brought Mrs. Sherwood downstream to Rotterdam, the steamboat made another trip which brought the dying Walter Scott to the Batavier. He was brought on board the Batavier lying in a barouche and was later brought to his cabin in a chair. On 12 June the Batavier left for London. During the trip, Sir Walter woke and asked for a pen and ink. Mrs. Sherwood was asked, and had the pleasure of handing him the ones she was using.

At first glance, Mrs. Sherwood seems to give a very confusing account, because she has the Batavier attached to a wooden pier at a beach. She also writes about a steamboat bringing her from Rotterdam to the Batavier, but as Batavier was supposed to sail from Rotterdam this would be unnecessary. The above-mentioned cholera epidemic explains the events. By June 1832 the trips of the Batavier were cut up due to quarantine measures. According to a changed schedule, on 12 June she would first steam from Rotterdam to Hellevoetsluis at 6 am, and then from Hellevoetsluis to London at 2 pm. The return trip from London would go no further than Hellevoetsluis and quarantine. However, when the Batavier arrived from London in the morning of the 11th, she first had to go in quarantine near Tiengemeten, about 15 km east of Hellevoetsluis. In the afternoon of 12 June the Batavier then left Hellevoetsluis according to schedule. Obviously the NSM had let the steamboat Prins Frederik continue her downstream trip from Nijmegen to pick up the 6 am passengers from Rotterdam to Hellevoetsluis, which also explains that on 12 June Sir Walter Scott passed Rotterdam in order to embark on the Batavier. The wooden pier at a beach then might be sought anywhere between Tiengemeten and Hellevoetsluis.

The Rhenish Album (1836) was probably a work somewhere in between fiction and non-fiction. It gave all kinds of supposedly reliable travel information about travel in the area, like distances, objects of interest, and prices, e.g. that passage from London to Rotterdam on the Batavier in the chief cabin cost 3 GBP, and on the ships of the General Steam Company 2 GBP 2 Shilling. It also had an extensive list of the author's expenses on his trip. This trip started on board the Batavier in July 1835. She lay opposite the Wapping stairs. The author described her as: a large, black-looking, rounded whale of a vessel. A comfortable cabin on deck and a platform on the roof of it, completed her odd appearance. A whale without its good looks, but not withstanding her black looks, a very fine vessel. An elaborate description is given of the passage, and especially of the fellow passengers. The Batavier then arrived on the Dutch coast, but had to steam to Hellevoetsluis, because there was not enough water in the Brielse Maas before Brielle. Despite the detour, the Batavier was in Rotterdam at 1 pm.

In 1847 Hans Christian Andersen made a tour of western Europe. In the Hague he got a grand welcome, but also a letter from his friend the younger duke of Saxe-Weimar-Eisenach (1818–1901). It made that Andersen hastened his voyage to England, and boarded the Batavier on 22 June at 10 am. Andersen described the Batavier as 'One of the oldest Dutch steamboats, a true steam snail'. She was heavily laden. high up the railing there were big baskets with cherries. On the deck there was a great number of emigrants to America. After eight hours, the Batavier reached open sea. At the mouth of the Thames, Andersen was struck by the huge number of boats. He landed at the custom-house. At the time Andersen was so famous, that he was immediately received by the London society.

In 1854 the Dutchman Samuel van den Bergh made a trip to England on board the Batavier, and wrote enthusiastically about her. Van den Bergh stayed on deck until the Batavier reached Brielle, where she would wait for the tide. After a rich dinner with champagne, Van den Bergh and his companions seated themselves on the chests of the paddle-wheels until nightfall. There were about 200 emigrants on board, many of them camped on deck. After one of these went overboard, Van den Bergh spent a restless night. In the morning he awoke to the scene of many ships sailing at the entrance of the Thames. At Gravesend the Batavier halted to take the pilot and customs officers on board. In passing Van den Bergh marveled about the Royal Arsenal of Woolwich and the wet docks, before arriving at the quay of St Katherine's Wharf, close to the Tower of London. On the return trip Van den Bergh was rowed to the ship the night before she left. The crossing was uneventful, and Van den Bergh expected to awake near Brielle in the morning. To his surprise this became the Dordtsche Kil, where lack of water had forced the Batavier to steam. On a huge detour he next saw Dordrecht, the Oude Maas, Vlaardingen, Schiedam, and finally Rotterdam.
