= Zwarte Zee =

Royal Netherlands Navy Auxiliary

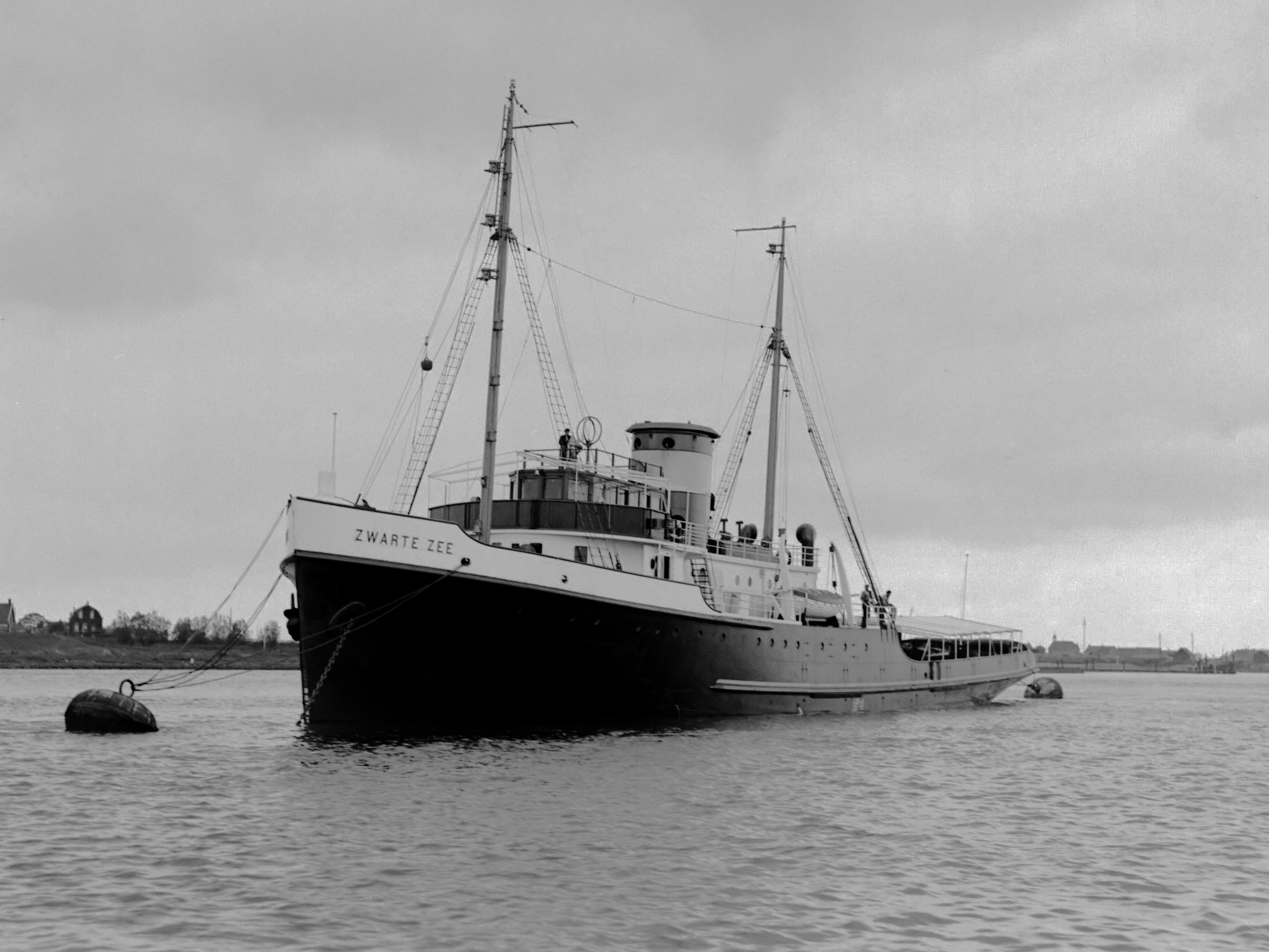
- Zwarte Zee shortly after its launch

History

Netherlands
- Name: Zwarte Zee
- Builder: L. Smit en Zoon, Kinderdijk
- Laid down: 1932
- Launched: 2 June 1933
- Commissioned: 3 October 1933 as a commercial vessel; 10 May 1940 Royal Netherlands Navy
- Out of service: 27 October 1966
- Renamed: Zwarte Zee III (1961-1962); Ierse Zee (1962-1966)
- Fate: Scrapped at Frank Rijsdijk, Hendrik-Ido-Ambacht

General characteristics
- Type: Tugboat, Rescue tug
- Displacement: 793 t (780 long tons) standard At launch; 836 t (823 long tons) standard During World War II
- Length: 63.35 m (207 ft 10 in)
- Beam: 9.81 m (32 ft 2 in)
- Draught: 6 m (19 ft 8 in)
- Installed power: 4,200 hp (3,100 kW)
- Propulsion: 2 × Werkspoor 4-stroke 6-cylinder diesel engines powering 1 shaft each
- Speed: 17.5 knots (32.4 km/h; 20.1 mph)
- Armament: During World War II: 1 × single British 76.2 mm (3.00 in) 12-pounder gun; 1 × twin 20 mm (0.79 in) Oerlikon cannon

Zwarte Zee was the largest and most powerful tugboat in the world from the moment of its launch until the tugboat Clyde was launched in 1957, over two decades later. It was also the first tug powered by diesel engines as opposed to steam-powered engines.

Designed to be able to quickly help ships during an emergency, the Zwarte Zee had a substantial high speed for a tug at 17.5 knots (32.4 km/h; 20.1 mph). The ship's maiden voyage was held on 3 October 1933 with Princess Juliana as one of the passengers on board.

== Service history ==
=== Second World War ===
When the Second World War broke out for the Netherlands on 10 May 1940, the Zwarte Zee was requisitioned by the Royal Netherlands Navy. Zwarte Zee was tasked with evacuating the unfinished destroyers Isaac Sweers and Philips van Almonde from Vlissingen to The Downs in England. However, Philips van Almonde was unable to launch from its stocks and was scuttled on the slipway instead, leaving Zwarte Zee with just the Isaac Sweers to be towed.

On 20 August 1940 the Zwarte Zee was hit during a bombing raid on Falmouth causing it to capsize. The ship was salvaged and towed to a dry dock where it was repaired. Zwarte Zee would also be painted over in full grey naval colors and receive some anti-air armament to defend from future air attacks. During the repairs, one sailor became entangled in a steel cable during the salvage operation and lost his life.

From February 1941 until the end of the war, Zwarte Zee served in the Rescue Tug Section of the British Admiralty with the pennant number W 163. In this role, the ship rescued over 150,000 GRT of shipping. During the war, the tug frequently visited American ports. Inspired by the size and power of the design, the V4-M-A1 tugboat design was based on Zwarte Zee. These tugboats were all managed by the Moran Towing and Transportation Corporation, which after the war attempted to break the Dutch dominance in ocean towing.

=== Postwar ===
In 1945, the Zwarte Zee returned to Smit. In 1948, the ship was partially rebuilt, with modifications made to the stern. On 31 December 1951, the ship was severely damaged in a collision with the Danish vessel Bjørn Clausen and had to be towed to Saint-Nazaire. On 11 January, the Zwarte Zee arrived at Rotterdam, where it was repaired.

In 1961, the ship was renamed Zwarte Zee III, as a new Zwarte Zee, the fourth of this name, had entered service. In early 1962, it was renamed again, this time to Ierse Zee. On 27 October 1966, the ship was towed by the tugs Kinderdijk and Kijkduin to N.V. Frank Rijsdijk's Industrial Enterprises in Hendrik-Ido-Ambacht to be scrapped. During this "farewell voyage," the ship was slowly sailed along the Nieuwe Maas through the port of Rotterdam, allowing many people along the shore to watch the ship's transit.
