= L. Smit en Zoon =

Dutch shipbuilding company (1791–1965)

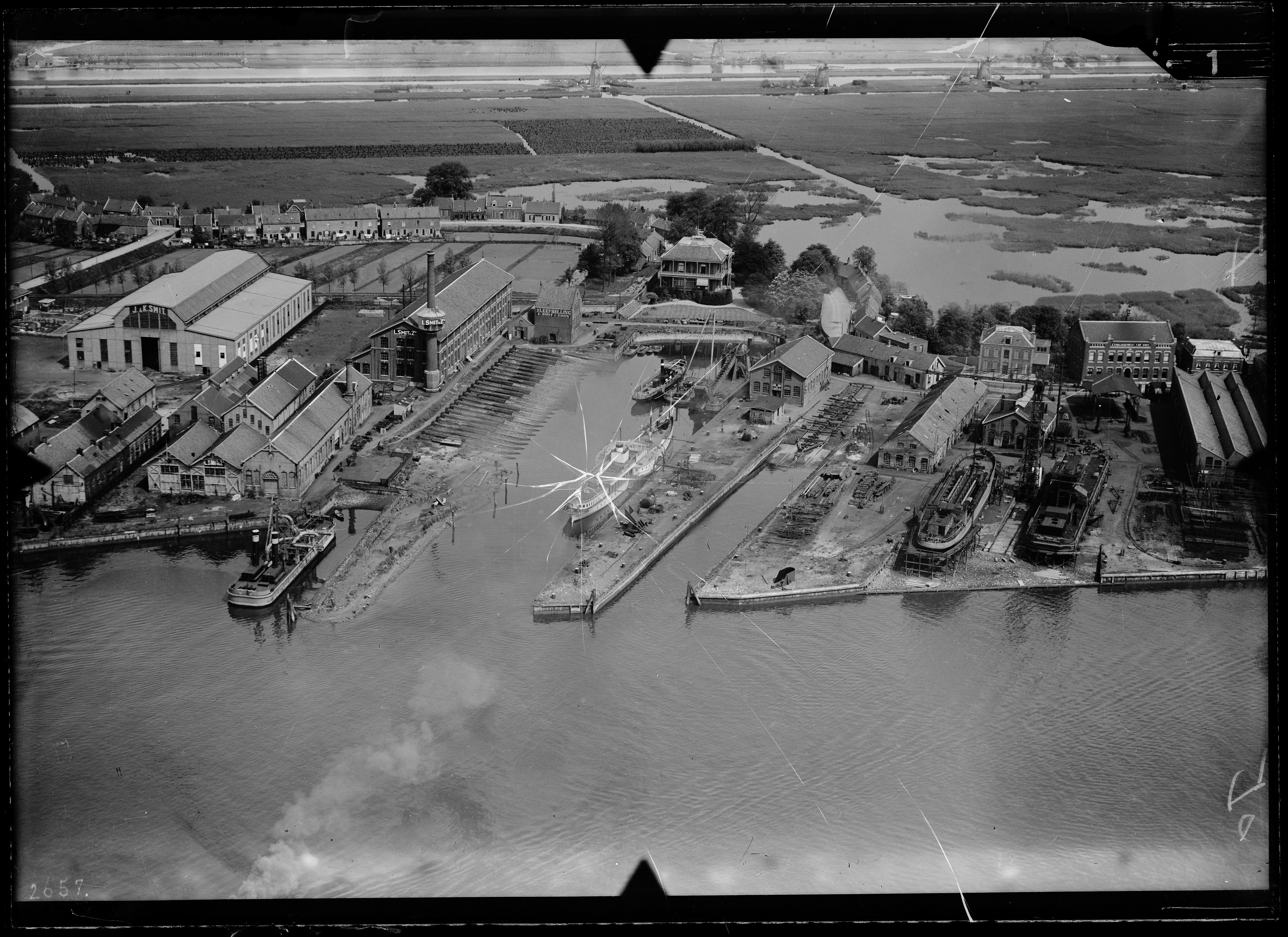
- Shipyard L. Smit to the right of J. & K. Smitd
- Industry: Shipbuilding
- Founded: 1791
- Fate: Merged into IHC Holland in 1965
- Headquarters: Kinderdijk, Netherlands
- Key people: Fop Smit, L. Smit
- Products: Dredging vessels, Inland navigation ships

L. Smit en Zoon previously known as Fop Smit, was a Dutch shipbuilding company located in Kinderdijk. Its successor is now part of Royal IHC.

== Context ==
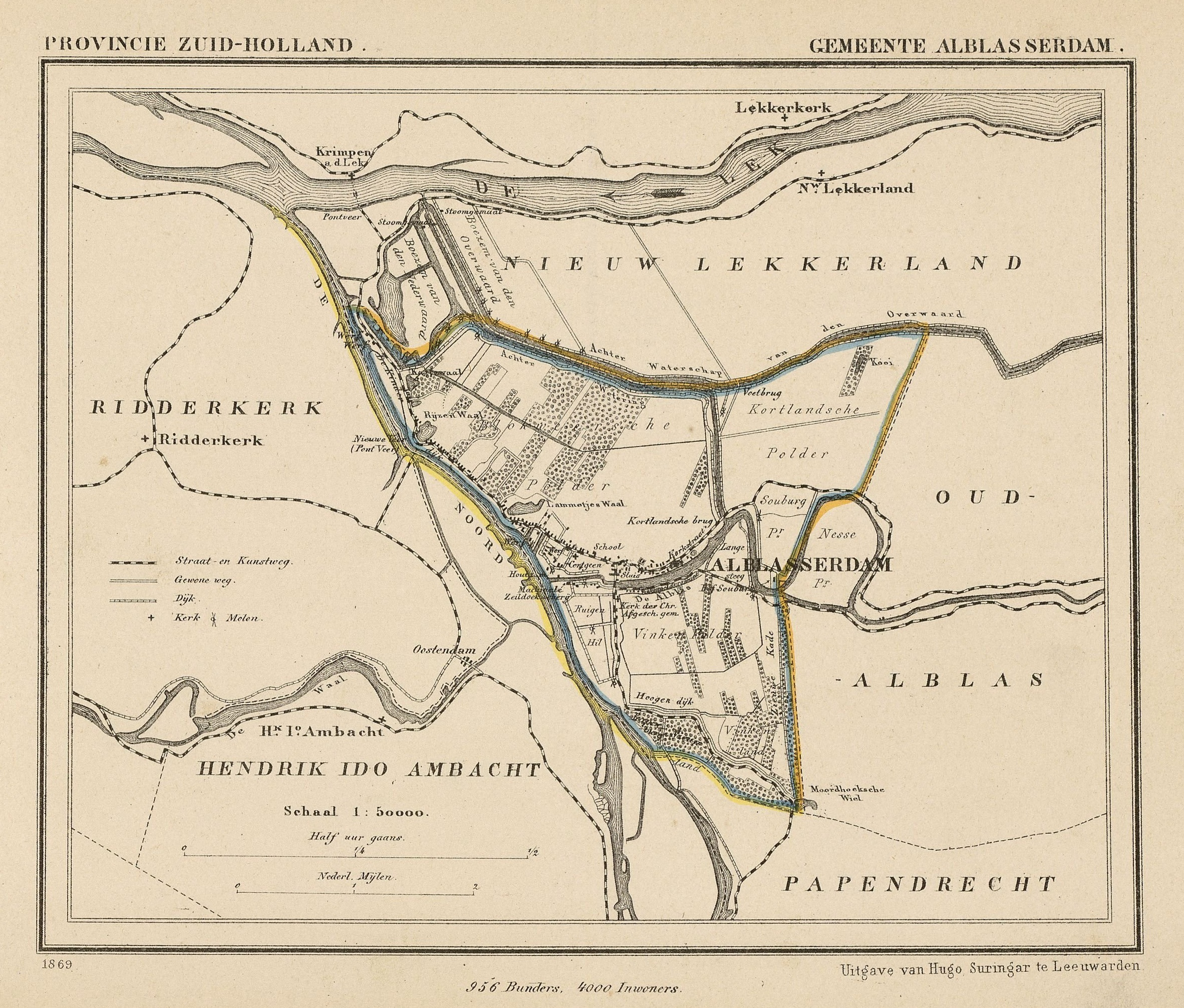
Kinderdijk location near Nieuw-Lekkerland

L. Smit en Zoon shipyard was one of multiple shipyards belonging to the Smit family. In 1785 Jan Smit Fopszoon (1742–1807) and his brother Jacques Smit Fopszoon (1756–1820) took over a shipyard in Alblasserdam, near the border with Nieuw-Lekkerland.

After they were established, Jacques built another shipyard west of the one they had, at the terrain later known as that of L. Smit en Zoon. Jan Smit Fopszoon was very successful in building a small type of vessel, the hoogaars On his death, Jan Smit Fopszoon was wealthy. He had two shipyards, several houses, 18 hectares of land multiple (parts in) ships, as well as many securities. With Marrigje Ceelen (1747–1820) he had three sons and two daughters:

- Fop Smit (1777–1866)
- Jan Smit (1779–1869) inherited his father's shipyard in Alblasserdam, and worked in partnership with Fop from 1824 to 1828, his sons founded J. & K. Smit
- Cornelis Smit (1784–1858) Founded his own shipyards Jan Smit Czn. near the harbor of Alblasserdam and in Zierikzee, and had a patent slip in Papendrecht.

Fop Smit, or more exactly Fop Smit Janszoon (11 October 1777 – 25 August 1866) took over the shipyard of his uncle Jacques Smit Fopszoon, and thus founded the shipyard Fop Smit, later known as L. Smit en Zoon.

Fop Smit married Jannigje Mak (1776–1852) and had:

- Pieter Smit (1808–1863), father of Pieter Smit Jr. (1848–1913)
- Jan Smit (1811–1875), father of Jan Smit V (1837- ?) and Arie Smit (1845–1925)
- Leendert Smit (1813–1893)
- Fop Smit Jr. (1815–1892)

Jan Smit a.k.a. Jan Smit Fopszoon would later lead a shipyard at Slikkerveer, which was probably split off from Fop Smit's shipyard. He would be succeeded by his son Arie Smit.

Leendert Smit continued to work at his father's shipyard, and would continue it as L. Smit en Zoon. He would be joined by his nephew Jan Smit V, who had married his daughter Jannetje Johanna (1838-?).

== History as Fop Smit's shipyard ==
=== Separate shipyards of Jan and Foppe ===
From 1807 to 1820 Jan Smit Fopszoon's second son Jan Smit and his mother continued his shipyard, which had about 10 employees. Afterwards Jan continued alone. Meanwhile, Fop acquired the shipyard of Jacques Smit Fopszoon (1756–1820). Until 1824 the shipyards of Fop Smit and Jan Smit continued to build only built small vessels.

=== United shipyards of Fop and Jan ===
In 1824 Jan Smit contracted to build the paddle steamer Willem de Eerste for a shipping line between Rotterdam and Nijmegen. The engines were made by Billard in Jemappes. It was probably on account of this project that Fop and Jan entered into a partnership.

On 9 May 1825 the first Batavier was laid down by Fop Smit for an Amsterdam Hamburg line managed by the Nederlandsche Stoomboot Maatschappij (NSM, later NSBM). The engines would be built by John Cockerill in Liège. Also for NSM, Fop Smit launched the steam vessel Lodewijk on 15 March 1826. It would be used for service between Mainz and Strasbourg On 14 November 1826 the brothers laid down for their own account the Kinderdijk, a 380 tons Kofschip. She was launched on 24 May 1828. A Kofschip was a most often two-masted vessel meant for coastal shipping. Kinderdijk's hull was sheathed in zinc.

The shipbuilding partnership between Fop and Jan Smit did not last long. Jan left it, and rented his part of the shipyard to Fop. Fop Smit thus continued alone, but with both terrains. On 28 November 1828 Fop Smit laid down a two-deck commercial frigate of 34.2 m length. This might have been Vier Gebroeders, launched in 1830.

=== Fop Smit works on his own ===
Some early sailing ships built by Fop Smit
Name	Type	Laid Down	Launched	Tonnage	Principal	Notes
Vier Gebroeders	Frigate		23 Jun. 1830	643 ton	N/a	Captain F.C. Lupcke.
Cornelis Werner Eduard	Frigate		7 Sep. 1839	400 last	Weiland, Van Walcheren, W. Ruys J.D. Zn.	Captain D.H. Kramer.
Louise	Ship		25 Sep. 1840	500 last	J. Antheunis from Rotterdam.	Captain was J.F. Verschuur.
Jan Daniël	Barque		27 May 1841	450 last	W. Ruys J.D. Zn.	
Nieuw-Lekkerland	Barque		22 Jun. 1842	450 Java last	's Gravenhaagsche Scheepsrederij,	Captain W.H, Kramer.
Drie Gebroeders	Barque		30 Jul. 1844	300 last	W. Ruys J.D. Zn.	Captain T.C. Bauditz.

Early river and coastal steam vessels built by Fop Smit
Name	Type	Laid Down	Launched	Power	For	Notes
Prinses Marianne	Steam yacht		In service Feb. 1833		Rotterdam - Middelburg line	
Koningin der Nederlanden	Paddle steamer		Delivered 18 Apr. 1836		Rotterdam - Nijmegen line	
Herzog von Nassau	Paddle steamer		In service 7 Nov. 1837		First ship of DGNM	160 * 20', engines by Miller Ravenhill
Kronprinz(essin) von Preußen	Paddle steamer		In service Sep.1838		Rotterdam - Düsseldorf line of DGNM	
Stad 's Hertogenbosch	Paddle steamer		1 Sep. 1838		Rotterdam - 's-Hertogenbosch line	
Stad Gorinchem	Paddle steamer		In service Mar.? 1838	80 hp	Gorinchem - Middelburg line	Engines by Van Vlissingen en Dudok van Heel
Kinderdijk	Sea tug		31 Aug. 1843	140 hp	Smit's tug service	Engines by Van Vlissingen en Dudok van Heel.

What made Fop Smit special was the amount of steam vessels he built. Most of these were for inland shipping lines. For ocean-going sailing ships Fop Smit started a close cooperation with Willem Ruys J.D. zn. (1809–1889) in the late 1830s. Fop built a long line of sailing ships for Willem Ruys, who managed them for multiple owners that formed a partenreederei for each ship. Fop Smit himself also became a partner in many of these ships. These ships formed the nucleus of what would later become the Royal Rotterdam Lloyd.

=== Smit Slikkerveer and J. & K. Smit ===
The ship Louise, launched in 1840 was launched from Fop Smit's shipyard in Slikkerveer, municipality Ridderkerk. This also applied to Drie Gebroeders in 1844. In 1851, the Fop Smit was launched by J. Smit from his shipyard in Slikkerveer. From then on a list of ships was built in Slikkerveer by Jan Smit, a.k.a. as Jan Smit Fopszoon, or Jan Fz. Jan would also build several ships for his father, amongst these most of the Noach's, designed by his son Arie.

In 1847 the sons of Jan Smit started their own shipyard J. & K. Smit on the terrain of their father Jan Foppe, southeast of that of Fop Smit. In 1906 J. & K. Smit had to leave this terrain. It obviously moved to a terrain north of that of L. Smit, a situation recognizable on the black and white aerial photograph. In 1906 the new shipyard was getting readied.

=== L. Smit towage service ===
In 1842 Fop Smit founded a towage service between Hellevoetsluis and Brouwershaven. At the time Hellevoetsluis was the outport of Rotterdam. Hellevoetsluis was connected to Rotterdam via the ship canal Canal through Voorne. Brouwershaven on Schouwen-Duiveland offered the best opportunity to wait for a favorable wind to sail through the English Channel. Another reason to found the tug service was to decrease the losses through accidents. Therefore, many shipping lines and insurers in Rotterdam united to enable the foundation of the towage service. Fop Smit would manage it and build its first tugboat of 140 hp. The company would receive a yearly subsidy by multiple commercial parties. The first tug, Kinderdijk entered service in December 1843.

This tug service would become a major customer of the shipyard. In April 1847 Fop Smit bought the steam yacht Stad Gorinchem for 45,000 guilders, to serve as the second ship of the tow service. The tug service would be continued as L. Smit & Co., later Smit International.

=== The switch to iron (1846) ===
The first steam vessels were made of wood, but in time the first iron hulls appeared. In 1837 Fijenoord launched its first commercial iron steamship. In 1844 Van Vlissingen en Dudok van Heel secured orders for iron tugs on the Rhine, and started to construct its own shipyard. If iron was the future for inland navigation, Fop Smit had to follow suit, or loose this market. In June 1846 Fop Smit delivered the iron steam yacht Amicitia. For construction in iron, the shipyard had to acquire a lot of technical skills. On the other hand, it could employ these on the market for sailing ships. In 1847 Fop Smit launched the schooner Industrie, the first iron sailing vessel of the Netherlands. Van Vlissingen en Dudok van Heel followed by launching its own iron schooners.

In 1853 Fop Smit launched California, the first Dutch iron ship. (Ship in the sense of a fully rigged three mast sailing vessel.) Other innovations that Fop Smit promoted were iron masts and iron stays. On 31 March 1856 the machine factory Diepeveen, Lels en Smit was founded. With Smit referring to Fop's son Leendert, and Fop's brother's son Jan.

The main market for Dutch ocean going ships was the route to the Dutch East Indies. From about 1848 this profited from extremely favorable circumstances, such that even small old ships still made a profit. This lasted until freight rates suddenly plummeted in 1857. It led to a major crises in the Dutch shipping industry. Fop Smit survived the crisis, and even built some more iron sailing ships in the early 1860s. These had the advantage that they suffered less partial damage to the cargo. Another advantage of Smit's ships was their speed. E.g. in 1859 the clipper Noach made the trip from Batavia to Brouwershaven in a record time of 82 days.

Some ocean going vessels built by Fop Smit
Name	Type	Laid Down	Launched	Tonnage	Power	Principal	Notes
Japara	Barque		4 Nov. 1846	300 last		W. Ruys J.D. Zn.	
Ida Elisabeth	Barque		15 Jul. 1847	300 last		W. Ruys J.D. Zn.	
Industrie	Iron schooner		21 Sep. 1847	120 rye last		W. Ruys J.D. Zn.	First Dutch iron sailing vessel
Resident van Son	Barque	15 Jul. 1847	23 May 1849	450 last		W. Ruys J.D. Zn.	
Doelwijk	Barque	23 May 1849	18 Sep. 1850	400 last		W. Ruys J.D. Zn.	Captain D.H. Kramer
Fop Smit	Barque	18 Sep. 1850	2 Oct. 1851	350 last			
Macassar	Iron Screw steamship		3 Jun. 1851			Cores de Vries in D.E.I	
Ambon	three mast screw ship	3 Jun. 1851	26 Nov. 1851			Cores de Vries in D.E.I	
California	Iron clipper	1 Mar. 1852	24 Mar. 1853	400 last		Louis Bienfait en Zoon	First Dutch iron Ship
Australie	Barque ship	18 Dec. 1852	14 Mar. 1854	360 last		Q. Blauw in Amsterdam	
De Maas	Iron clipper		25 Aug. 1854	400 last		C. Balguerie & Zonen, Rotterdam	
Ternate	Iron clipper	25 Aug. 1854	16 Jul. 1855	400 last		H. van Rijckevorsel	175 feet long
Noach	Clipper		19 Sep. 1857	500 last		Own account	First Dutch ship with all metal stays
Oceaan	Iron clipper	24 Dec. 1856	17 Oct. 1857	500 last		Louis Bienfait en Zoon	
Jan de Wit	Iron clipper		15 Jun. 1858	425 last		C. Balguerie en Zoon	
Sara	Iron screw steam ship	18 Nov. 1861	5 May 1862	600 ton		Dordrecht - London line	
Cornelia	Iron barque		29 May 1863	400 last		L. Bienfait en Zoon	
Hoek van Holland	Iron clipper		2 Apr. 1864	500 last		Wm Ruys	
Willem en Clara	Iron screw steam vessel	2 Apr. 1864	17 Sep. 1864			Dordrecht - London line	Laid down as Stad Dordrecht

Some river and coastal steam vessels built by Fop Smit
Name	Type	Laid Down	Launched	Power	For	Notes
Amicitia	Iron steam yacht		Delivered June 1846		Rotterdam - Antwerp line	Engines by Van Vlissingen en Dudok van Heel
Jan van Arkel No.2	Paddle steamer		8 Mar. 1847		's-Hertogenbosch Gorinchem Schiedam line.	
Amicitia No. 2	Iron steam yacht	16 Aug. 1847			Rotterdam - Antwerp line	
Zederik	Iron Screw steam vessel	19 Mar. 1852	12 Jul. 1852		Gorinchem - Vianen line	
Stad Middelburg	Iron Steam yacht	26 Mar. 1852	28 Dec. 1852		Middelburg - Rotterdam line	
Stad Rotterdam	Steam yacht	25 Jun. 1852	1 April 1853		Rotterdam - 's-Hertogenbosch line	Engines by Van Vlissingen en Dudok van Heel
Volharding	Screw steam vessel		8 Jun. 1853		Leiden - Amsterdam line	
Oude Maas	Steam yacht		8 Dec. 1853	60 hp	Rotterdam - Dordrecht - Oud-Beijerland line	120 * 16.5 feet
Stad Vlissingen	Iron steam yacht		30 Jan. 1854		Vlissingen - Rotterdam line	
De IJssel	Iron steam vessel		14 Dec. 1854		Rotterdam - Gouda line	
Brouwershaven.	Iron tug		19 Dec. 1854		Smit's tug service	
Telegraaf II	Iron Steam yacht		8 Mar. 1856		Rotterdam - Antwerpen line	
Telegraaf III	Iron steam yacht		17 Dec. 1857		Rotterdam - Antwerpen line	
Stad Gorinchem	Iron screw steam vessel	23 Nov. 1859	25 Apr. 1860		Gorinchem - Amsterdam line	Engines by Diepeveen, Lels en Smit
Reserve	Iron tug		8 Jun. 1860			
Hellevoetsluis	Iron tug	3 Mar. 1862				
Stad Amsterdam	Screw steam vessel	10 June 1863	2 Feb. 1864		Gorinchem - Gouda - Amsterdam line	
Karel Hertog van Gelder	Screw steam vessel	19 Feb. 1864	21 Jul. 1864		Arnhem - Rotterdam - Schiedam line	
Merwede	Steam yacht	17 Sep. 1864	23 Feb. 1865	90 hp	Gorinchem - Rotterdam line	Line owned by Fop Smit
De Linge	Screw steam vessel		29 Jul. 1865		Gorinchem - Geldermalsen line	
Leerdam	Screw steam vessel	29 Jul. 1865	28 Sep. 1865		Gorinchem - Leerdam line	Engines by Diepeveen, Lels en Smit
Merwede II	Screw steam vessel		1 Feb. 1866		Rotterdam - Gorinchem line	Engines by Diepeveen, Lels en Smit

== History as L. Smit and Son shipyard ==
=== Succession of Fop Smit ===
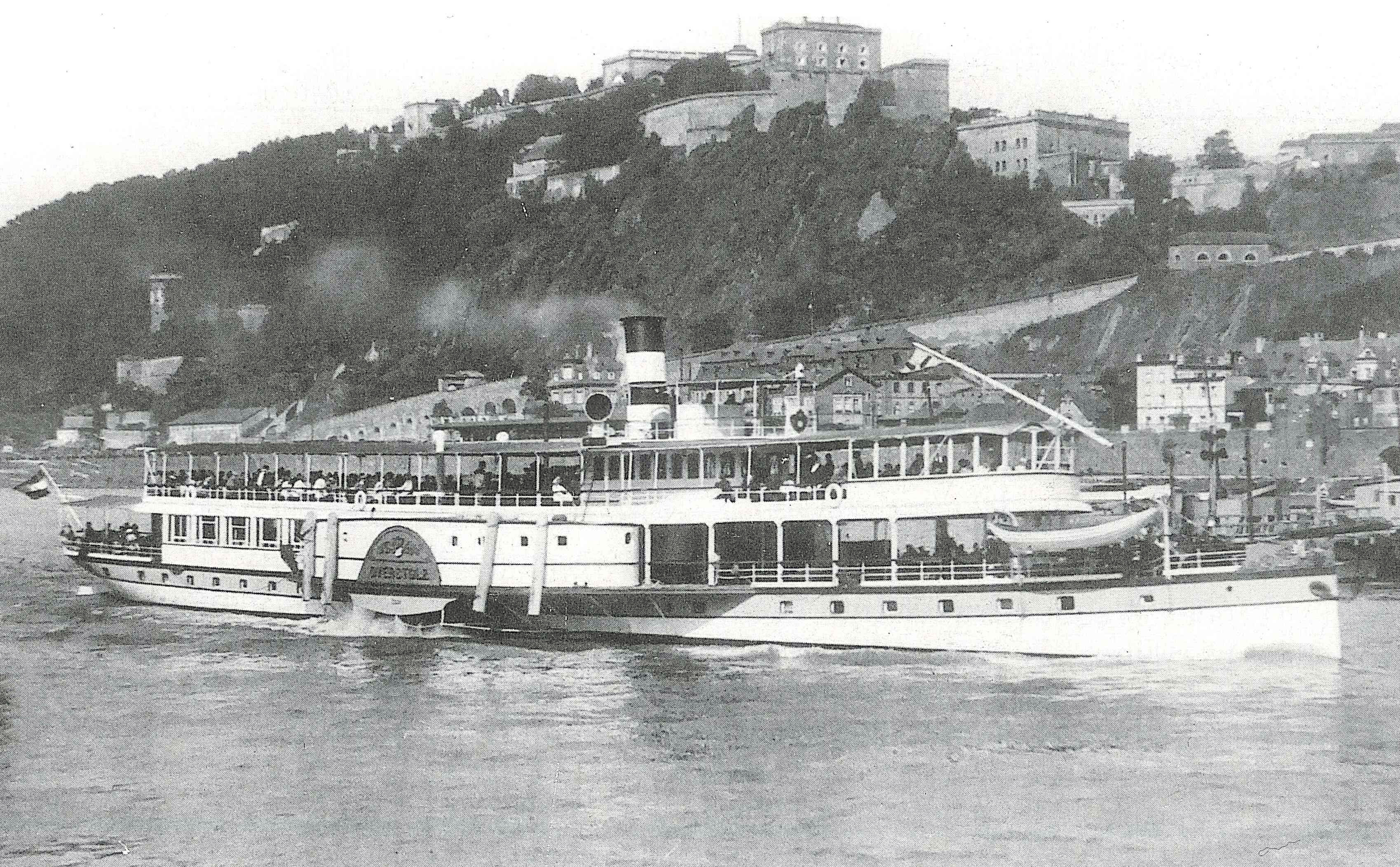
Overstolz, launched in 1890

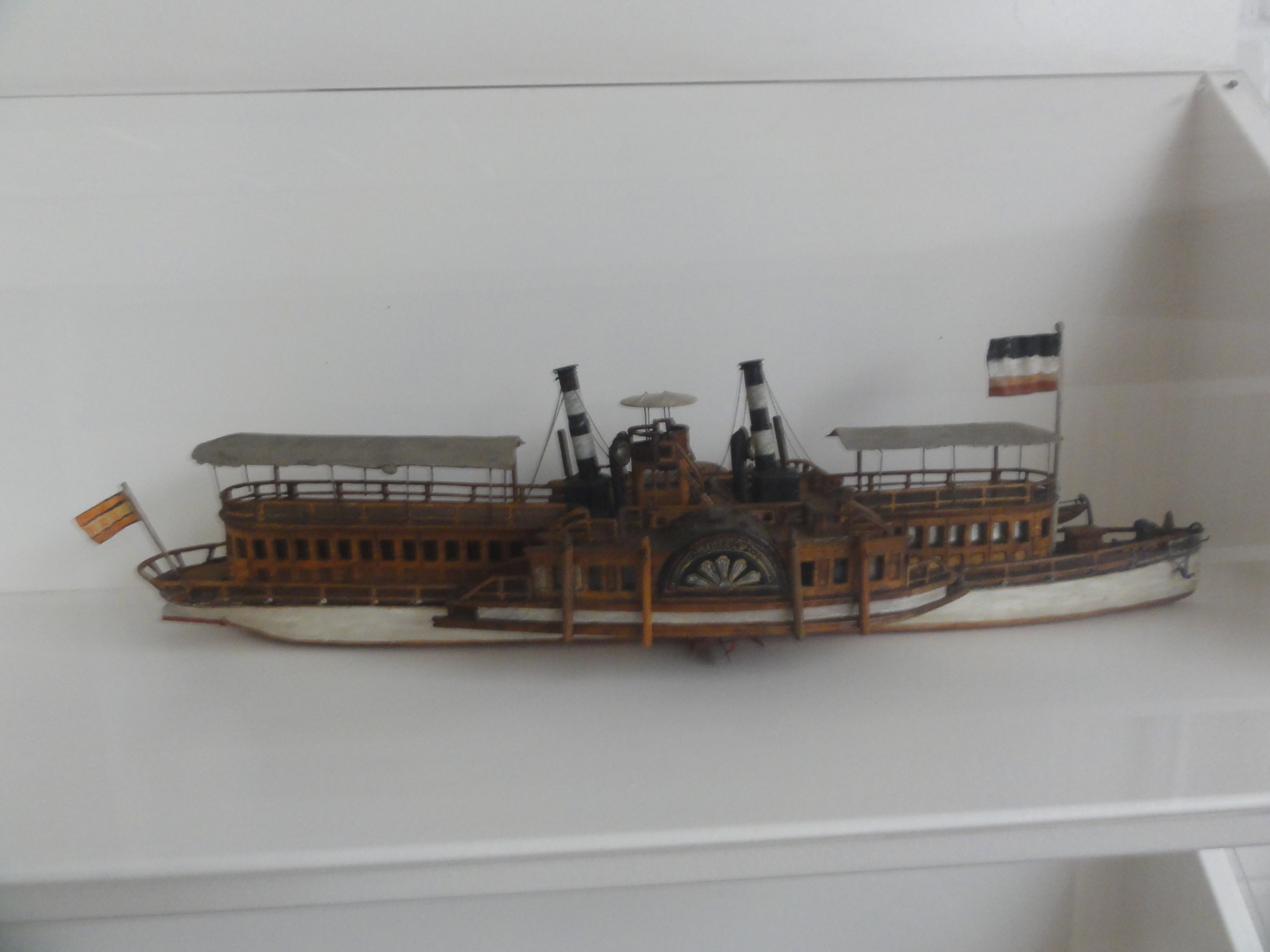
Friede (1866) of 73 m

After his death on 25 August 1866, Fop Smit was succeeded by his four sons. Leendert Smit would succeed to his shipyard, and his office as ambachtsheer of Nieuw Lekkerland. However, there can be little doubt that Fop Smit's estate consisted primarily of stock and participations in a lot of businesses. A substantial part was formed by the partial and or full ownership of many ships. These had probably not earned much, or even lost money since the 1857 shipping crisis. In summary, the financial power behind L. Smit en Zoon was a lot less than that behind Fop Smit shipyard. On 15 November Leendert made a partnership with his nephew Jan Smit V. This probably brought a lot of capital back into the business.

In the night of 25 to 26 February 1869 most of the shipyard of L. Smit en Zoon would burn down. The insurance would handle the damage to the satisfaction of the company.

=== L. Smit & Co. vs. L. Smit & Zoon ===
Fop Smit's tug service was continued by a consortium called L. Smit & Co. from Alblasserdam, which got its permit by decree of 4 January 1869. In 1903 it became the N.V. L. Smit en Co.'s Sleepdienst. Thus L. Smit & Co, refers to the tug service. L. Smit en Zoon refers to the shipbuilding company.

=== Steam vessels for inland navigation ===
After the death of Fop Smit, the business of building ships for inland navigation kind of continued as usual. For deep rivers, the propeller became ever more popular, but for shallow waters, the paddle steamer remained in use. L. Smit was a leader in the construction of vessels for inland (passenger) shipping lines. This is shown by the number of vessels that L. Smit exported to Germany, and in particular by the fact that this export continued after German industrial capability had surpassed the Dutch in so many ways. A telltale sign is that some German shipping lines ordered vessels at L. Smit with Swiss engines.

Some river and coastal steam vessels built by L. Smit & Zoon
Name	Type	Laid Down	Launched	Power	For	Notes
Paddle steamer No. 1	Paddle steamer	24 Apr. 1866	21 Nov. 1866		Later Köln-Düsseldorfer shipping line	240 feet and 140 hp
Paddle steamer No. 2	Paddle steamer	24 Apr. 1866	24 Nov. 1866		Later Köln-Düsseldorfer shipping line	240 * 25 * 3 feet and 140 hp
Zeeland	Iron tug	3 Aug. 1867			L. Smit & Co.	
Industrie	Steam yacht		2 May 1868			
Industrie	Screw steam vessel		18 Jun. 1869		Rudolf Wahl in Mannheim	Machines by Diepeveen, Lels & Smit.
Middelharnis?	Paddle steamer	22 Jul. 1869	24 Dec. 1869.		Rotterdam - Middelharnis line.	Machines by Diepeveen, Lels & Smit.
Deutscher Kaiser	Iron paddle steamer		30 May 1870	140 hp	Later Köln-Düsseldorfer line.	260 feet, Engines by Ravenhill, Hodgson & Co.
An	Iron tug	21 Sep. 1872		50 hp	Own account	
A	Steam Hopper barge		10 Sep. 1877	25 hp	A. Volker Lz. Sliedrecht	
Maasmond II	Steam hopper barge		30 Mar. 1878		A. Volker Lz. & P.A. Bos	capacity 160 m^{3}
Leerdam	Screw steam vessel		22 Jan. 1879		Rotterdam - Leerdam line	Machines by DLS
Argus	Screw steam vessel		17 Mar. 1879		Rotterdam investigation service	DLS compound engines with surface condensers
A	Paddle steamer		11 Jun. 1879		Rotterdam - Gorinchem line	Fop Smit & Co.
Vlaardingen III	Screw steam vessel		c. Jul. 1880	25 hp	Vlaardingen steam vessel company	DLS compound engines
Kolonel	Screw steam vessel		27 Sep. 1880		Volker and Bos	
Willem I	Paddle steamer		13 Apr. 1881		Rederij Maas en Rijn	Engines DLS
A	Paddle steamer	13 Apr. 1881	28 Dec. 1881		Preussisch-Rheinische	Engines Escher Wyss & Cie.
Industrie III	Screw steam vessel		27 May 1881		Rudolf Wahl Mannheim	
Zealandia	Sea screw tug	27 May 1881	8 Nov. 1881		For William Watkins London	
Havik	Screw tug		17 Aug. 1881		Tug service L. Smit & Co.	
Colonia I	Screw tug	17 Aug. 1881	24 Dec. 1881		Kölnische Dampf schleppschifffahrt	
Valk II	Screw Steam vessel		4 Sep. 1882	25 hp comp.	Zeeuwsche Stoomboot Maatschappij	
Queen	Paddle steamer	4 Sep. 1882	5 Jan. 1883		Watkins, Weymouth Steamboat Company	
Amsterdam	Pump hopper barge	4 Sep. 1882	19 Dec. 1882	45 hp comp.	L. Kalis & Co.	Machines DLS 275 m^{3} capacity
Wodan	Paddle steamer tug		25 Jul. 1883		L. Smit & Co. tug service	
Colonia III	Screw tug		10 Aug. 1883	70 hp comp.	Kölnische Dampf schleppschifffahrt	Engines Escher Wyss & Cie.
Industrie	Screw steamer	10 Aug. 1883	31 Oct. 1883	60 hp	Badische Schrauben-Dampfs. G. (BSDG)	Engines by Howaldt brothers
Hohenstaufen	Steel paddle steamer	10 Aug. 1883	26 Mar. 1884		Preussisch-Rheinische	
Oran	Suction hopper barge		18 Dec. 1884		J. Dollfus, Oran	
Industrie	Steel twin screw ship	18 Dec. 1884	22 Jan. 1885		London - Cologne line (BSDG)	200 * 28.5 * 12.5 feet 750 ton
Industrie VI	Screw Vessel		19 Feb. 1885		Oberrheinische Schifffahrts-Gesellschaft Mannheim	Engines by DLS
Industrie VII	Screw Vessel		30 Mar. 1885		Oberrheinische Schifffahrts-Gesellschaft Mannheim	
Oude Maas I	Iron paddle steamer	30 Mar. 1885	22 Jul. 1885	comp.	Rotterdam - Oud-Beijerland line	Oude Maas Steamboat Company
Hansa	Steel paddle steamer		23 Oct. 1885	550 ihp	Rheinische Dampfschiffahrt G. Cologne	Engines Escher Wyss & Cie.
Rhein	Paddle Steamer		29 Nov. 1887		Preussisch-Rheinische D.G.	
Koningin Emma	Steel paddle steamer		14 Jun. 1889		Rotterdam - Mannheim line	Nederlandsche Stoombootrederij
Overstolz	Paddle steamer		2 Apr. 1890		Preussisch-Rheinische D.G.	Engines Escher Wyss & Cie.
Wilhelmina	Steel paddle steamer		20 May 1891		Rotterdam - Mannheim line	Ned. Stoombootrederij
Willem III	Steel paddle steamer		20 Aug. 1891	550 ihp	Rotterdam - Mannheim line	Ned. Stoombootreederij
Oerona	Paddle steamer		17 Feb. 1893			DLS, Bonn Beueler Faehr A.G.
A	Steel paddle steamer	18 Mar. 1893	10 Aug. 1893		Preusische-Rheinische D.G.	Engines Escher Wyss & Cie.
Hollandia	Steel paddle steamer	10 Aug. 1893	23 Nov. 1893	625 ihp	Rotterdam - Mannheim line	DLS Ned. Stoomboot Rederij
Concurrent I	Steel tug		22 Jan. 1895	500 ihp	Tug service Smit & Co.	40 * 7.50 * 2.75 m
W.F. Leemans	Paddle steamer	4 Jun. 1896	6 Oct. 1896	450 ihp	Rotterdam - Gorinchem line	Fop Smit & Co.
Steyn	Paddle steamer		2 Oct. 1902	400 hp	Rotterdam - Gorinchem line	Fop Smit & Co.
Kruger	Paddle steamer		2 Oct. 1902	400 hp	Rotterdam - Gorinchem line	Fop Smit & Co.
Leviathan	Suction hopper barge		10 Oct. 1904		Galveston, Texas	American customer
Köln	Suction dredger		4 Jan. 1905			Köln. Tiefbau Ges.
H.A.M. 2	Suction hopper barge		30 Jan. 1912		Surabaya harbor works	Hollandsche Aannemings Maatschappij
Suriname	Suction hopper barge				Kalis, Sliedrecht	94 * 8.60 * 4.55 m

=== Ocean going vessels ===
The opening of the Suez Canal in November 1869 radically changed shipping to the Dutch East Indies. In 1872 Stoomvaart Maatschappij Nederland established a reliable and fast shipping line between the Netherlands and the Dutch East Indies. In about 1880 steamships still required a 25-50 guilders a last higher freight rate than sailing ships. It meant that for higher value products, it became more economical to rely on steamships. For commodities like sugar and coffee, sail continued to be important. It all led to an increase in the average size of sailing ships, from 454 ton in 1860 to about 1000 ton in 1880.

The sailing ship with auxiliary power Nestor of 2,000 ton, was the last ship laid down by Fop Smit, and one of the first ships completed by L. Smit en zoon. The sailing ship with auxiliary power was supposed to sail most of the time, and to steam when the weather was unfavorable. The idea was probably sound, but the sailing ship with auxiliary power would lose to the ocean liner, which was supposed to use steam except for emergencies. The problem for L. Smit, and the rest of the Dutch shipbuilding industry, was that it was not capable of building machinery that was on par with that of British shipbuilders. When it finally could, it lacked the experience to prove its ability.

The tables reflect this story. While L. Smit built dozens of river vessels in the 1870 and 1880s, only a handful of ocean-going vessels was built. The launch of Maetsuijcker in 1890 came about thanks to the foundationo of the Koninklijke Paketvaart-Maatschappij, which ordered four of her first ships at shipbuilding company De Schelde. De Schelde then subcontracted with L. Smit to build Maetsuijcker, for which she would herself build the engines.

Some ocean going vessels built by L. Smit & Zoon
Name	Type	Laid down	Launched	Tonnage	Power	Principal	Notes
Nestor	Iron clipper		1 Sep. 1866	2000 ton	50 hp		With aux. steam power
Industrie	Iron clipper	8 July 1868	24 April 1872.	900 last		Own account	
Adonis	Iron screw steamer		February 1873			Dunlop, Mees & Co.	For traffic in East Africa
Batavier	Iron clipper		22 April 1876	1,890 rt		Own account	
Iberia	Steel screw steamship		4 June 1884			W.H. Muller & Co.	
Maetsuijcker	Screw ship		5 Jul. 1890			KPM in DEI	Engines by De Schelde
Tromp	Steel frigate	5 Jul. 1890	14 Feb. 1891			Zur Muhlen	2,600 ton
Noordzee	Sea tug	Apr. 1891	17 Dec. 1891		600 ihp	Tug service L. Smit & Co	Engines De Schelde
Oostzee	Sea tug	Apr. 1891			600 ihp	Tug service L. Smit & Co	Engines De Schelde
Tubalkaïn	Steel frigate	18 March 1893	N/a		2800 ton		Own account
Oceaan	Steel ocean tug		1 Dec. 1894		1,200 ihp	Tug service L. Smit & Co	Engines De Schelde
Tilburg	Steamship		10 Dec. 1917	1,378 Grt	950 ihp	Transatlanta	

=== Further innovation ===
The shipyard continued to innovate. Construction of iron ships required specialized staff. By 1882 engineer L.D. van Ouwerkerk from Delft University worked at L. Smit, and was also part of the executive board. The requirements for skills also applied to the blue collar workers. In 1869 the shipyards of the Smit clan asked the municipality of Nieuw-Lekkerland to improve extended primary education by adding French, English, mathematics and construction drawing. They provided 1,075 guilders a year for an extra teacher to make this possible.

The cooperation between the companies, which had earlier led to the establishment of machine factory Diepeveen, Lels & Smit, also led to the establishment of one of the first power stations of the Netherlands. By 1881 the shipyard had electric lighting, which enabled it to work more hours in winter. The construction of Industrie, launched in January 1885 was another highlight. She was a steel twin screw ship which established a direct connection between London and Cologne. Meanwhile, shipbuilding in the Kinderdijk area was in a crisis by 1886.

In July 1893 orders were given for the foundations of a new patent slip at Kinderdijk. In 1899 the foundations for a boiler factory and machine factory were tendered. In 1904 a new office was built. In 1906 orders were given for a boiler shed, smithy and electricity station.

=== Ocean going tugs ===
Soon after its foundation, the shipbuilding company De Schelde started to cooperate with L. Smit. Arie Smit, younger brother of Jan Smit V, was the main founder of De Schelde. De Schelde would bring expertise about engines for the high seas into the Smit "cluster". It became the preferred supplier of L. Smit for the larger types of engines. In April 1891 it got orders for two triple expansion compound steam engines with surface condensers for two ocean going screw tugs that L. Smit was building for tug service L. Smit & Co.

These two ocean going tugs were Noordzee and Oostzee. They were very much fit for service on the Nieuwe Waterweg, which had been completed in 1872. What made them special was their ability to serve on the ocean. For this they had a raised forecastle, a bridge, a covered stern, and bunkers large enough to store enough coal to steam for 12 days at full power. Their size of 39 * 7 * 4.25 (hold) m was another feature which enabled them to operate on the oceans.

Oceaan (1894) came next. With a size of 45 * 8.60 * 4.60 m, and twice the power of the previous tugs, it clearly expressed the ambition of tug service L. Smit & Co. Indeed, the market for long distance towing would develop. It led to many orders for ocean going tugs at L. Smit and related shipbuilding companies. By March 1897 there were plans for two more Noordzee class tugs, and two more Oceaan class tugs.

=== Dredging equipment ===
The specialization in dredging equipment like hopper barges can be traced back to at least 1877, and would prove to be a long-term success. For a time J. & K. Smit would build much more dredging equipment than L. Smit and Son did. After the 1900 Galveston hurricane the Americans ordered the steam suction hopper barge Leviathan at L. Smit. It showed that in niche areas, the Dutch shipbuilders could compete with the generally more advanced American shipbuilders.

=== Royal visit ===
On 5 March 1906 L. Smit and Son shipbuilding company was visited by Queen Wilhelmina of the Netherlands and Prince Hendrik. They were received by L.J. Smit (son of L. Smit), the company's engineer W. de Gelder, and L.F.J. van Vliet, mayor of Nieuw-Lekkerland. They also met Mrs. L.J. Smit and Jan Smit V. At the time, a bucket dredger for England was getting finished, as was the saloon paddle steamer Schiller. The suction hopper barge Seahound for a Sliedrecht company was launched by the queen. The tug Gouwzee of L. Smit & Co. was at the yard. The paddle steamer Emma was on the parallel slipway, where she was getting lengthened. The couple then visited the boiler factory, and the machine factory where saw many modern machines, most of them American. In 1913 orders were given to add a new factory of 2,300 m^{3}.

=== World War I ===
World War I shut down the international market for river- coastal and dredging vessels, and forced the Dutch shipbuilding industry to construct sea-going ships. It seems that in 1915, L. Smit still launched only dredging equipment. However, that same year it already had three freighters at the slipways. The facilities at L. Smit made that these were small ships. Alblasserdam and Dagny I (ex-Kinderdijk), launched in 1916 were only 1,382 GRT. In 1917 L. Smit launched Kralingen and Tilburg of 1,378 Grt / 2,200 ton dwt. In 1918 she had two more of these ships (No. 795 and 796) on the slipway. These remained on the slipway in 1918.

== N.V. L. Smit & Zoon's Scheeps- en Werktuigbouw (1920–1965) ==
Some vessels built by L. Smit & Zoon's Scheeps- en Werktuigbouw 1920–1940
Name	Type	Laid Down	Launched	Size	Power	Principal	Notes
Zwarte Zee	Ocean going tug		2 Jun. 1933	63.40 * 10.13 * 5.90 m	4,000 ihp	L. Smit & Co.	Diesel eng.
Adolphe Delands	Suction hopper barge		12 Jun. 1937	49 * 8.60 * 4.55 m	350 hp	Port of Safi	
Le Puissant	Sea going tug		1 Mar. 1938	33 * 7.80 * 4 m	800 hp	Dunkirk	Werkspoor eng.
Rode Zee	Ocean going tug		25 Apr. 1938	45 * 8.10 * 4.85 m	1,300 hp	L. Smit & Co.	Smit-M.A.N. eng.

=== Incorporated ===
L. Smit en Zoon was incorporated in March 1920 as N.V. L. Smit & Zoon's Scheeps- en Werktuigbouw.

=== Interwar period ===
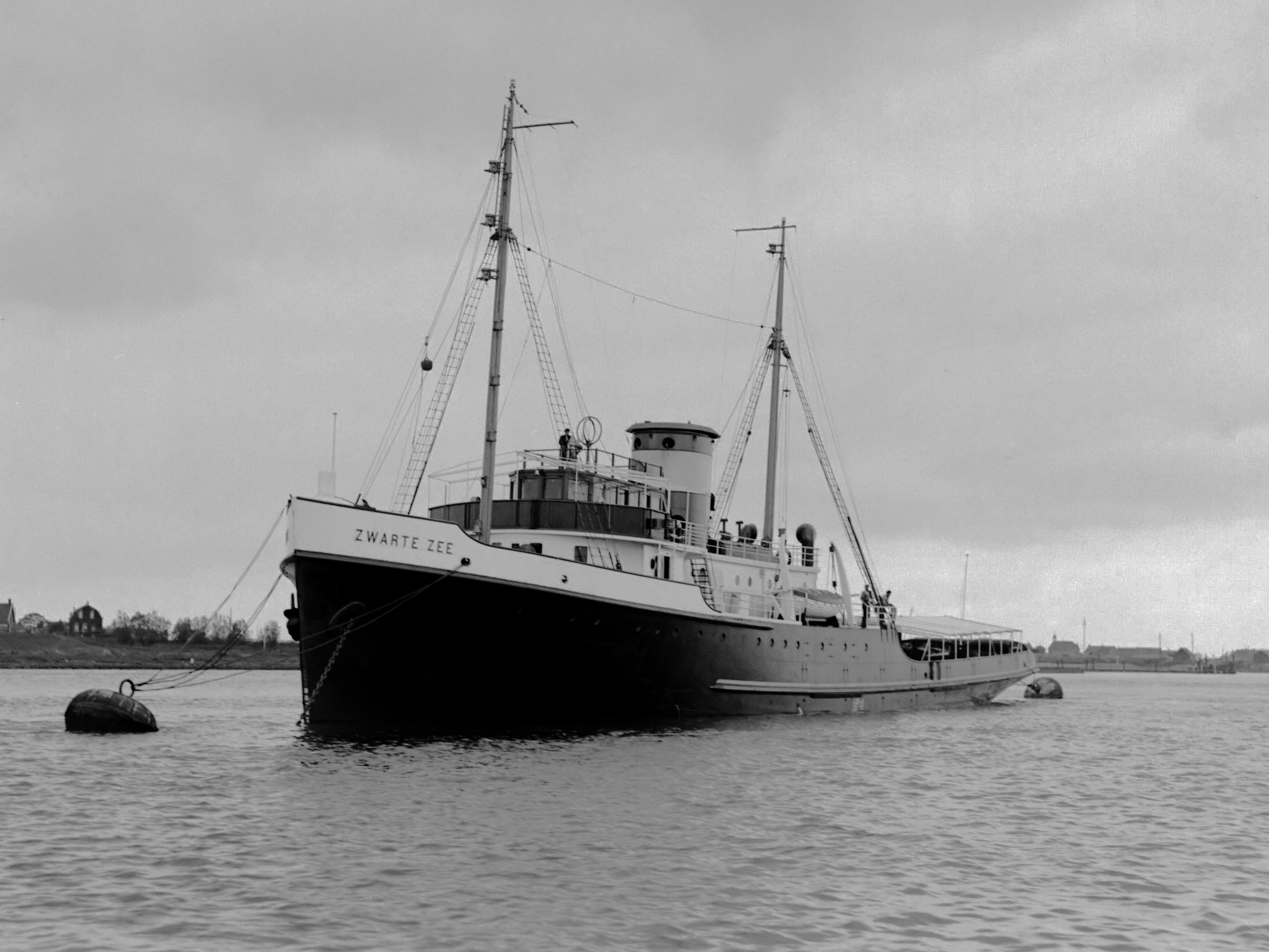
Zwarte Zee (1933)

After the war there was a boom in shipbuilding. Already in 1922, more than enough ships had been built, and shipping lines started to lose money. Shipbuilders then cut hours and wages, which L. Smit also did. In 1922 L. Smit launched a suction hopper barge and a bucket dredger for its own account. It ended the year with a freighter, a suction hopper barge, a suction dredger and a bucket dredger at the slipways, all for its own account. This was a rather unusual order portfolio in comparison to other shipyards. E.g. J. & K. Smit had regular orders for 5 ships. The January 1923 Occupation of the Ruhr was very damaging to the Dutch shipbuilding industry, especially in South Holland. Raw material prices soared, and demand for ships collapsed.

In 1925 the situation was somewhat better with the construction of the suction hopper barges Meuse and H.A.M. 301, two Dortmund Ems Canal ships and some barges for the Thames. In 1926 4 vessels were launched. In 1927 two tugs and some barges were built. For L. Smit & Co. the sea going tug Noordzee was built. In 1928 L. Smit launched two bucket dredgers and some barges. In 1929 L. Smit launched three suction hopper barges, a bucket dredger, and a few smaller vessels.

For the Dutch shipbuilding industry, the third quarter of 1929 would be the busiest since the fourth quarter of 1922.

By mid 1930, the Great Depression took its toll. In 1930 L. Smit still launched three tugs and two dredging barges. It next took the risk to build a bucket dredger and a suction hopper barge without having a customer for them. In 1932 only two dredging barges for Belgium, and the bucket dredger G.G.A, were launched. By the end of that year it had the tug Zwarte Zee, and two dredging vessels under construction. Zwarte Zee was the only ship launched by L. Smit in 1933. By the end of that year it had the small tanker Leonidas 3 under construction. In 1934 it launched the small motor tanker Leonidas III and two dredging vessels. By the end of that year it had two small motor tankers and one cutter suction dredger on order. By the end of 1935 only about a hundred people were still employed by L. Smit.

In 1936 the shipbuilding market started to recover. L. Smit now built a number of heavy tugboats, some more coastal motor tankers, and also more dredging equipment.

=== World War II ===
The shipbuilding company continued to operate during World War II. In 1941 the tug Javazee was launched, but she capsized immediately after.

== IHC Holland ==
=== Cooperation in IHC Holland ===
The Industriële Handels Combinatie IHC in the Hague was a partnership founded during the war. The idea was focused on the dredging market, where the partners deemed themselves too small to take on the expected post-war orders on their own. The partnership consisted of Conrad Shipyard in Haarlem, Gusto Shipyard in Schiedam, Machine Factory De Klop in Sliedrecht, J. & K. Smit in Kinderdijk, L. Smit in Kinderdijk, and Verschure & Co's in Amsterdam. These were all strong players in dredging, but wanted to be more efficient and limit risk. In sales e.g. it was very inefficient for all these relatively small companies to have their own agents abroad.

In December 1946 IHC contracted with Turkey for 6 twin screw passenger ships. In September 1947 IHC got a French order for five big dredgers. The orders were then divided over the partners. In 1951 L. Smit launched a hopper barge for the harbor of Calcutta. On 18 June 1953 L. Smit launched Edgar Bonnet, the strongest tug of the world, for the Suez Canal Company. In 1958 L. Smit received orders for two more tugs of the same size as Edgar Bonnet, but with Diesel-electric propulsion.

Meanwhile, the partners continued to contract as separate legal entities on the national market. On 23 September 1947 L. Smit en Zoon's launched the ocean going tug Humber for L. Smit & Co. On 16 July 1955 HAM 302 was launched for Hollandse Aannemings Maatschappij. This was a trailing suction dredger hopper of 72 m length. HAM 304 (later W.D. Mersey), launched in March 1960, measured 94.50 * 16 * 7.30 m, could carry 4.000 ton and had 3,625 hp.

== Merger into IHC Holland ==
In 1965 the boards of 5 of the 6 companies which cooperated in IHC Holland decided to merge their companies. Conrad Shipyard en Stork Hijsch N.V. could not join, because it was part of the Stork conglomerate. In 1966 IHC Holland started to merge L. Smit and J. &. K. Smit shipyards into a partnership known as Smit Kinderdijk v.o.f. In 1978 IHC Holland was split in three parts, with the holding getting renamed to Caland Holdings in 1979. The offshore part became known as IHC Inter. In 1984 these merged again into IHC Caland.

The modern shipyard still contains some old buildings. See the large buildings on the interwar aerial photograph marked with 'J. & K. Smit' and 'L. Smit & Zn'. These are now (2021) completely hemmed in by more modern buildings. The slipways and most of the harbors are now covered with halls in order to work more comfortable and effectively.
