= MS Loreley (1996) =

Maltese ship

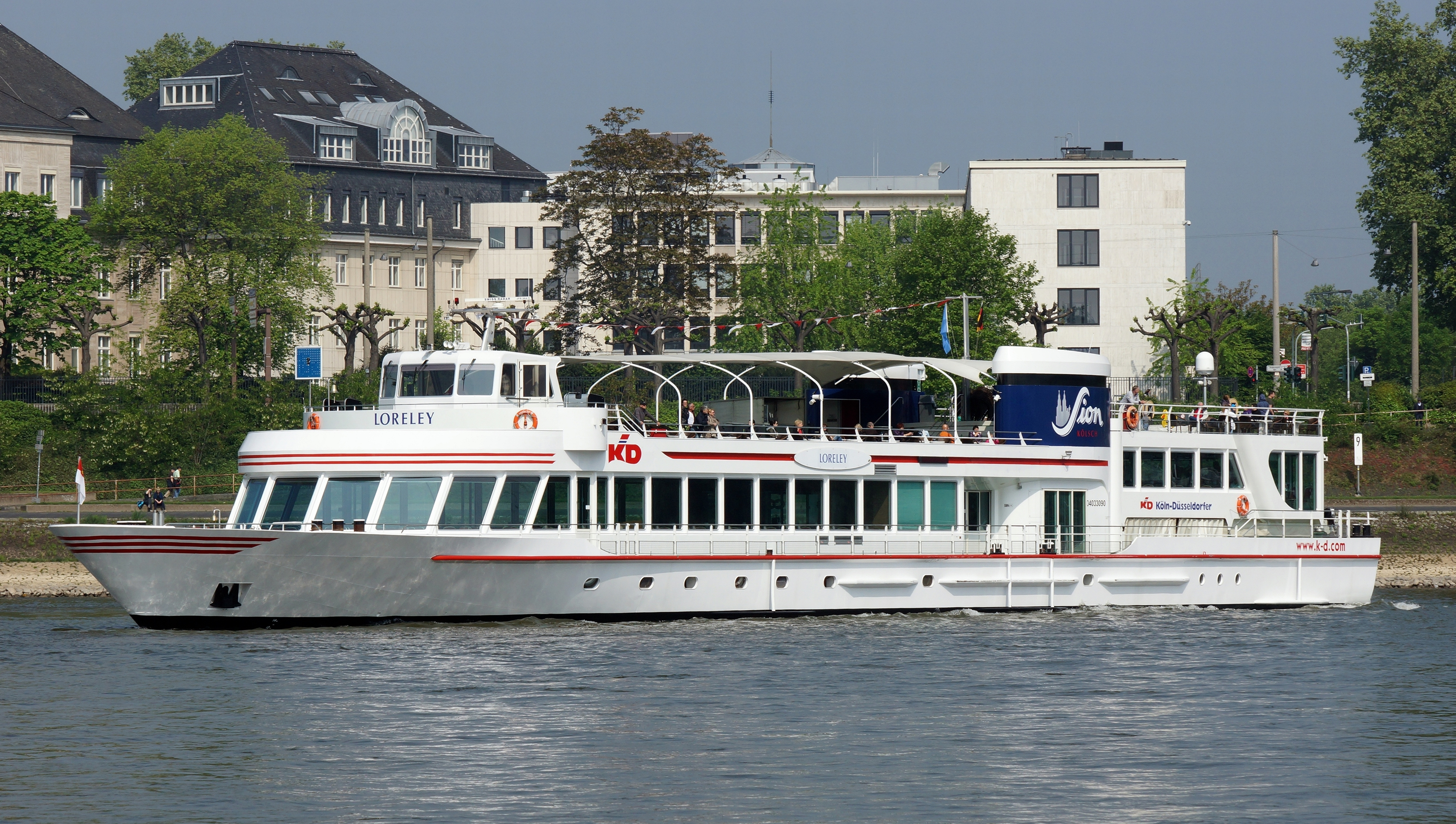
- RheinVision in Cologne

History
- Name: MS RheinVision
- Owner: Köln-Düsseldorfer
- Builder: Shipyard De Hoop
- Cost: 8 Mio. DM
- Yard number: 366
- Laid down: November 1995
- Launched: 1 June 1996
- In service: 6 July 1996

General characteristics
- Displacement: 604t
- Length: 68.00 m
- Beam: 11.40 m
- Height: 10.30 m
- Draught: 1.25 m
- Installed power: kW/692
- Propulsion: 2 × MAN D2840LE, 346 kW each

MS RheinVision (until 2023: MS Loreley) is a tourist boat built in 1996 for the Köln-Düsseldorfer Deutsche Rheinschiffahrt GmbH. From 2014 she is primarily used for charters and special occasions, as well as for cruises near Cologne. She is also used occasionally in schedule between Cologne and Linz am Rhein. RheinVision is the identical twin of Asbach, (ex-Marksburg).

== Boat characteristics ==
=== Boat description ===
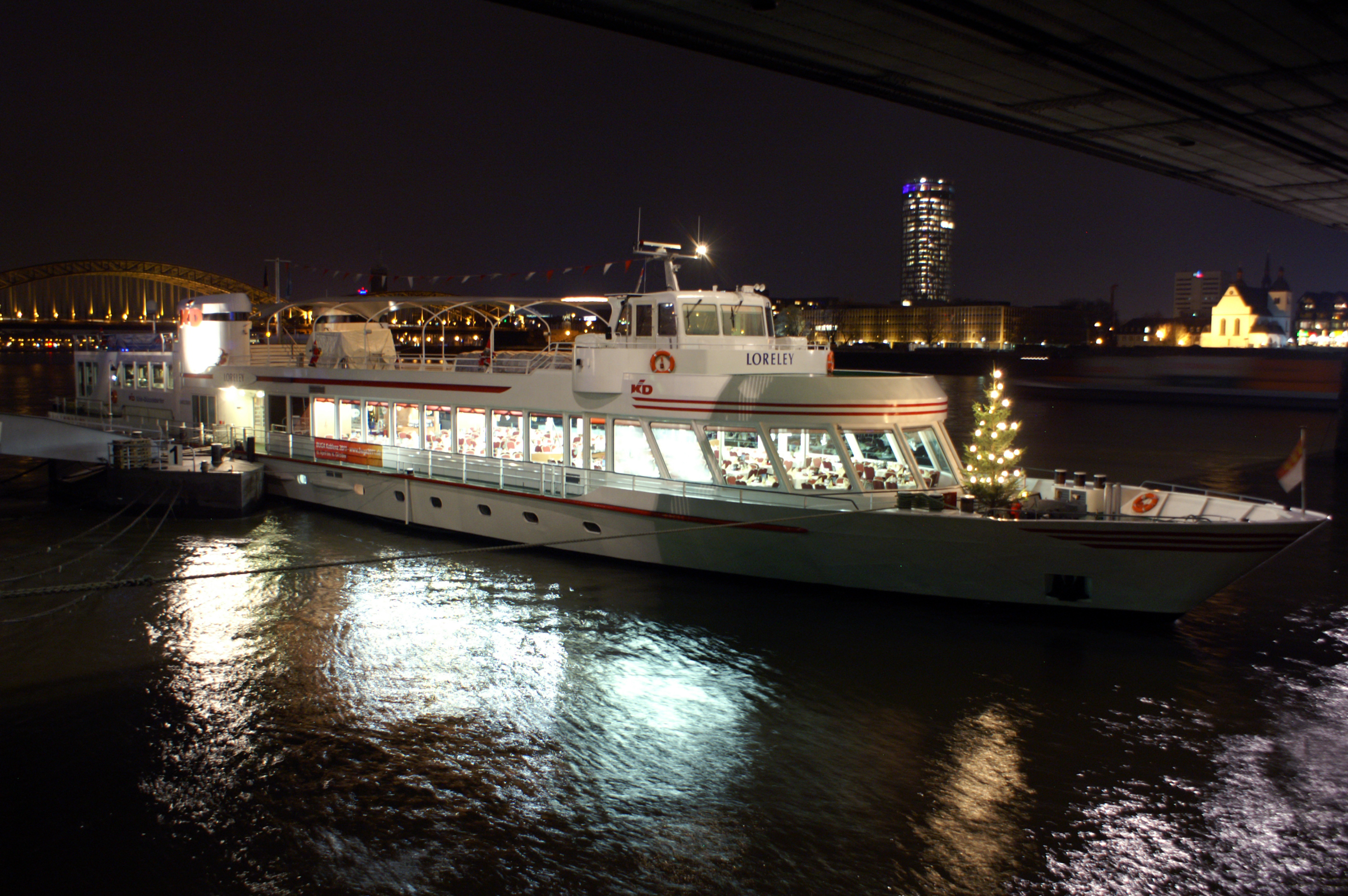
RheinVision by night

RheinVision is a three deck passenger ship with two large cabins on the main deck. In the regular configuration the front cabin accommodates 278 guests, and the somewhat higher rear cabin with bar accommodates 141 guests. Below the rear main cabin is a deck of only 1.40 m high, which is used to store bicycles. The main upper deck can accommodate 150 guests, and can be covered if the sun is too bright. The stern upper deck is a playground for children.

On the lower deck near the bow, there are 6 crew cabins on each side. Behind that, the boat's kitchen is situated, and behind that, the boat's wardrobe, toilets and office. A stair connects these parts of the boat to the main deck. Further to the stern are cool stores, general storage rooms, and the engine room. These parts are connected to the main deck by stairs only accessible to the boat's staff. Between the lower deck and the keel are tanks for drinking water, fuel and waste.

All stern decks are accessible for handicapped persons through a special facility. The useful surface of the boat is about 630 m^{2}. The height of the decks is 2.20 to 3 m. Maximum passenger capacity is 600 people.

=== Technical characteristics ===
RheinVision has two V-10-Zylinder-Diesel engines of 346 kW of Baureihe MAN D2840LE. These turn two Aquamaster propellers of the Rauma US381/1500 type. The bow propeller by shipyard De Gerlien van Time has its own 230 kW strong MAN engine. The boat is 68.13 m long, 11.40 m wide and 10.30 m high. When fully loaded, draft is still only 1.25 m.

== Service ==
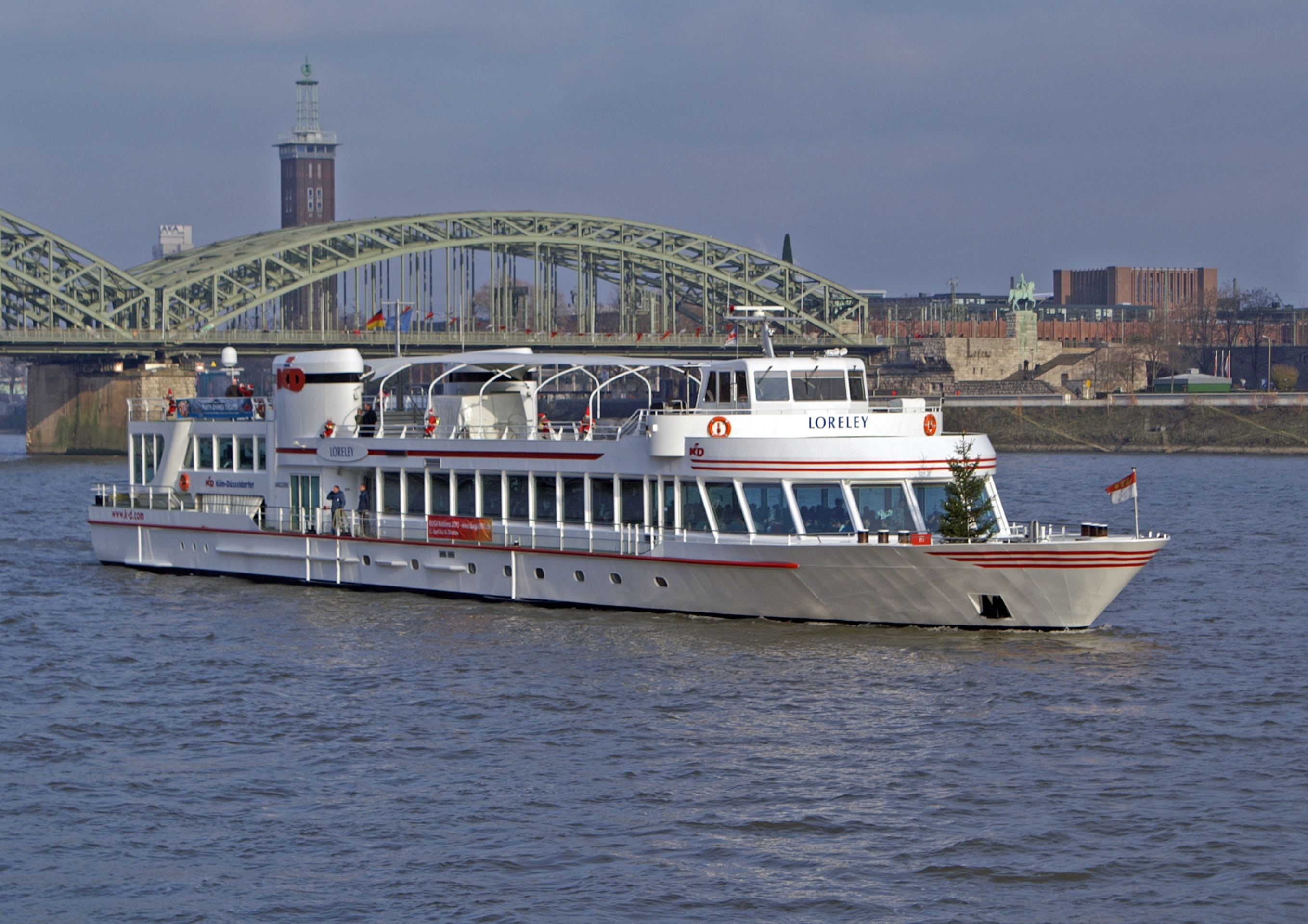
RheinVision sailing

RheinVision was built in 1995–1996 by the Dutch Shipyard De Hoop in Rijnwaarden. She was laid down in November 1995, and launched on 1 June 1996. RheinVision was delivered on 30 June. On 5 July she was christened in St. Goarshausen by Kirsten Treibisch, who called her after the Lorelei. Loreley was the fourth boat of the Köln-Düsseldorfer that bears this name. From July 6, the boat was employed in scheduled service on the Middle Rhine between Koblenz and Rüdesheim am Rhein. On 18 September 2003 Harald Schmidt aired his television show from aboard RheinVision.

In late September 2003, the level of the Rhine was extremely low. On 28 September RheinVision set out for a scheduled trip from Rüdesheim to Koblenz. Near the Lorelei, the rock whose name she bore, RheinVision (still called Lorely back then) hit the ground with both propellers. The damage rendered the boat unmaneuverable. The captain was able to reduce her speed with use of the bow propeller, but she was nevertheless beached near Rhine kilometer 553.7, while running at about 15 km/h. 41 of the 349 guests complained about injuries. 5 guests were hospitalized. The others were treated on site. A state investigation ruled out any technical defect, and the KD blamed the accident on the extremely low water level of only 1.44 m. On 25 November the government then released the boat for further service. However, RheinVision had suffered so much damage, that a new bow section was ordered at Shipyard De Hoop. The Kölner Werft in Mülheimer Hafen then joined this section to RheinVision.

In December 2008 RheinVision was sold to the 100% KD subsidiary KD Europe S.à r.l in Luxemburg. She was next registered in Valletta auf Malta in January 2009. All this was only an administrative reality, because RheinVision was never intended to go near Malta, and would stay on the Rhine.
