= MS Asbach (1996) =

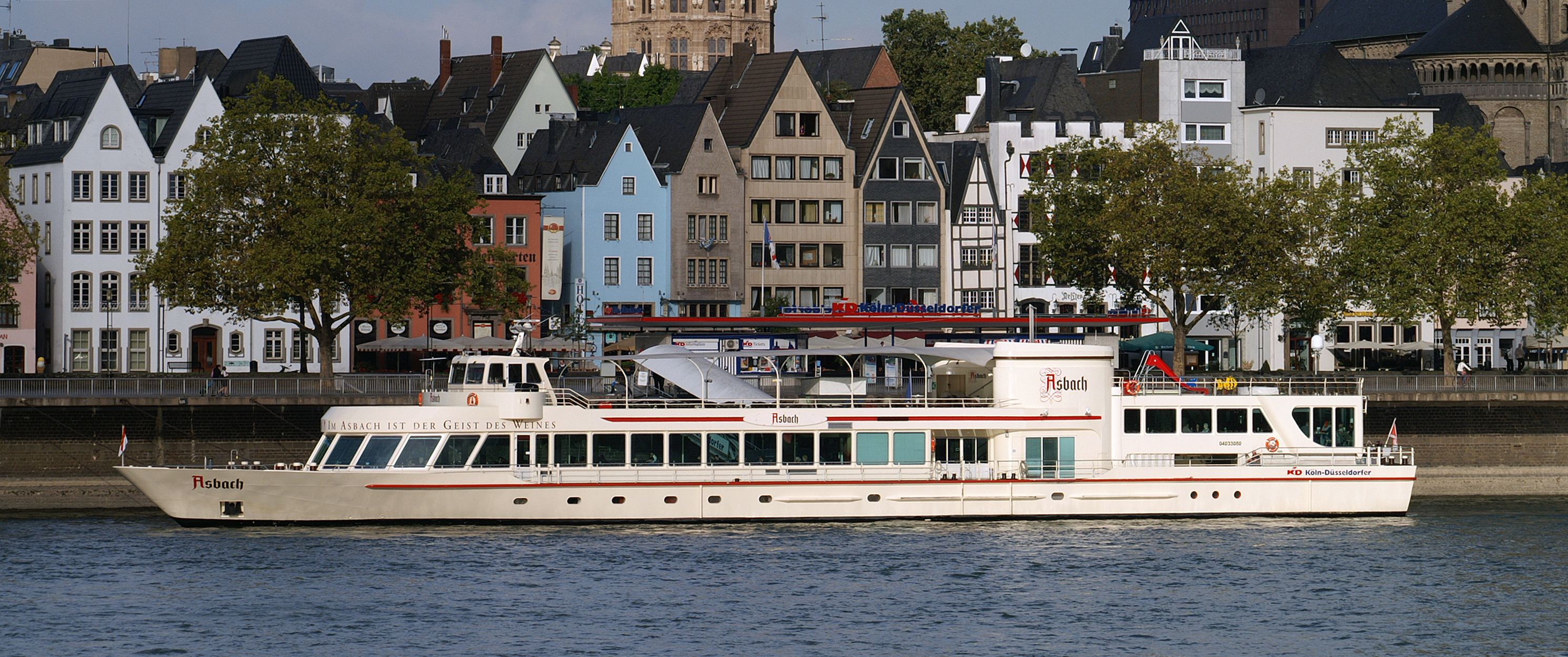
- Asbach in Köln

History
- Name: MS Marksburg (1996–2002); MS Asbach (2002)
- Owner: Köln-Düsseldorfer
- Builder: Shipyard De Hoop
- Cost: 8 Mio. DM
- Yard number: 365
- Laid down: November 1995
- Launched: 12 April 1996
- In service: 10 May 1996

General characteristics
- Displacement: 604t
- Length: 68,13 m
- Beam: 11,40 m
- Height: 10.30 m
- Draught: 1,25 m
- Installed power: kW/346
- Propulsion: 2 × MAN D2840LE, je 346 kW

MS Asbach is a tourist boat which is operated by the Köln-Düsseldorfer shipping line. Asbach primarily runs on schedule on the Middle Rhine between Koblenz and Mainz. In weekends she sails between Mainz and Köln. Asbach is the identical sister ship of MS Loreley.

== Boat characteristics ==
=== Boat description ===
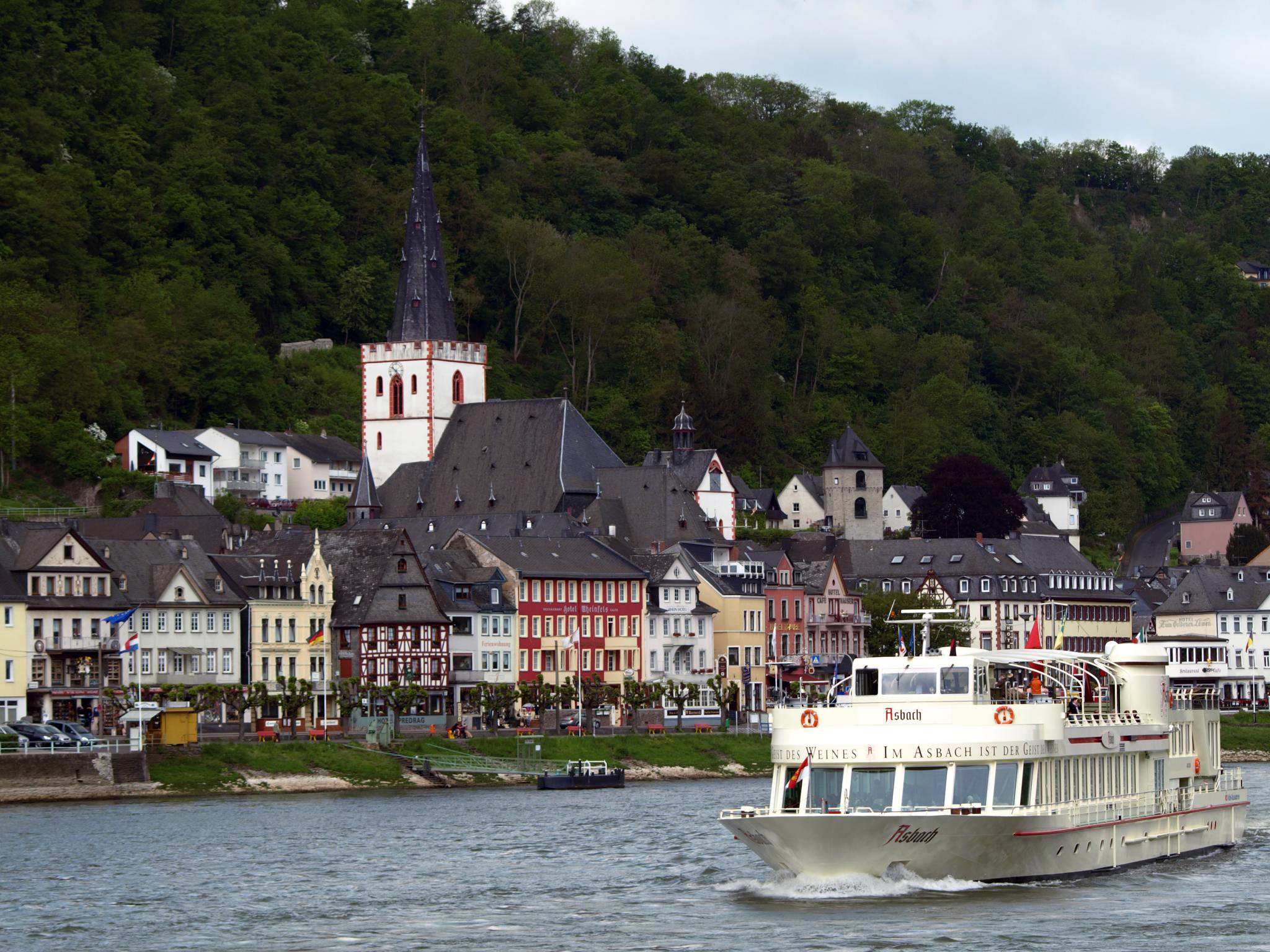
Asbach near Sankt Goar

Asbach is a three deck passenger ship with two large cabins on the main deck. In the regular configuration the front cabin accommodates 278 guests, and the somewhat higher rear cabin with bar accommodates 141 guests. Below the rear main cabin is a deck of only 1.40 m high, which is used to store bicycles. The main upper deck can accommodate 150 guests, and can be covered if the sun is too bright. The stern upper deck is a playground for children.

On the lower deck near the bow, there are 6 crew cabins on each side. Behind that, the boat's kitchen is situated, and behind that, the boat's wardrobe, toilets and office. A stair connects these parts of the boat to the main deck. Further to the stern are cool stores, general storage rooms, and the engine room. These parts are connected to the main deck by stairs only accessible to the boat's staff. Between the lower deck and the keel are tanks for drinking water, fuel and waste.

All stern decks are accessible for handicapped persons through a special facility. The useful surface of the boat is about 630 m^{2}. The height of the decks is 2.20 to 3 m. Maximum passenger capacity is 600 people.

=== Technical characteristics ===
Asbach has two V-10-Zylinder-Diesel engines of 346 kW of Baureihe MAN D2840LE. These turn two Aquamaster propellers of the Rauma US381/1500 typ. The bow propeller by De Gerlien van Time has its own 230 kW strong MAN engine. The boat is 68.13 m long, 11.40 m wide and 10.30 m high. When fully loaded, draft is still only 1.25 m.

== Service ==
=== Construction ===
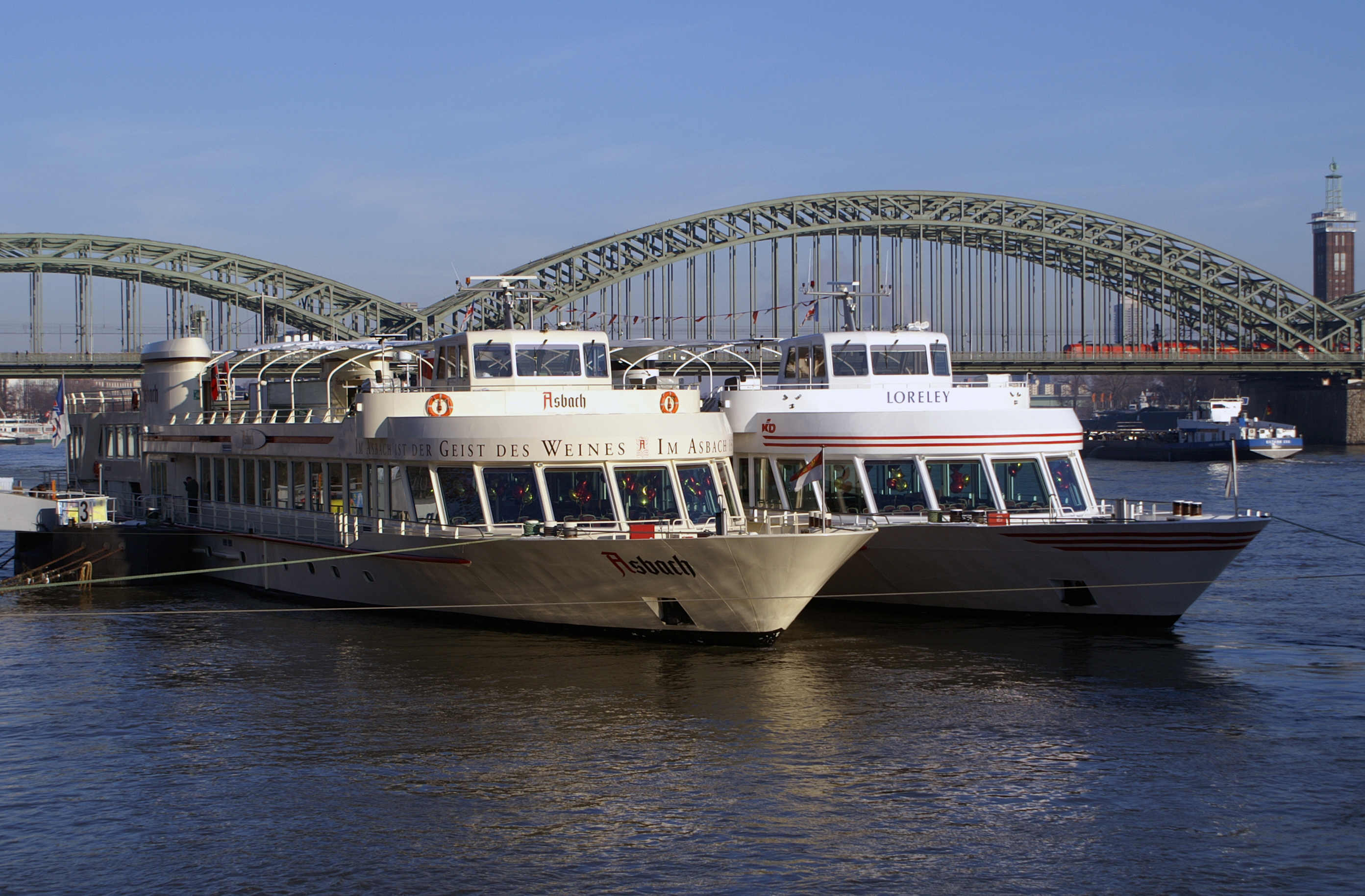
Asbach and her sister Loreley in Köln

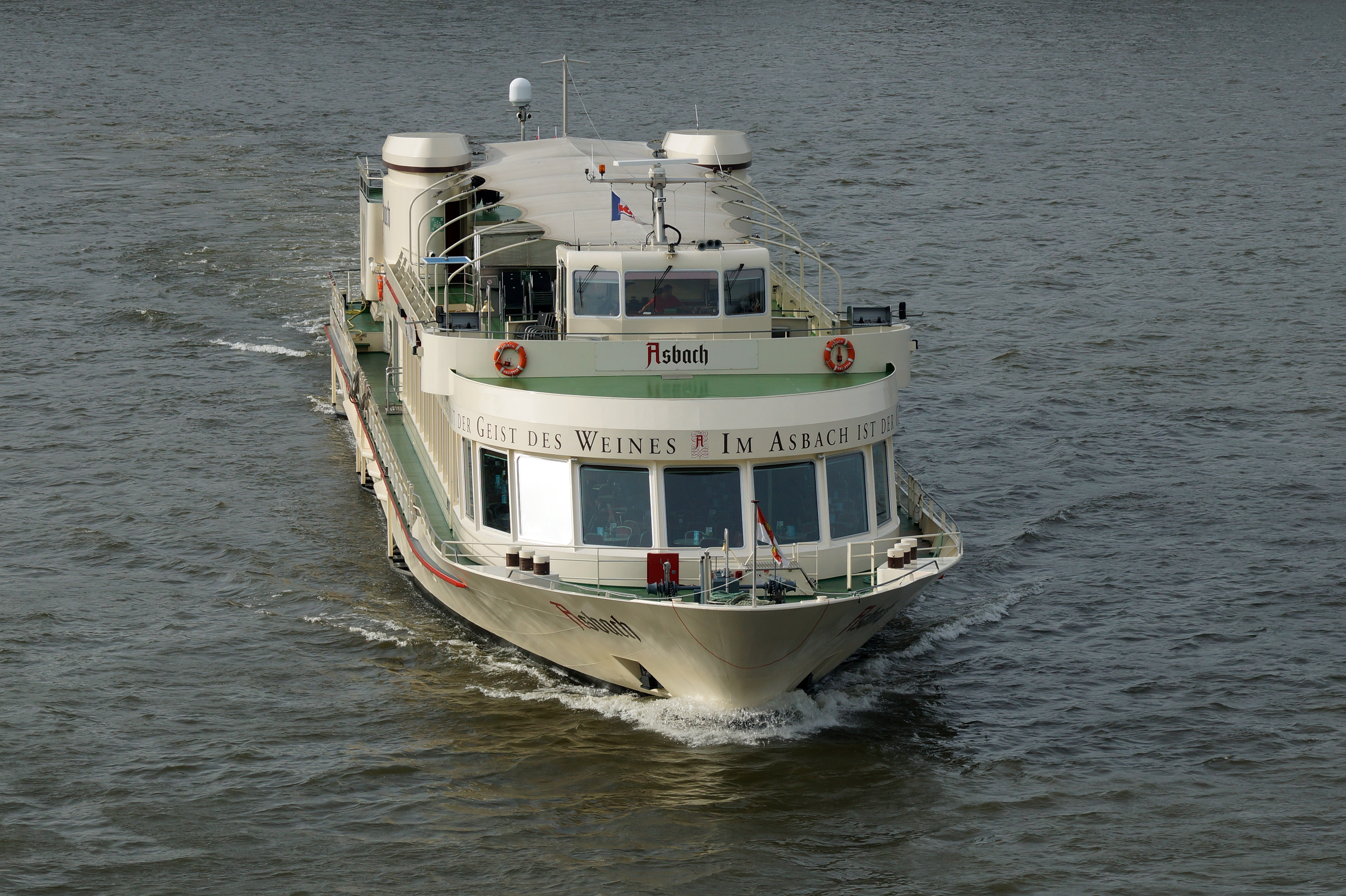
Sailing near Köln

Asbach was built as Marksburg by the Dutch Shipyard De Hoop in Rijnwaarden in 1995 and 1996. She was laid down in November 1995. Her launch on 12 April 1996 was bothered by an extremely low water level. Therefore, the shipyard attached a pontoon of about 10 m long to the stern, but this did not prevent Asbach from hitting the bottom during launch. The builder delivered the boat on 28 April 1996. On 2 and 3 May Marksburg made her trial runs between Köln-Niehl and Bad Salzig. On the morrow she made a regular trip from Bad Breisig to Mainz. The Köln-Düsseldorfer was now quite certain that the boat was OK, and that her sailing qualities had not ben adversely affected by the launch incident.

On 9 May 1996 Tilla von Golz, manager of the German Castles Association which has its offices in the Marksburg in Braubach christened the boat as Marksburg. At the same moment the Köln-Düsseldorfer accepted delivery of the boat. From 10 May Marksburg started regular service, primarily between Koblenz and Rüdesheim am Rhein.

=== Renamed ===
In earl 2002 Marksburg was renamed Asbach, due to a deal with the Rüdesheim company that makes Asbach Uralt a local Brandy. Somewhat later Asbach was also restyled in that company's colors. In December 2008 Asbach was sold to the shipping line's 100% subsidiary KD Europe S.à r.l in Luxemburg. In January 2009 she was registered in Valletta, Malta. Marksburg still sails the Rhine, and is regularly maintained in the harbor of Cologne.
