= Dampfschiffahrts-Gesellschaft für den Nieder- und Mittelrhein =

Joint-stock company in Germany

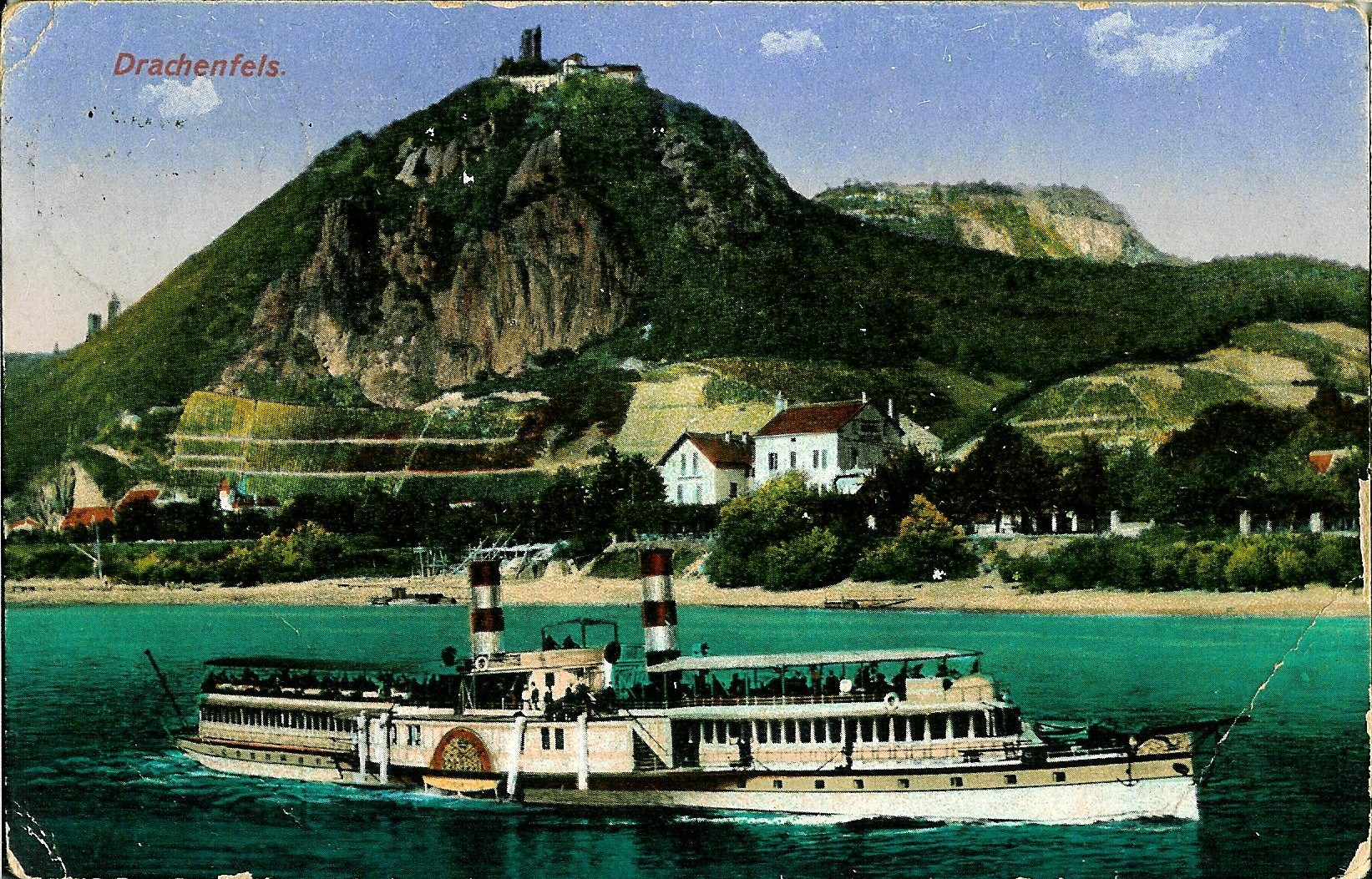
- Postcard of the DGNM Drachenfels with the eponymous mountain (1916)
- Industry: Shipping line
- Founded: 1836
- Defunct: Merged into the Köln-Düsseldorfer in 1967
- Headquarters: Düsseldorf, Germany
- Key people: Daniel von der Heydt

The Dampfschiffahrts-Gesellschaft für den Nieder- und Mittelrhein (DGNM) was a shipping line and joint-stock company with headquarters in Düsseldorf. Its steamboats sailed on the Rhine between Rotterdam and Mannheim. It was a public company in the 19th century. In 1853 it founded the partnership Kölnische und Düsseldorfer Gesellschaft für Rhein-Dampfschiffahrt with the Preußisch-Rheinischen Dampfschiffahrts Gesellschaft. In 1967 both companies merged into the Köln-Düsseldorfer Deutsche Rheinschiffahrt A.G.

== History ==
=== The competition ===
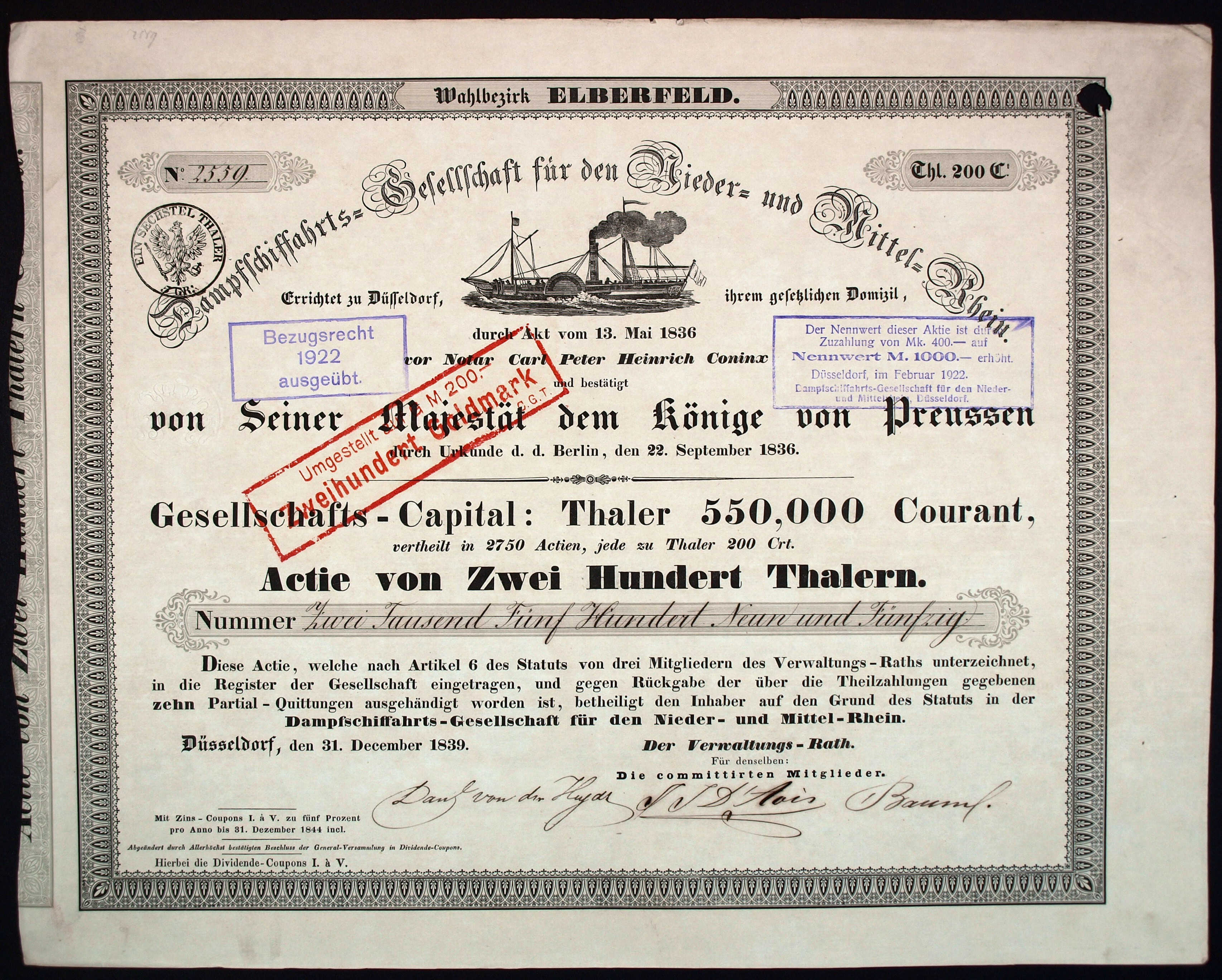
Share of the company issued on 31 December 1839

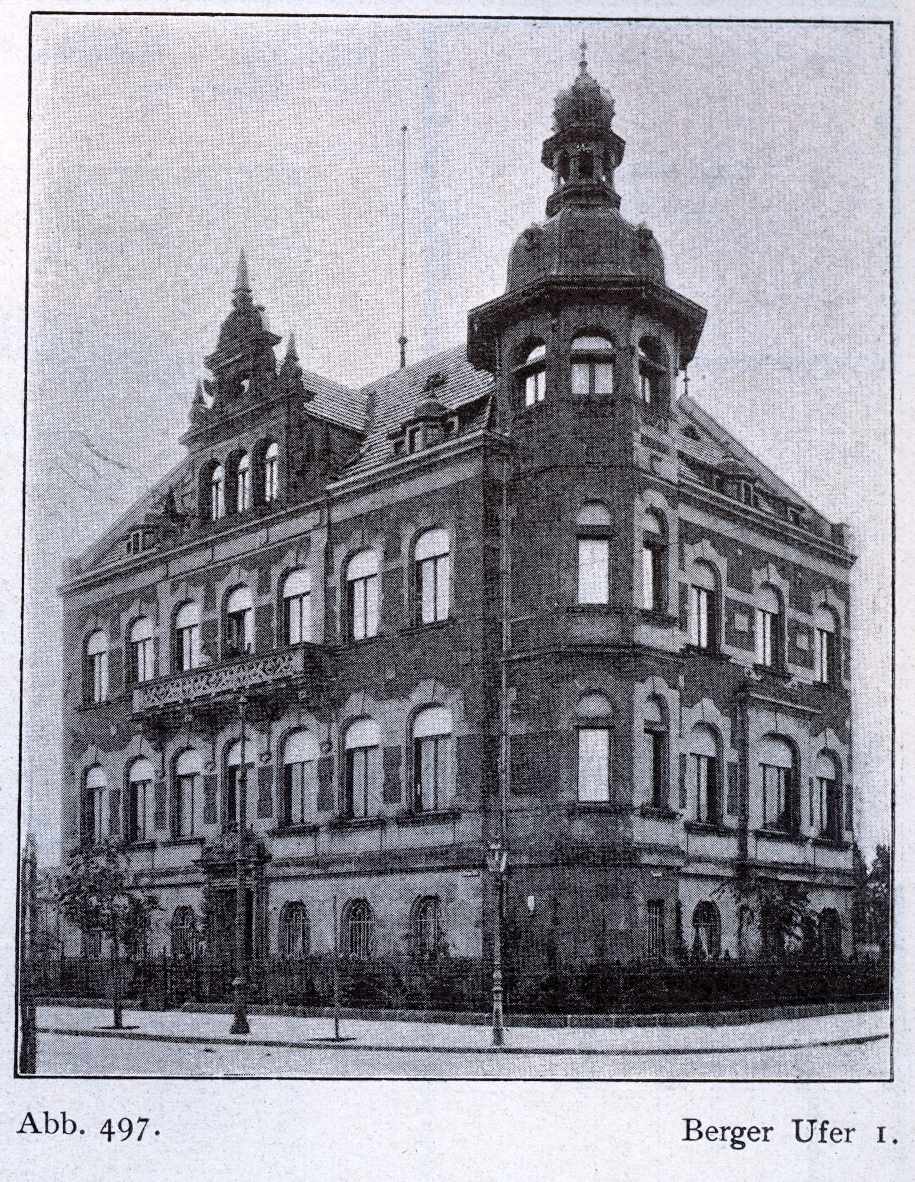
Company headquarters at Berger Ufer 1 in Düsseldorf

On 3 October 1825 the Preußisch-Rheinische Dampfschiffahrt-Gesellschaft (PRDG) was founded by merchants from Cologne. At about the same time, the Dampfschiffahrtsgesellschaft von Rhein und Main (DGRM) was founded in Mainz. Together with the Nederlandsche Stoomboot Maatschappij, these companies then divided the market for shipping on the Rhine amongst themselves. Competition was prevented by the governments on the Rhine. When shipping on the Rhine became more or less free, the British General Steam Navigation Company wanted to enter the shipping market on the Rhine, and offered a lot of capital.

=== The DGNM is founded ===
The joint-stock company Dampfschiffahrts-Gesellschaft für den Nieder- und Mittelrhein zu Düsseldorf was approved for an unlimited duration on 22 September 1836. Among the founders was Daniel von der Heydt. The share capital had a nominal value of 550,000 Thaler and was divided over 2,750 shares of 200 Thaler. The shares were listed on the Kölner Börse. In 1868 the company had a gross revenue of 303,000 Thaler and made a net profit of 71,000 Talern.

In 1853 DGNM created a partnership with the Preußisch-Rheinischen Dampfschiffahrts-Gesellschaft. It became known as the Köln-Düsseldorfer, but as regards accounting and in a legal sense, the companies remained separate entities. The trick of the partnership was that it made a single offer to the public, and so eliminated the internal competition between the partners. The partnership would finally become the Köln-Düsseldorfer Deutsche Rheinschiffahrt AG in 1967.

Carl Dietze (1824-1896) was chief executive of the company for a very long time.

== Company headquarters at Berger Ufer 1 ==
The since disappeared company headquarters were at Berger Ufer 1 (after 1945 Mannesmannufer) in Düsseldorf. The 1898 building by Klein & Richard Dörschel was showcased by the Architekten- und Ingenieurverein Düsseldorf. The basement held the quarters for the concierge and Registratur. The registratur was connected to the office on the main floor. Here were the offices of the supervisory board, and the offices of the Vorstandsbeamten. The chief executive lived on the upper floor of the building. The main view from the corner building and its protruding tower offered a view of the Rhine. The brick façade of the building had been made in the revival style of the Northern Renaissance.
