= Lorelei Fountain =

Fountain in the Bronx, New York

Heinrich Heine Fountain
- Lorelei Fountain
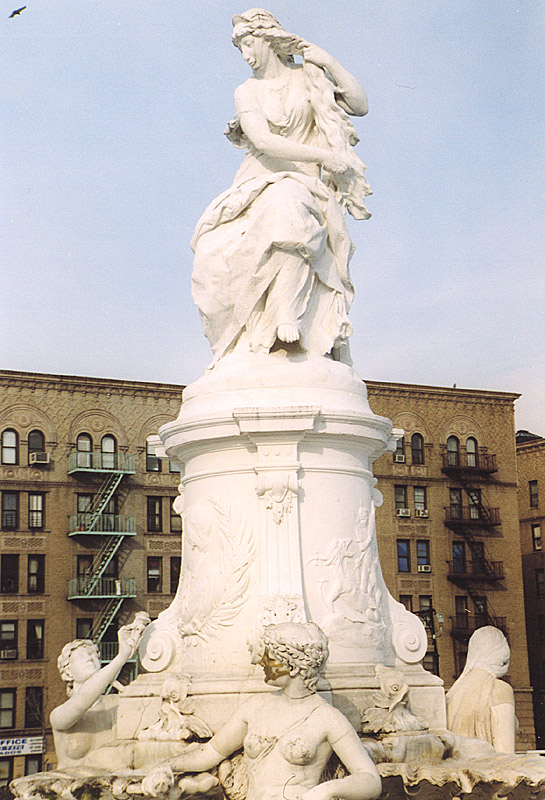
- Artist: Ernst Herter
- Completion date: 8 July 1899
- Medium: white marble
- Subject: Lorelei
- Dimensions: 580 cm (19 feet); 1,050 cm diameter (34.6 feet)
- Location: Joyce Kilmer Park, The Bronx, New York City; 40°49′39″N 73°55′23.48″W
- Owner: New York City Department of Parks and Recreation
- Website: www.nycgovparks.org/parks/joyce-kilmer-park/monuments/700

The Lorelei Fountain, also known as the Heinrich Heine Memorial, is a monument located on East 161st Street in the Concourse section of the Bronx, New York City, near the Bronx County Courthouse. It was designed by German sculptor Ernst Herter and created in 1896 out of Italian white marble in Laas, South Tyrol. The fountain was unveiled at its current location in 1899 and is dedicated to German poet and writer Heinrich Heine.

Heine had once written a poem devoted to the Lorelei, a feminine water spirit much like a mermaid that is associated with the Lorelei rock in St. Goarshausen, Germany. The monument was originally to be placed in Heine's hometown of Düsseldorf, but antisemitism and nationalist propaganda in the German Empire precluded its planned completion on Heine's 100th birthday in 1897.

== Design and location ==
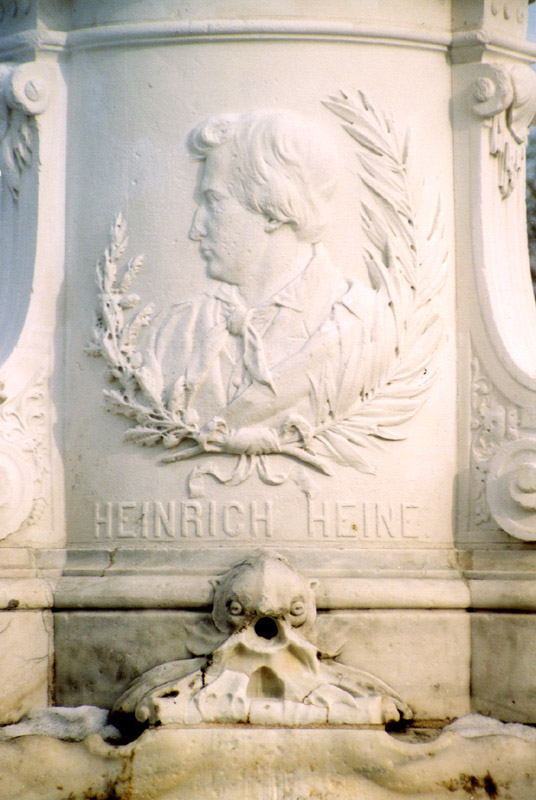
The base

Above the fountain bowl situated in Joyce Kilmer Park, bounded by the Grand Concourse, Walton Avenue, 164th Street, and 161st Street, a life-size figure of Lorelei rises, supported on a base; the monument stands at the southern end of the Joyce Kilmer Park and is near 161st Street and the Grand Concourse, across from the Bronx County Courthouse. Three mermaids sit in the fountain bowl resting at the base, which is supported by three volutes. Located on the front side of the base, between two volutes, is a relief of a profile portrait of Heine. Below that is the signature of the poet. The figure to the left of the relief, symbolizing poetry, sits to the right of the figure symbolizing satire; on the back is a figure signifying melancholy. Between the three figures are three dolphin heads. In addition to the Heine-portrait, there is a depiction of a naked boy with dunce-cap pointing his pen at a dragon, symbolizing humor. On a third relief, a sphinx hugs "a naked young man in the kiss of death".

The Lorelei is dressed, according to Herter's biographer Brigitte Hüfler, in a non-contemporary garb. In her cleavage, she wears a necklace, and her embroidered jacket is pulled over the hips.

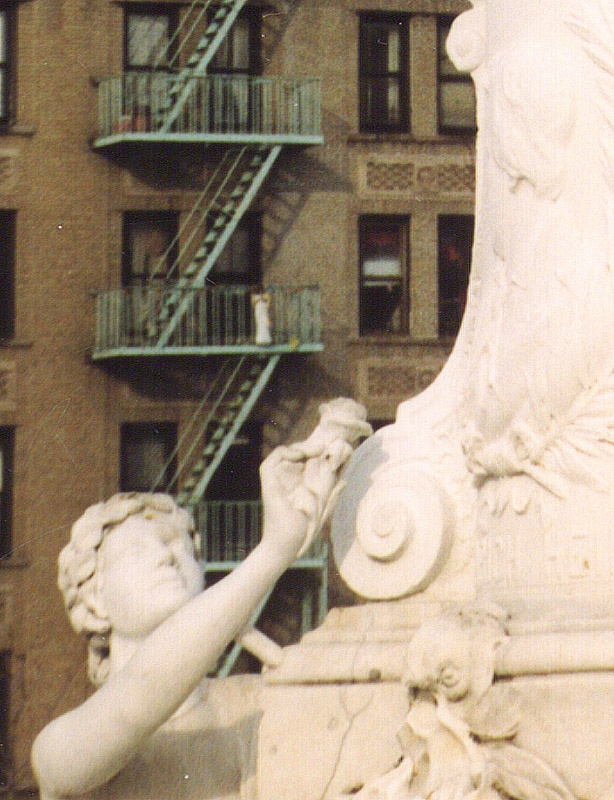
The relief symbolizing poetry

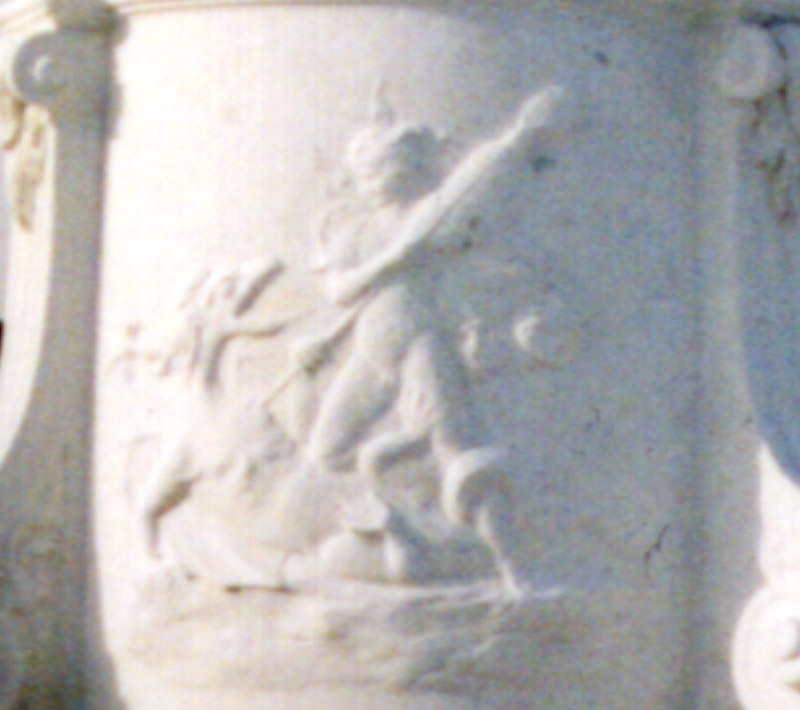
The relief symbolizing humor

The figure symbolizing poetry is the only one of the three figures that faces the relief of Heine. It also faces towards a rose, which is supposed to express a particularly intimate relationship between poetry and Heine. From the right of the Heine-relief is the figure of satire, which turns her upper body towards Heine. In the back of the monument is positioned the "melancholy". The hair of the figure is long and unadorned, and she looks down sadly.

The reliefs on the barrel bridge the space between the auxiliary figures and the Lorelei. The Sphinx is holding a naked young man and gives him probably the kiss of death, because the Riddle of the Sphinx has not been resolved. The humorous relief signifying killing a dragon could be interpreted as a matter of prejudice and public opinion. Heine's relief is embraced with a palm and a spruce twig.

== History ==
=== Origin ===
In the autumn of 1887, a committee for the establishment of a Heine Memorial was formed in Düsseldorf. The aim of the initiative was to unveil the monument to the 100th birthday of the poet, in 1897. The Munich-based poet Paul Heyse participated in a call to the committee, and, among other things, wrote to the Düsseldorf Gazette on November 2, 1887 in Düsseldorf Gazette. Following Düsseldorf's lead, other German cities formed committees to support the project. Even in New York there was interest in the project. The Austro-Hungarian Empress and Heine admirer Elisabeth also joined the Düsseldorf committee, and sent 50,000 marks toward the construction of the monument under the condition that the Berlin sculptor Ernst Herter would build it. In December 1887, Herter provided some designs for the monument.

On March 6, 1888, the Düsseldorf City Council decided to build a Heine monument at a tie of eleven to eleven votes, including the vote of the Mayor Heinrich Ernst Lindemann, who was also a member of the Memorial Committee. The city council was thus as divided as the German public, since the announcement of the monument plans sparked fierce debate. At the time of the vote, Herter already had a first plan for the monument, in that it was to contain a canopy. Since the Empress did not like this design, in May 1888 two further proposals came about: one depicting Heine sitting on a pedestal, the other with the current Lorelei fountain. The designs were submitted on June 30, 1888. While Elisabeth preferred the Heine-figure, Düsseldorf preferred the Lorelei Fountain.

Opposition to the monument formed almost immediately after the plans were released in the autumn of 1887. That year, two pamphlets were published, directed against Heine. In addition, several writers and newspapers wrote pieces defaming Heine. However, among some German journalists and writers, Heine was still popular and his plan was still supported.

By January 1889, the Empress withdrew her support. The project was thus temporarily shelved because public donations netted only 15,000 marks. However, since Herter had estimated a cost of 32 to 40,000 marks to build the monument, the artist now began to collect donations for the monument in its own right, but his efforts were unsuccessful. Important supporters also resigned from the Düsseldorf Memorial Committee, including Paul Heyse and Mayor Lindemann. Due to limited funding, the committee decided to grant Herter the contract for another draft. In December 1892, the Committee and sculptor signed a contract for the pedestal.

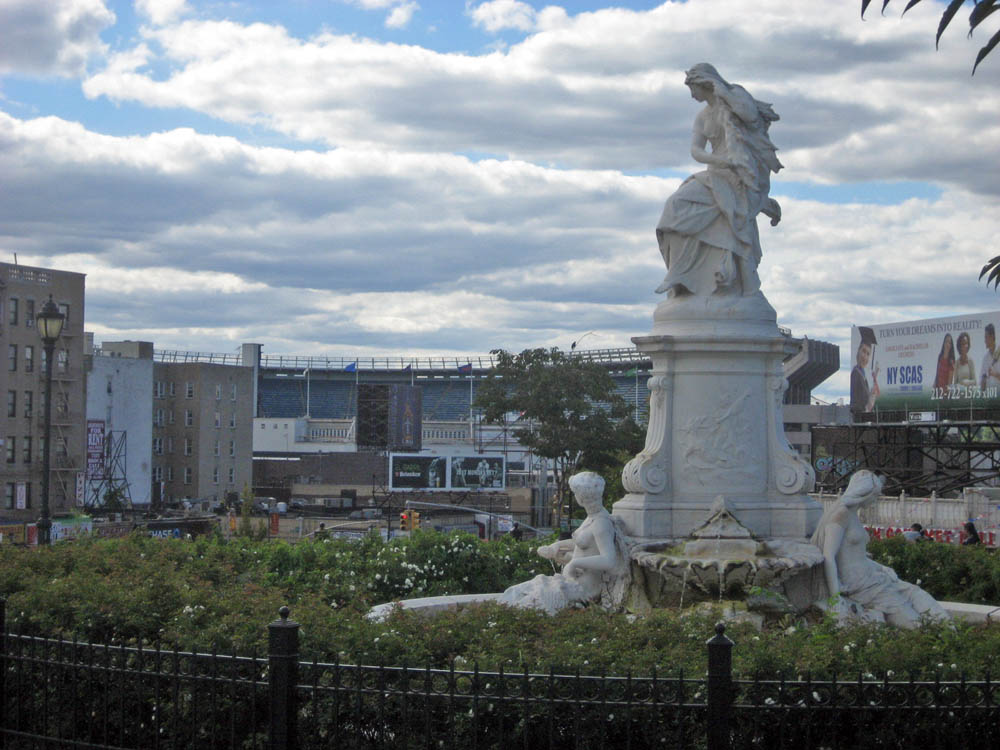
The monument with the former Yankee Stadium in the background, 2007

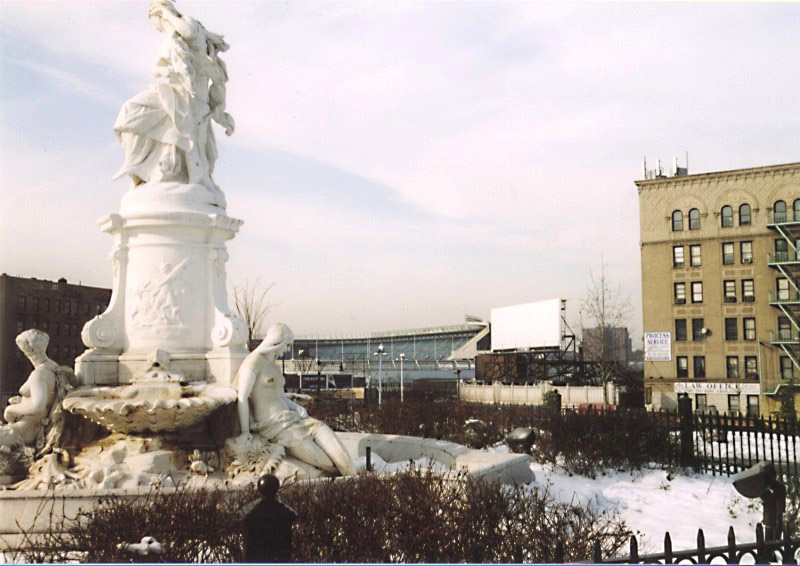
The monument with the former Yankee Stadium in the background, 2003

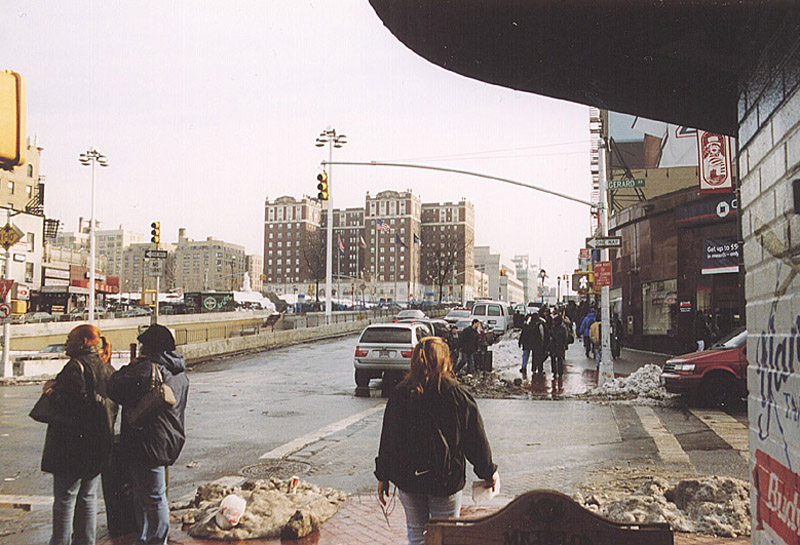
East 161st Street looking east; the monument is to the left outside this picture

=== Initial placement attempts ===
After Düsseldorf's initial acceptance of the fountain in March 1888, the Committee announced on January 5, 1893 that the monument would be completed in 1895. On January 24, 1893, however, the project's construction permit was withdrawn since it was not covered by city laws, and also because of prevailing antisemitism in the German Empire at the time. The committee filed a lawsuit against the city for barring construction. Despite the setback in Düsseldorf, the cities of Frankfurt and Mainz (and Mayor of Mainz, Georg Oechsner, in particular) expressed interest. On July 10, 1893, the Mainz City Council authorized the erection of the monument, but the plan encountered strong opposition when Oeschner was ousted from his post. Newly-elected Mainz City Council members ultimately rejected the monument by a large majority on October 31, 1894.

=== Installation in New York City ===
After the monument failed to find a home within Germany, locations abroad were considered. By April 14, 1893, a German-American singing group called the Arion Society of New York had expressed support for its installation in the city. That same year, the Heine Memorial Association was formed by community members of Little Germany (including Carl Schurz and George Ehret) to advocate for the statue. Despite early setbacks due to the Panic of 1893, fundraising efforts to pool 100,000 German gold marks for the project eventually culminated in an event known as the Heine Memorial Fair held at the Lenox Lyceum on November 24, 1895.

While the monument enjoyed public support, the New York City Board of Parks rejected the project. Parks commissioners reportedly asked the government of Düsseldorf whether the monument had been refused in the latter only for political, and not also for artistic, reasons. The board also consulted with the National Sculpture Society, which called Heine monument's design "dry, weak and unconventional". The fountain was challenged not just on aesthetics, but also the Heine Association's desire to have it erected at the prominent Grand Army Plaza entrance to Central Park (at the corner of 5th Avenue and 59th Street). Just two years earlier, a monument to Chester A. Arthur had also been rejected at the same location. The New York Times described the monument as an "example of academic mediocrity, worthy of erection, but not worthy of erection as our chief municipal ornament".

With such clear opposition to the project being sited in Grand Army Plaza, alternate locations were considered, including Brooklyn, Queens, and even Baltimore. On March 10, 1896, members of Tammany Hall ignored the Parks Commissioners' ruling on the project and requested approval from the New York City Board of Aldermen without specifying a precise location. By this point, at least two other private sites were offered by prominent members of New York's German-American community: one at William Steinway's Bowery Bay Beach park, and another at Starin's Glen Island park. At the suggestion of New York Republican party, the state created an art commission on March 4, 1896, which ultimately decided to place the monument in the Bronx. It was unveiled on July 8, 1899, at East 164th Street and Grand Concourse in the Bronx, to a crowd of 4,000 to 6,000 people, with Herter in attendance.

=== Vandalism and rehabilitation ===
The monument was, from the start, the subject of frequent abuse and vandalism; although the monument was guarded by police, in 1900, the mermaids' arms were cut off. Women of the Christian Association of Abstinence described the monument as "indecent" in a court case in February 1900; other sources considered the monument as a "pornographic spectacle". In 1940, the fountain was moved to the northern end of the park and partially repaired In the following decades, the vandalism subsided, but later, the heads of the female characters were cut off again, the monument sprayed all over with graffiti. In the 1970s, the fountain was considered the statue in New York most affected by vandalism and destruction.

Plans to completely restore and move the monument back to its original position were formed in 1987. The Municipal Art Society of New York launched an "Adopt a Monument" program, which rehabilitated about 20 monuments. However, because of the initially estimated cost of $275,000, the renewal was delayed. A visit to former North Rhine-Westphalia Prime Minister Johannes Rau in September 1989 netted a 50,000 mark donation; later, $700,000 was raised through private donations. The fountain was reopened on July 8, 1999 at East 161st Street and the Grand Concourse, three blocks from its original location.

== Cited sources ==
- Michele Bogart: The Politics of Urban Beauty, Chicago 2006.
- Brigitte Hüfler: Ernst Herter 1846–1917, Werk und Porträt eines Berliner Bildhauers, Berlin 1978.
- Paul Reitter: "Heine in the Bronx", in: The Germanic Review 74 (4), 1999, pp 327–336.
- Jeffrey L. Sammons: "The Restoration of the Heine Monument in the Bronx" in: The Germanic Review 74 (4), 1999, pp 337–339.
- Wolfgang Schedelberger: Heinrich Heine in der Bronx, in: Extra (Wochenend-Beilage zur Wiener Zeitung), December 11, 1998, p 5
- Dietrich Schubert: "Der Kampf um das erste Heine-Denkmal. Düsseldorf 1887–1893, Mainz 1893–1894, New York 1899", in: Wallraf-Richartz-Jahrbuch: Westdeutsches Jahrbuch für Kunstgeschichte 51, 1990, pp. 241–272.
- Dietrich Schubert: Jetzt wohin?“ Heinrich Heine in seinen verhinderten und errichteten Denkmälern, Köln 1999.
- "Heine in the Bronx", February 17, 2006
