= Ernst Herter =

German sculptor (1846–1917)

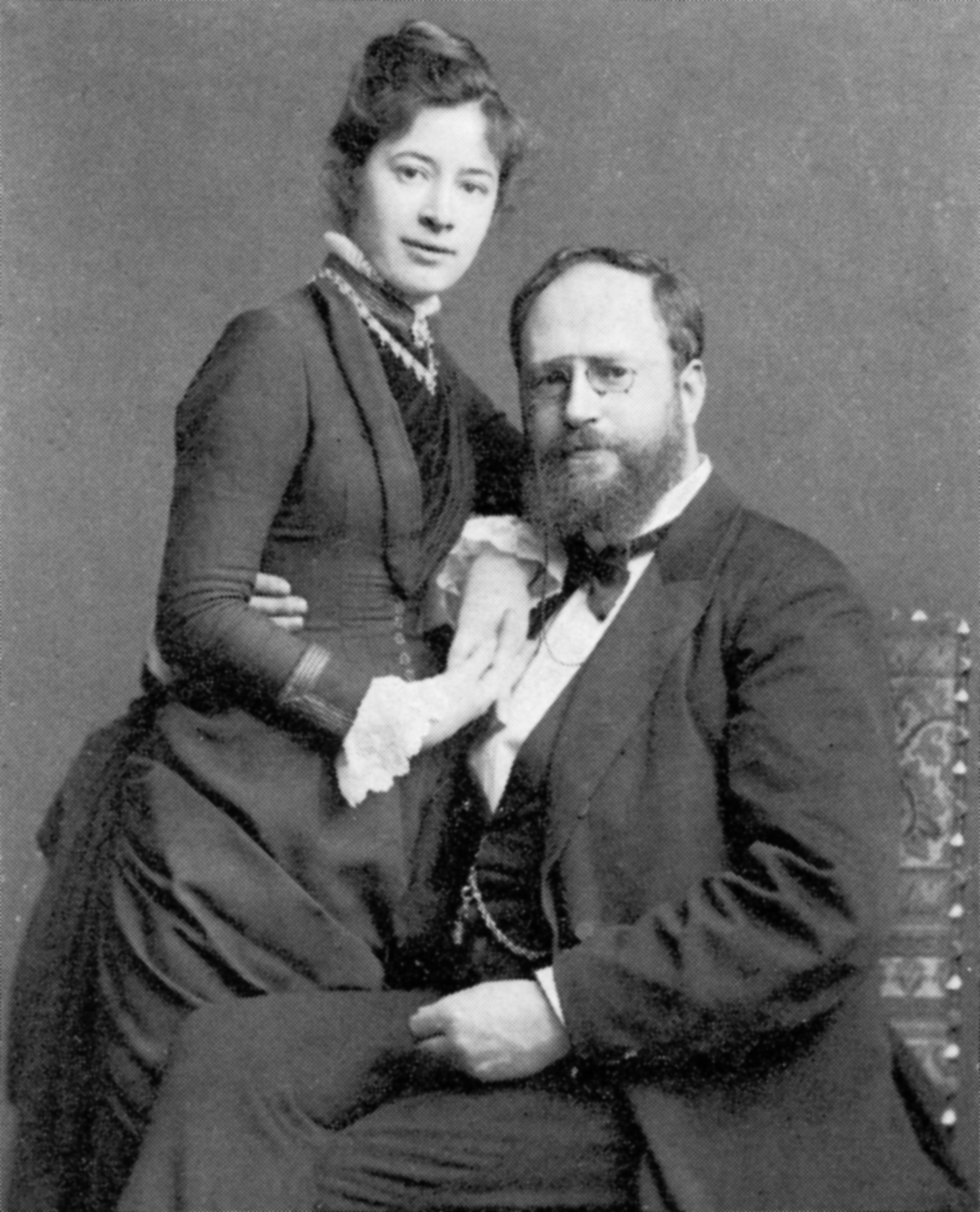
Ernst Herter and his wife Elisabeth, about 1885

Ernst Gustav Herter (14 May 1846, Berlin – 19 December 1917, Berlin) was a German sculptor. He specialized in creating statues of mythological figures.

== Life and work ==
Herter studied at the Academy of Arts in Berlin and later also as apprentice of Ferdinand August Fischer, Gustav Blaeser and Albert Wolff. In 1869 he created his own studio. In 1875, he made a study trip to Italy. Professor Herter was a member of the Prussian Academy of Arts.

On 8 July 1899, Herter was present in New York when his Heinrich Heine memorial sculpture, known as the Lorelei Fountain, was unveiled in The Bronx, New York City. The Lorelei Fountain was originally intended for Heine's city of birth, Düsseldorf, to mark the centenary of his birth. This project was squelched due to the antisemitic and nationalistic sentiment that pervaded the German Reich at that time.

Among his most famous works is Sterbender Achill (Dying Achilles), created in Berlin in 1884. The statue was acquired by the Empress of Austria and became the centerpiece at her palace Achilleion in Corfu, Greece. His second original sculpture of Dying Achilles is in Poland in Elbląg at Łączności street opposite the City Hall. It was a gift from the German Ministry of Culture and Arts.

Herter was the subject of the book by Georg Malkowsky "Ernst Herter, Beitrag zurGeschichte der Berliner Bildhauerschule" published in 1906. On page 57 appears the photograph of the statue "Der Ruhende Alexander" (The Resting Alexander). A marble version of this statue is the subject of an open restitution claim. See Link to pending claim in References.

== Selected sculptures ==
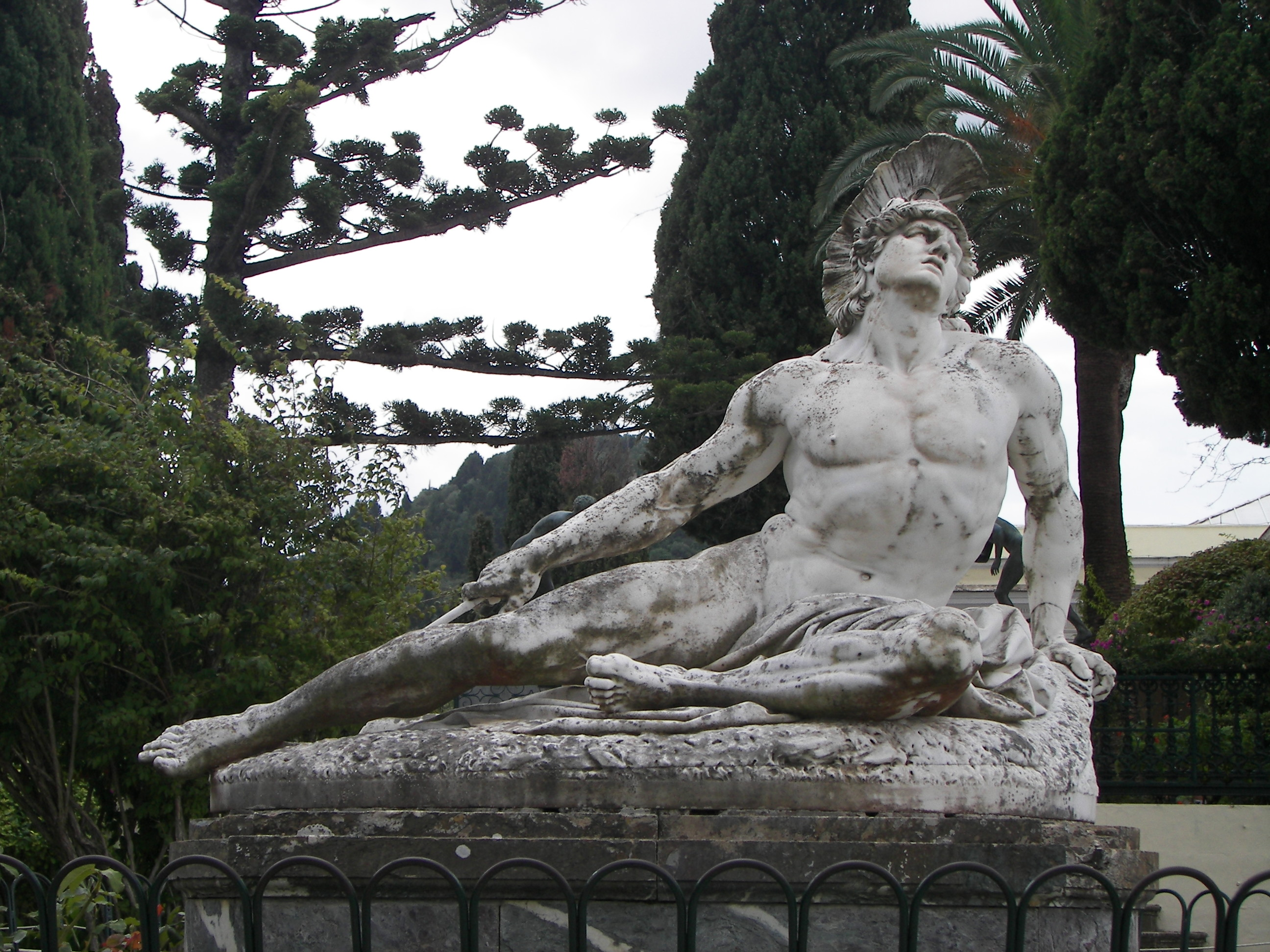
Dying Achilles, Achilleion Palace,
Corfu, Greece

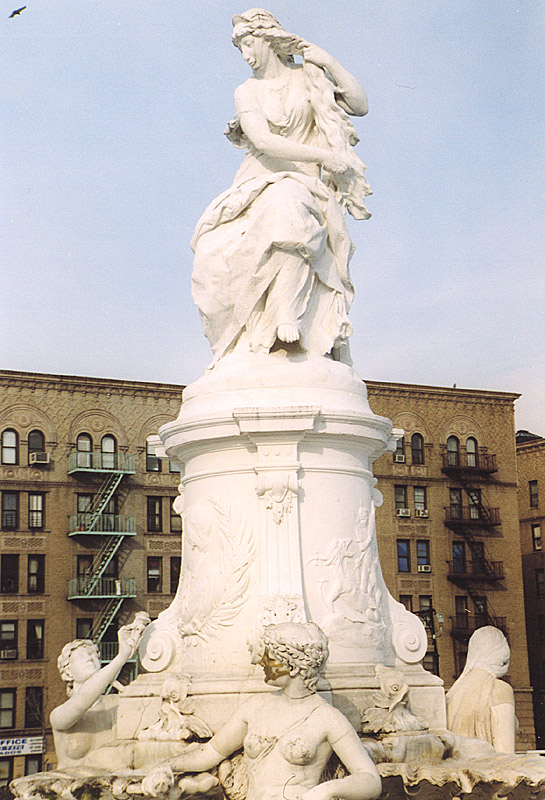
The Lorelei Fountain, The Bronx,
New York City

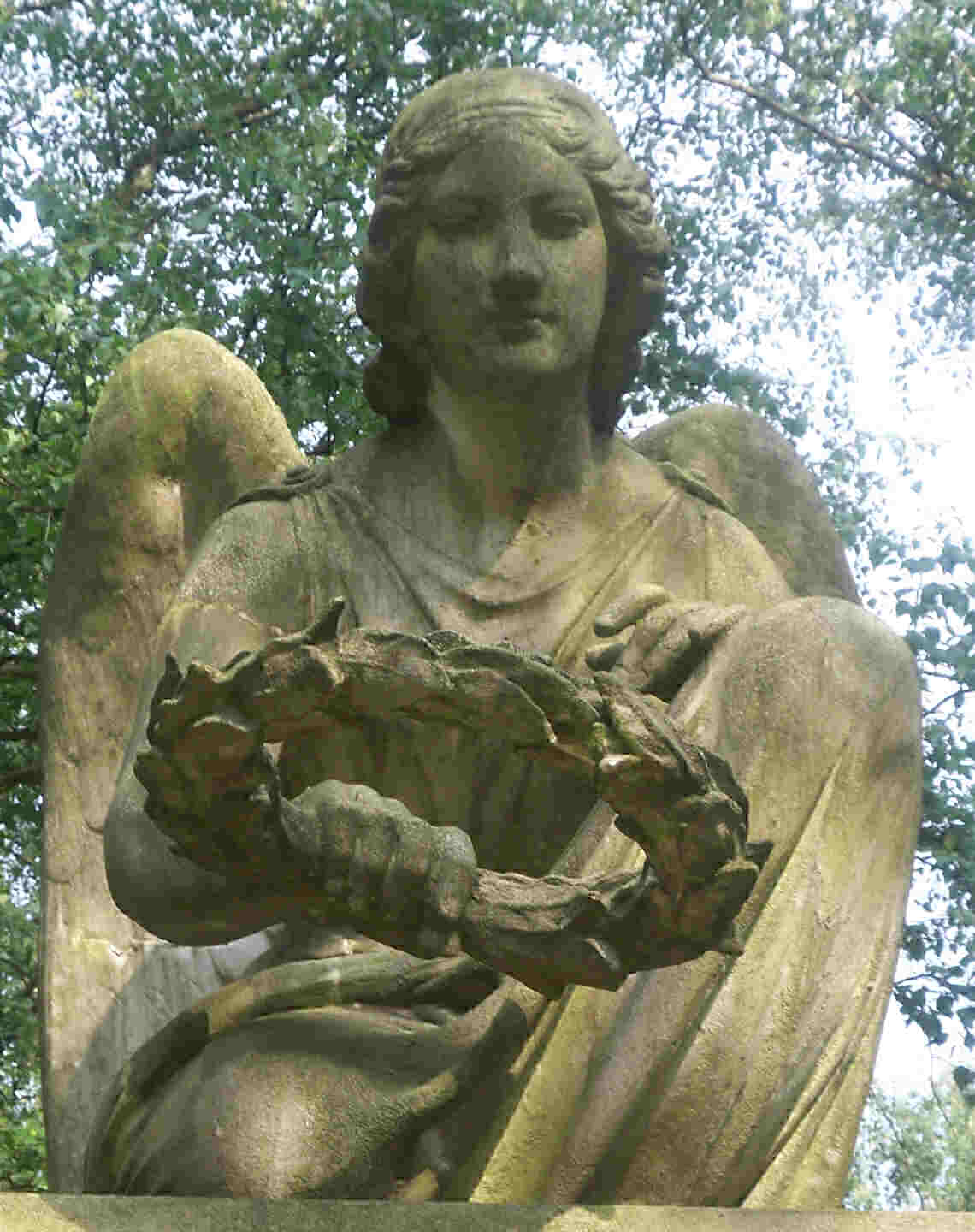
War Memorial, 1875, Berlin-Spandau

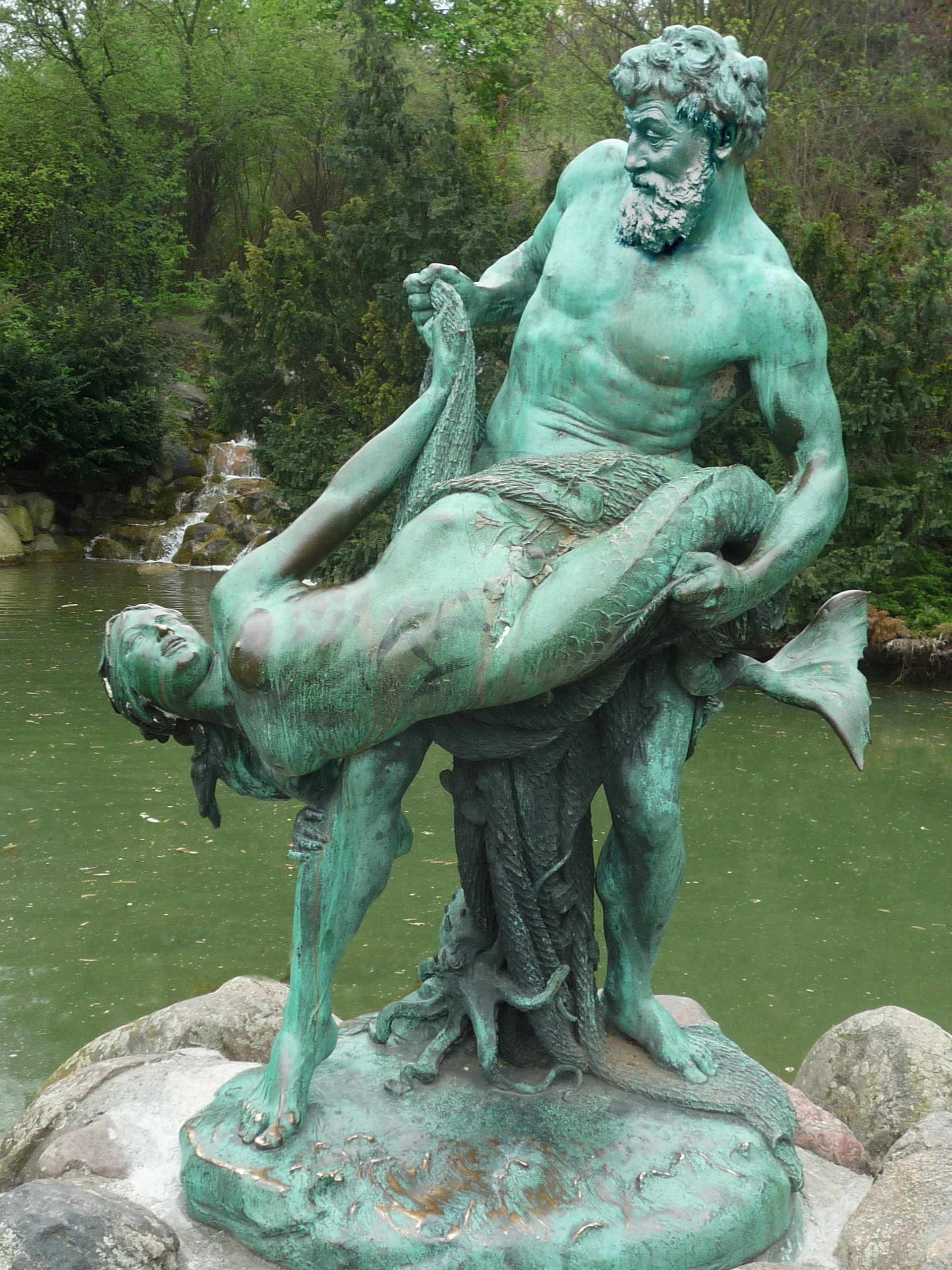
The Rare Catch, 1896
Viktoriapark Berlin

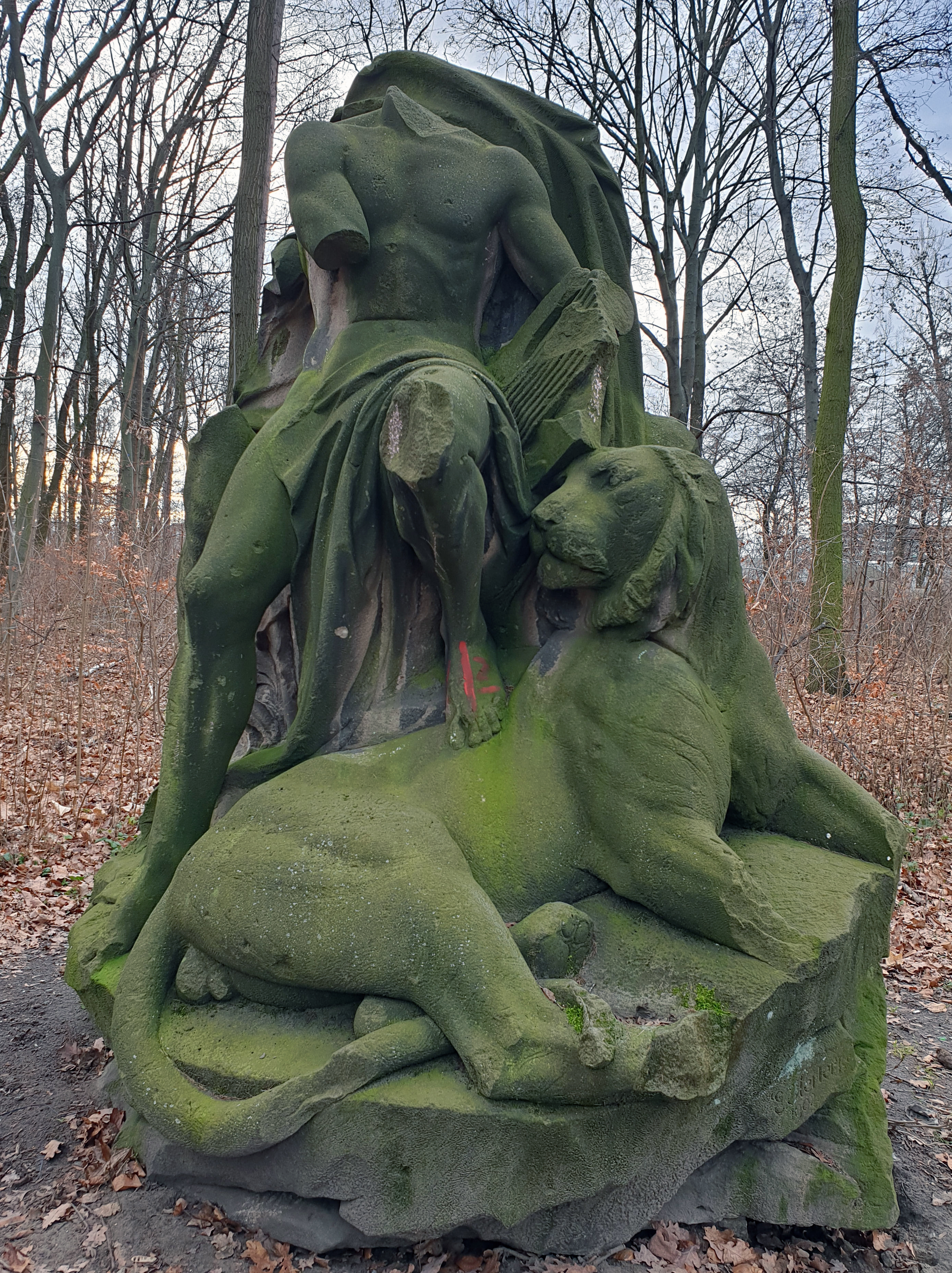
Orpheus, 1902
Berlin-Wedding

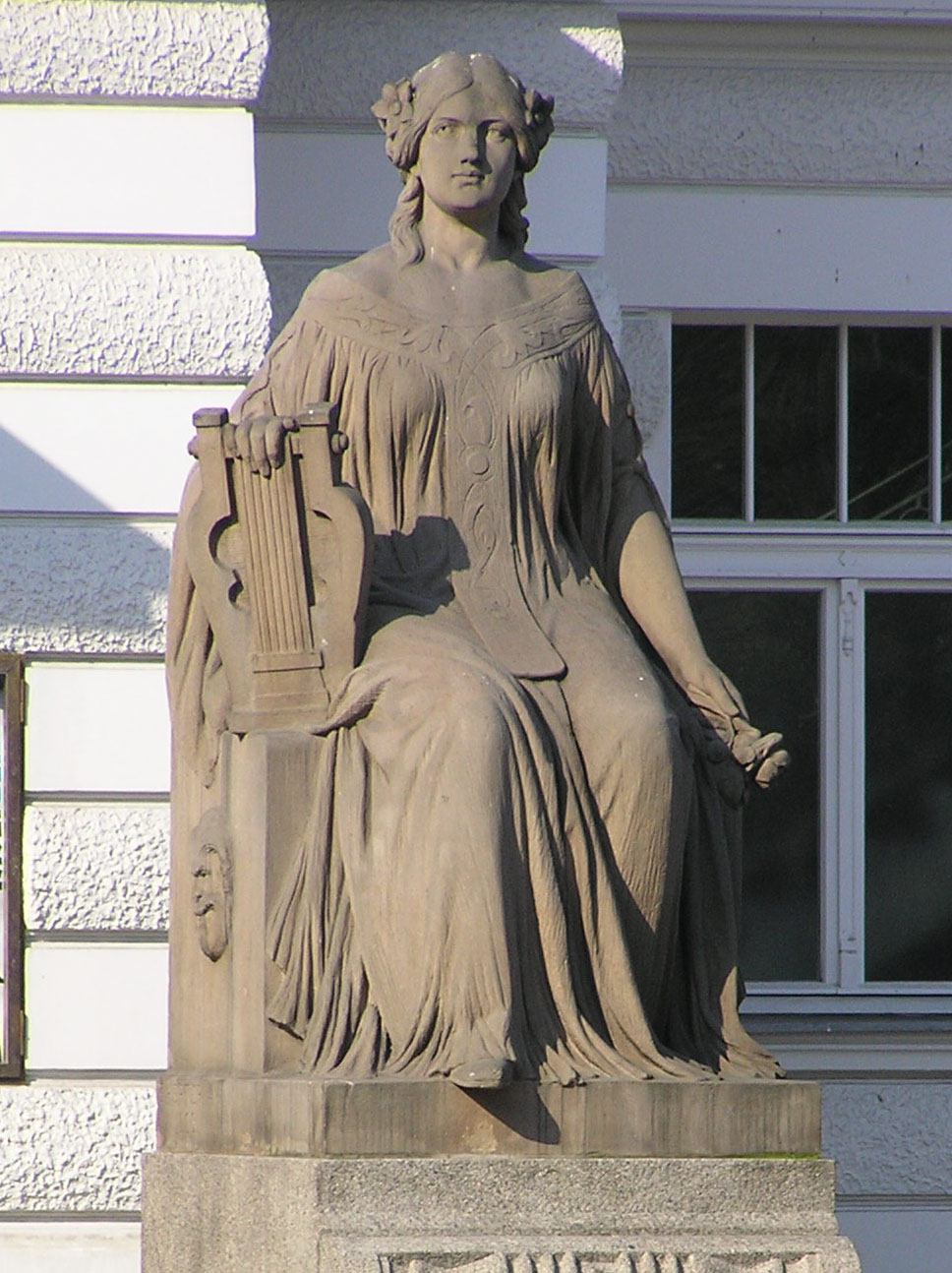
The Muse Terpsichore, 1909, Thorn
