= Köln-Düsseldorfer =

River cruise operator based in Cologne, Germany

Köln-Düsseldorfer Deutsche Rheinschiffahrt GmbH
- Type: GmbH
- Industry: Transportation
- Predecessors: Preussisch-Rheinischen Dampfschiffahrtsgesellschaft (PRDG) and Dampfschiffahrts-Gesellschaft für den Nieder- und Mittelrhein (DGNM)
- Founded: 11 June 1826
- Headquarters: Cologne, Germany
- Products: River cruises
- Number of employees: ~200
- Website: k-d.com

Köln-Düsseldorfer (KD) is a river cruise operator based in Cologne, Germany. The company operates a total of 15 day trip vessels on the Rhine, Main and Moselle rivers. The famous KD steamer line operated on the Rhine with steamers and tourist boats. The Lorelei rock was a famed day outing for pleasure seekers.

== History ==
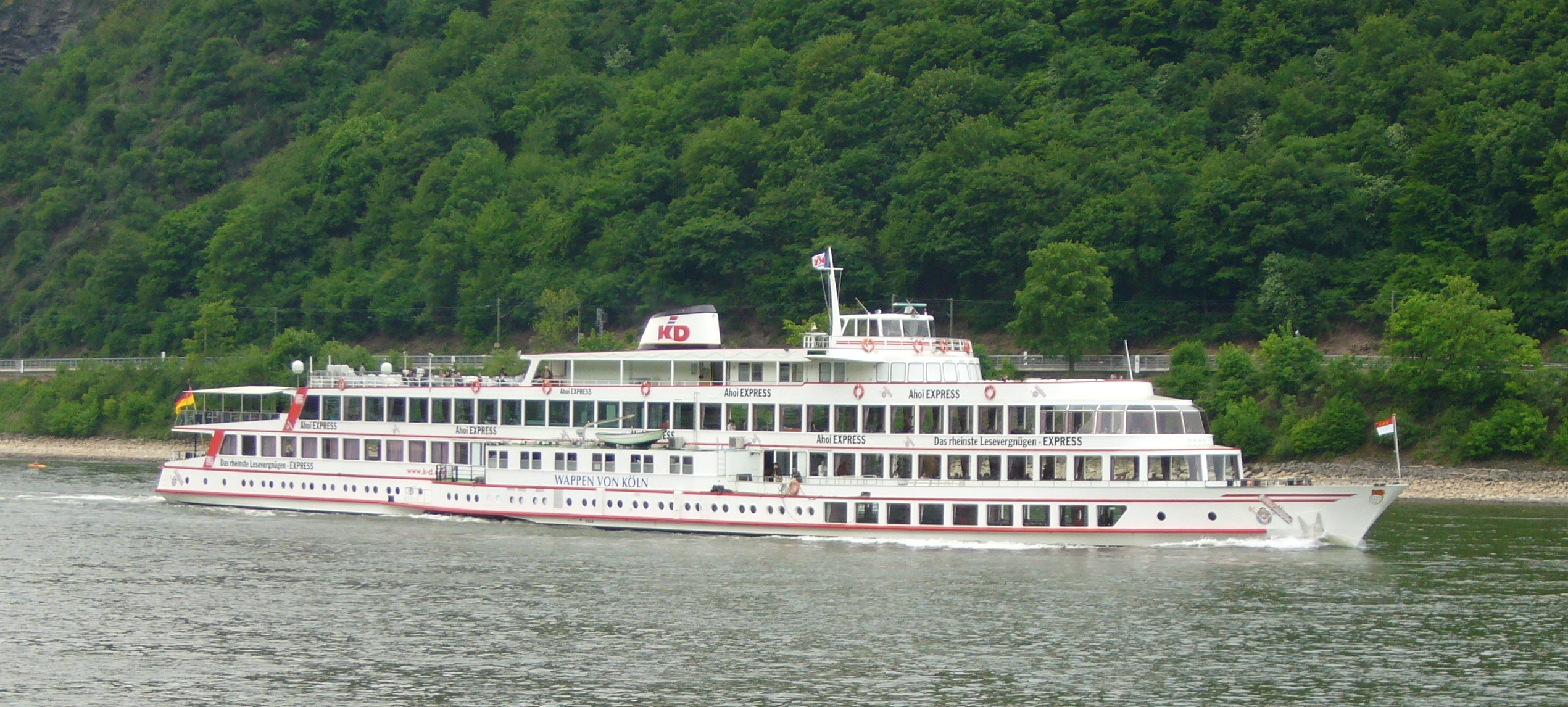
MS Wappen von Köln, 2007

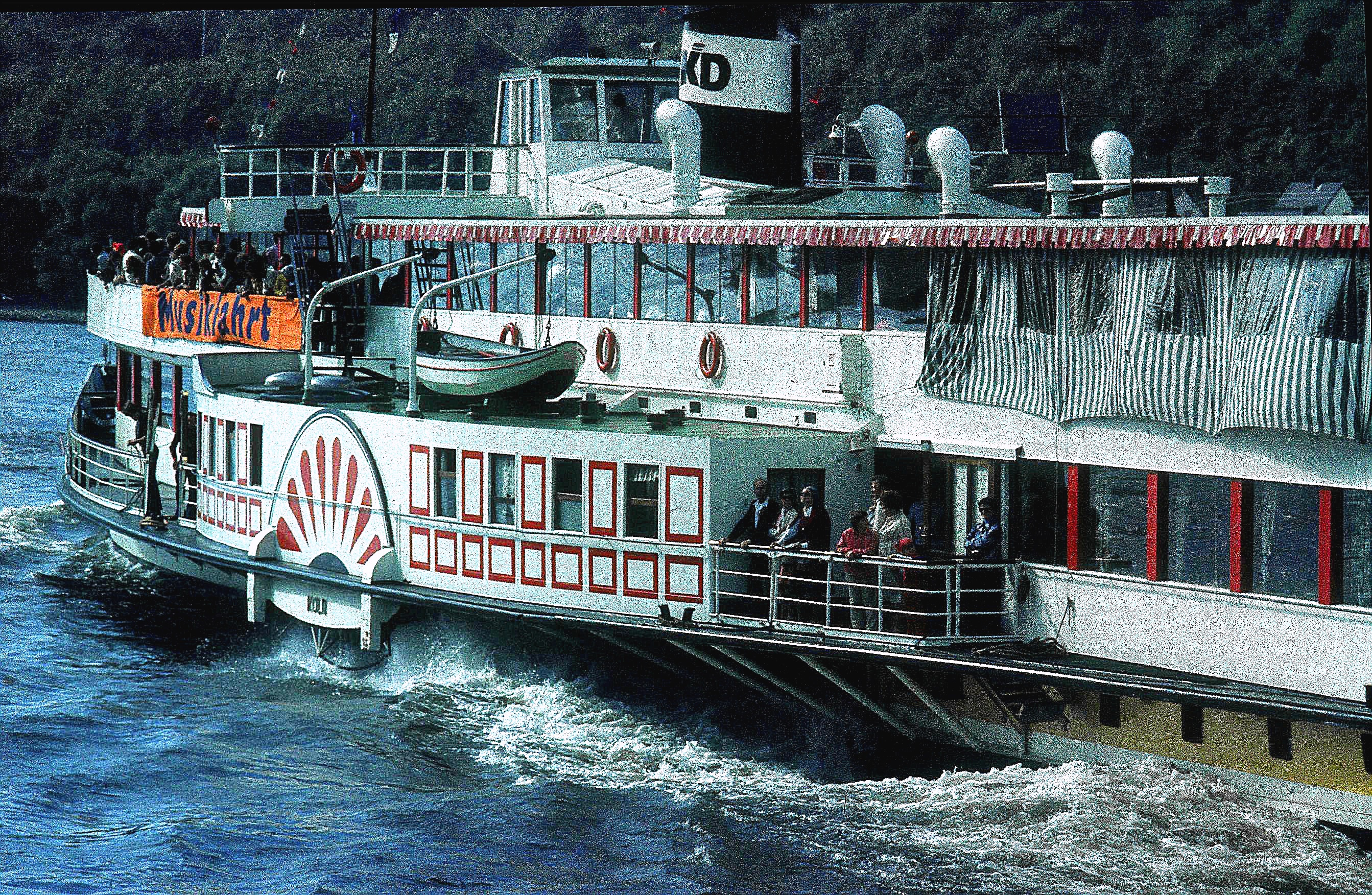
Goethe paddle steamer, 1975

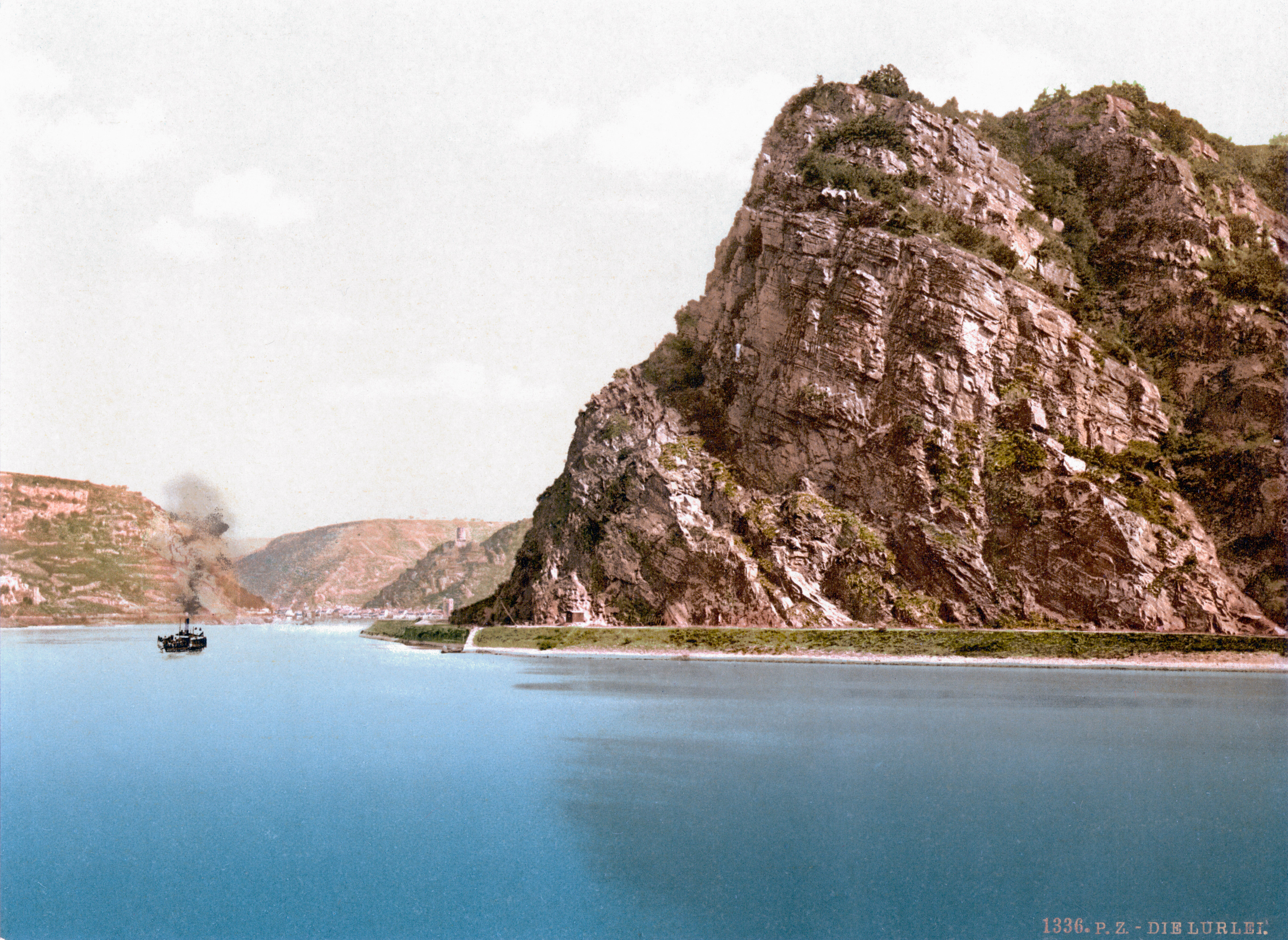
the Lorelei, Germany, ca. 1900

The first steamboats arrived on the Rhine from England in 1816. The Dutch were first to react. In 1824 they founded the Nederlandsche Stoomboot Maatschappij (NSM). After establishing a few local lines from Rotterdam, NSM established a line from Rotterdam to Cologne in 1825.

The founders of NSM negotiated with merchants from Cologne, who participated in NSM. In 1827 the Preussisch-Rheinischen Dampfschiffahrtsgesellschaft (PRDG), then started to operate a steamboat service between Cologne and Mainz. This line cooperated with NSM. Further up the Rhine Dampfschiffahrtsgesellschaft von Rhein und Main (DGRM) operated between Mainz and Strasbourg.

In 1838 the Dampfschiffahrts-Gesellschaft für den Nieder- und Mittelrhein (DGNM), the "Düsseldorf" company was founded. It led to a time of intense competition. At about the same time, the growth of freight and passenger traffic was limited by the expansion of the railways which were constructed along the banks of the Rhine.

The river became heavily travelled during the Industrial Revolution, by 1856 the millionth ticket was proudly sold. In 1832, the first steamboat journeyed from the North Sea all the way to Basel, but this was not a regular service. Mannheim was an established port by 1840, and In 1846 the Ludwig-Donau-Canal was completed after 9 years of work. It was named after King Ludwig I of Bavaria. The steamboats also started a new age of tourism in Germany.

In January 1925 PRDG and DGNM founded the Köln-Düsseldorfer Rheinschiffahrts GmbH. This new company became the manager of the two companies. It was also a legal entity which became the owner of some of the assets. Henceforward logistics where managed from Cologne, while the Düsseldorf office was responsible for commerce. In April 1928 the Dutch Nederlandsche Stoomboot Reederij (NSR), which had succeeded to NSM's shipping activities on the Rhine, was entered into the partnership. The NSR had 10 ships, and took 4 from the partners. It also became responsible for the entire freight activities of the Köln-Düsseldorfer. This made 1928 a record year with 2.649 million passengers.

Today KD operates a vast selection of river cruises on the Rhine, Moselle and Main. In Dusseldorf, Cologne, Cochem and Frankfurt the company offers 1-hour-sightseeing cruises in addition to its regular services between Cologne and Linz and between Koblenz and Mainz respectively. KD is also well known for its party and evening cruises which take place all year long.

== Fleet ==
KD operates a fleet of 15 vessels in total. The oldest of which is the RMS Goethe that was built in 1913.

- MS RheinGalaxie (2022) - MS RheinMagie (2004) - MS RheinFantasie (2011) - MS RheinVision (1996) - MS RheinHarmonie (1992) - MS RheinDiamond - MS RheinPoesie (1994) - MS Asbach (1996) - MS Godesburg (1994) - RMS Goethe (1913) - MS Boppard (1996) - MS Palladium (2006) - MS Willi Ostermann (1965) - MS Moselprinz (1980) - MS Rheinkrone (1991)

The MS Stolzenzfels (1979), officially still part of the fleet, isn't in passenger service anymore since 2023 and is currently docked in the port of Cologne Niehl.
