= Lorelei =

Rock formation in Germany

- Slate rock
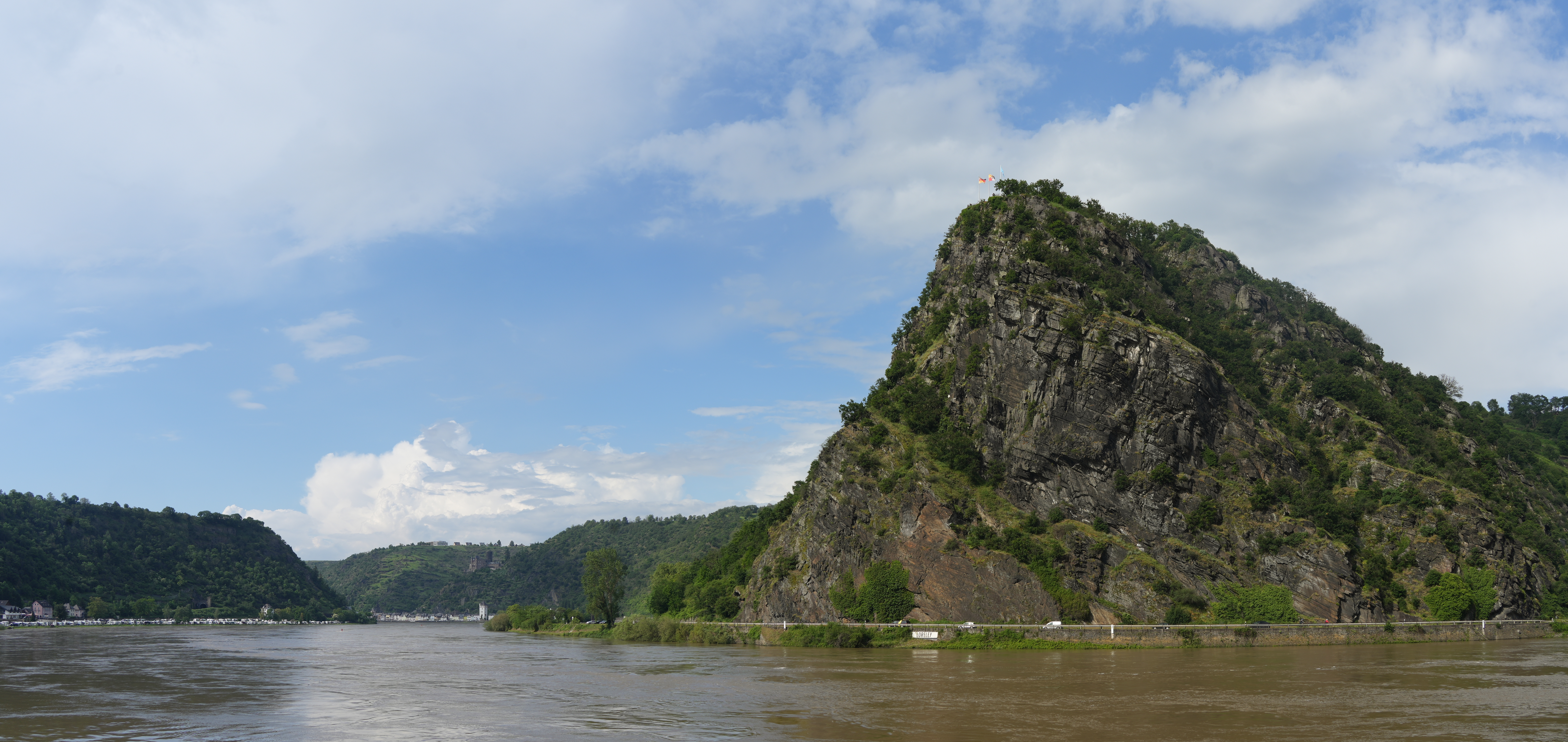
- View from the left bank of the Rhine at Sankt Goar
- Coordinates: 50°08′22″N 7°43′44″E

The Lorelei (/ˈlɒrəlaɪ/ LORR-ə-ly; German: Loreley or Lorelei, pronounced [loːʁəˈlaɪ̯] or [ˈloːʁəlaɪ̯]; also found as Loreleï, Lore Lay, Lore-Ley, Lurley, Lurelei and Lurlei throughout history) is a 132-metre-high (433 ft), steep slate rock on the right bank of the River Rhine in the Rhine Gorge (or Middle Rhine) at Sankt Goarshausen in Germany, part of the Upper Middle Rhine Valley UNESCO World Heritage Site. The 1930s Loreley Amphitheatre is on top of the rock.

It has been an infamous fluvial disaster site since its first records during the 10th century, with a varied mythos, ranging from dwarfs to a siren trying to explain the high number of shipwrecks and the loud echo inside the passage.

== Etymology ==
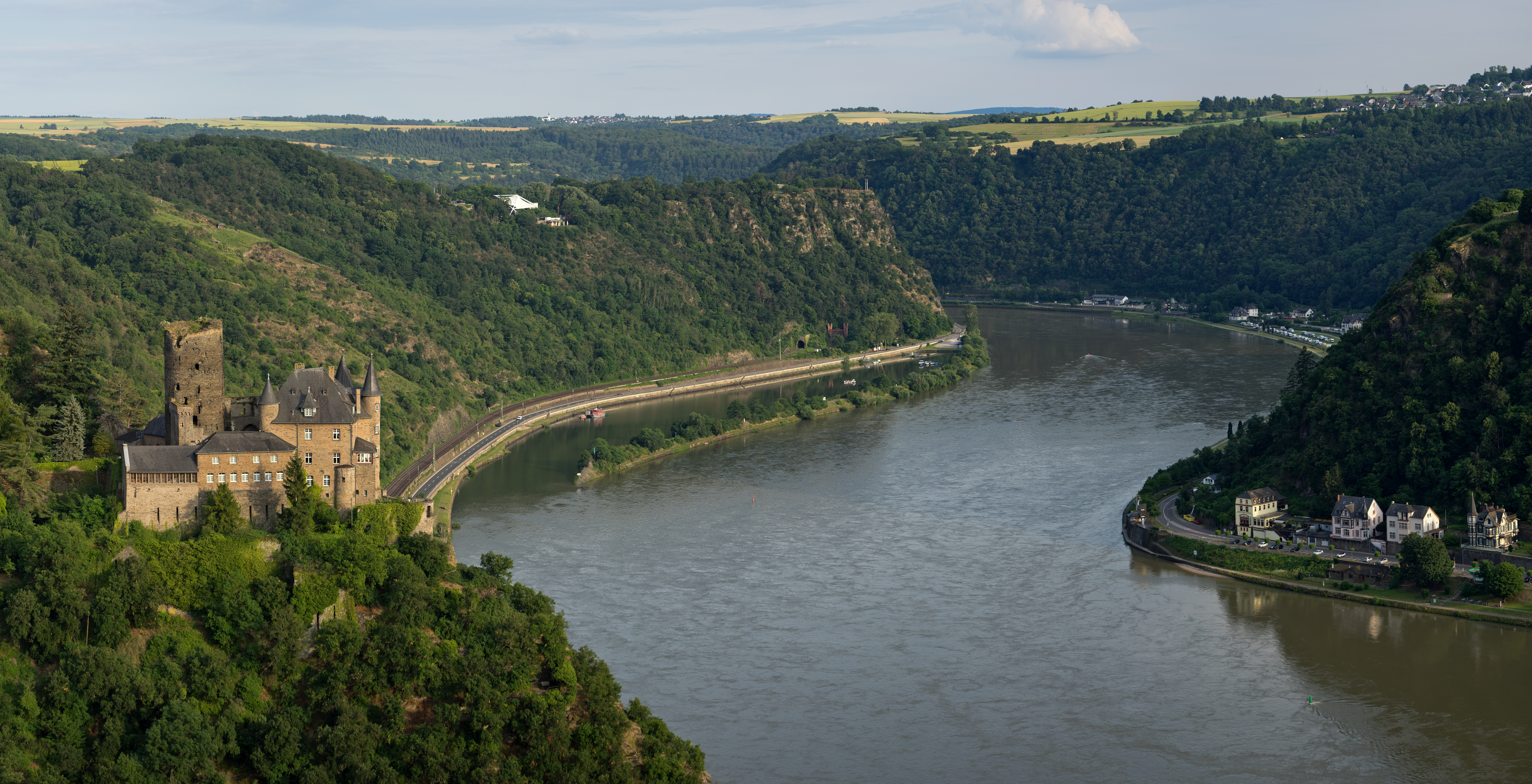
Aerial image of Katz Castle and the Lorelei

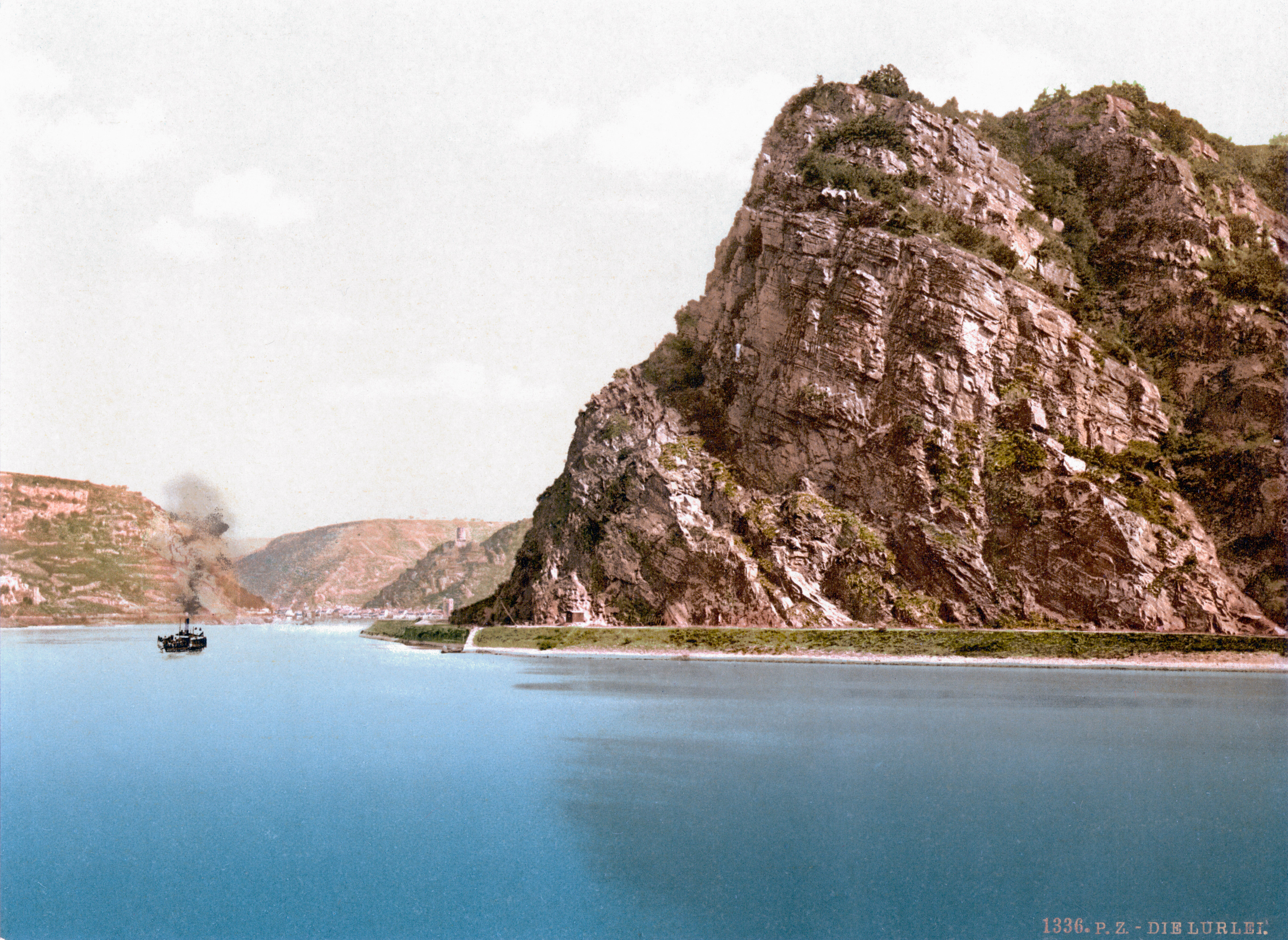
Lorelei in 1900

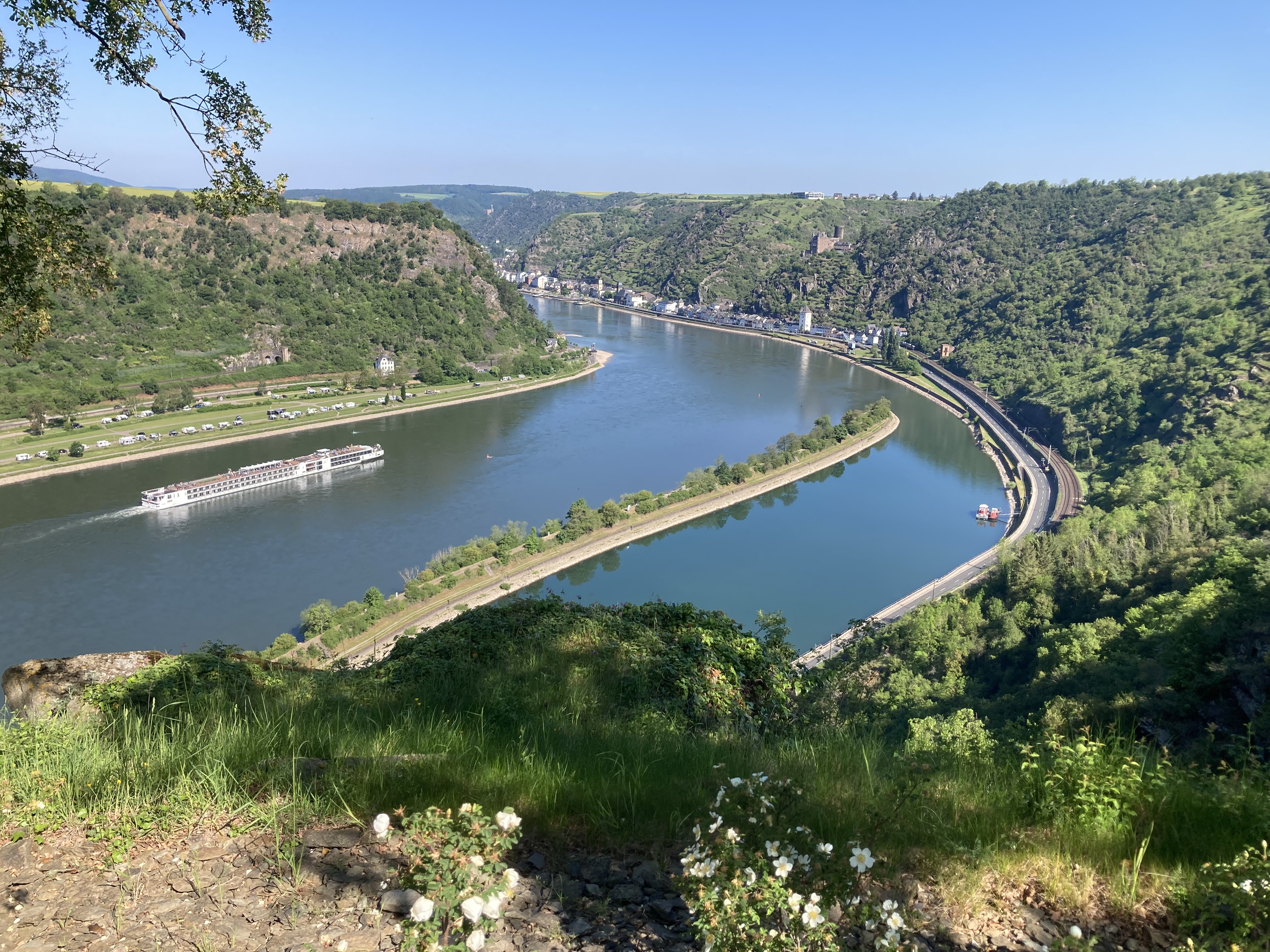
View of the Rhine as seen from the Lorelei

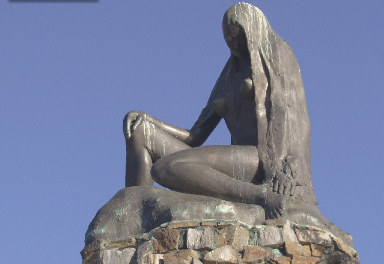
Lorelei, siren of Germanic mythology, of great beauty and delicious song, who was placed on a rock on the Rhine and with her song seduced the navigators. Sculpture that stands on the banks of the river in the Rhineland.

The name comes from the old German words lureln, Rhine dialect for "murmuring", and the Old German term ley "rock". The translation of the name would therefore be "murmur rock" or "murmuring rock". The heavy currents, and a small waterfall in the area (still visible in the early 19th century) created a murmuring sound, and this combined with the special echo the rock produces to act as a sort of amplifier, giving the rock its name. The murmuring is hard to hear today owing to the urbanization of the area. Other theories attribute the name to the many boating accidents on the rock, by combining the German verb lauern ('to lurk, lie in wait') with the same "ley" ending, with the translation "lurking rock".

After the German spelling reform of 1901, in almost all German terms, the letter "y" was changed to the letter "i".

== Original folklore and modern myth ==
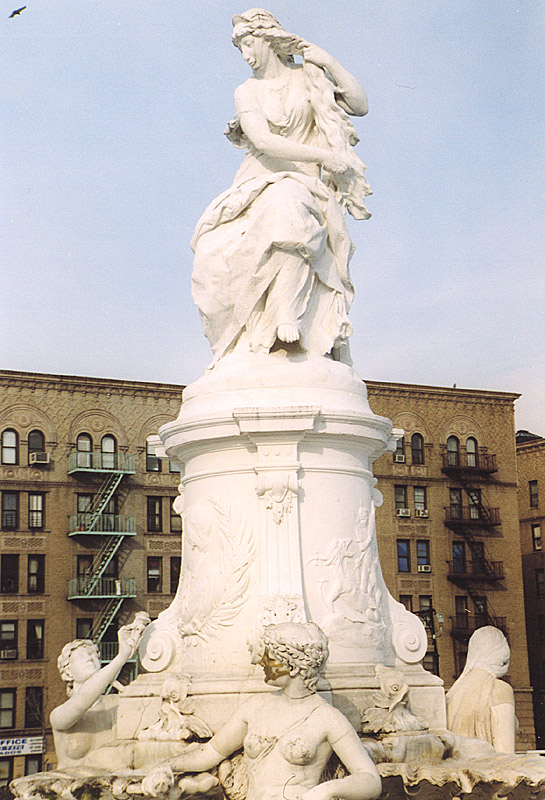
Lorelei Fountain by Ernst Herter, a Heinrich Heine memorial in the Bronx, New York City

The rock and the murmur it creates have inspired various tales. An old legend envisioned dwarfs living in caves in the rock.

In 1801, German author Clemens Brentano composed his ballad Zu Bacharach am Rheine as part of a fragmentary continuation of his novel Godwi oder Das steinerne Bild der Mutter. It first told the story of an enchanting woman associated with the rock. In the poem, the beautiful Lore Lay, betrayed by her sweetheart, is accused of bewitching men and causing their death. Instead of sentencing her to death, the bishop consigns her to a nunnery. On the way thereto, accompanied by three knights, she comes to the Lorelei rock. She asks permission to climb it and view the Rhine once again. She does so, and, thinking that she sees her love in the Rhine, falls to her death; the rock ever afterward retaining an echo of her name. Brentano had taken inspiration from Ovid and the Echo myth.

In 1824, Heinrich Heine seized on and adapted Brentano's theme in one of his most famous poems, "Die Lorelei". It describes the eponymous female as a sort of siren who, sitting on the cliff above the Rhine and combing her golden hair, unwittingly distracted shipmen with her beauty and song, causing them to crash on the rocks. In 1837 Heine's lyrics were set to music by Friedrich Silcher in the art song "Lorelei" that became well known in German-speaking lands. A setting by Franz Liszt was also favored and dozens of other musicians have set the poem to music. During the Nazi regime and World War II, Heinrich Heine (born as a Jew) became discredited as author of the lyrics, in an effort to dismiss and hide Jewish contribution to German art. Loreley also appears in the poem "Waldesgespräch" which appears as a dialog in Joseph von Eichendorff's first novel, Ahnung und Gegenwart (1812); that poem was set by Robert Schumann in his Liederkreis, Op. 39.

The Lorelei character, although originally imagined by Brentano, passed into German popular culture in the form described in the Heine–Silcher song and is commonly but mistakenly believed to have originated in an old folk tale. The French writer Guillaume Apollinaire took up the theme again in his poem "La Loreley", from the collection Alcools which is later cited in Symphony No. 14 (3rd movement) of Dmitri Shostakovich. The character continues to be referenced in pop culture, such as the 1969 Townes Van Zandt title track for "Our Mother The Mountain," Roxy Music's 1973 "Editions of You", The Pogues's 1989 song "Lorelei", the 1998 Eagle-Eye Cherry single "When Mermaids Cry", David Gray's 2002 song "Lorelei" on the Japanese release of A New Day at Midnight. The 2004 Blackmore's Night album Ghost of a Rose includes a song "Loreley". In 2015 Fischer-Z released the song "Lorelei" on their album "This Is My Universe". The Australian band Ne Obliviscaris published the album Urn in 2017, in which the song Eyrie relays tragedy and lamentation surrounding her death.

== Accidents ==
A barge carrying 2,400 tons of sulphuric acid capsized on 13 January 2011, near the Lorelei rock, blocking traffic on one of Europe's busiest waterways.

== Gallery ==
Lorelei rock in the Rhine Gorge

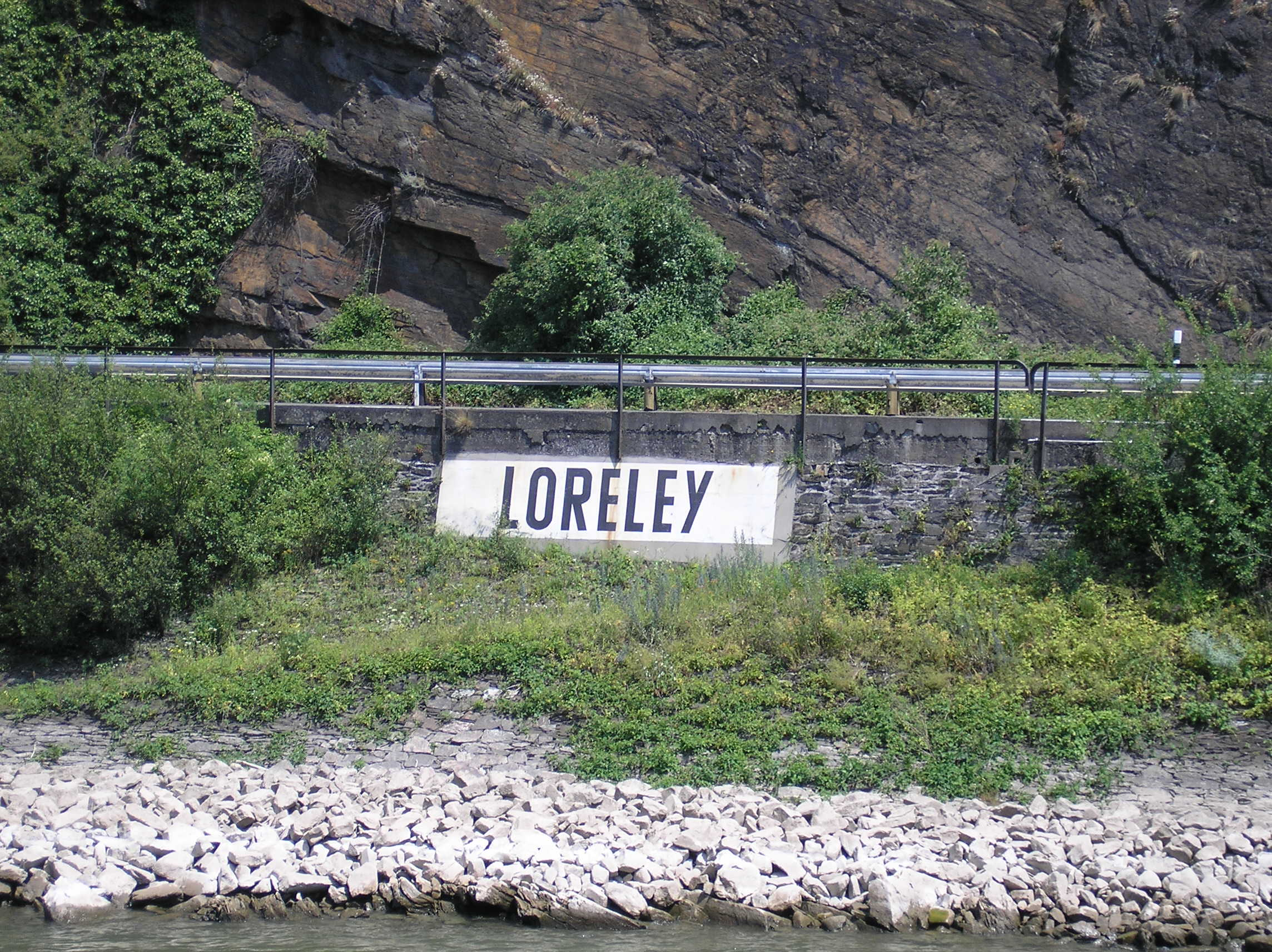
Sign on the bank of the Rhine

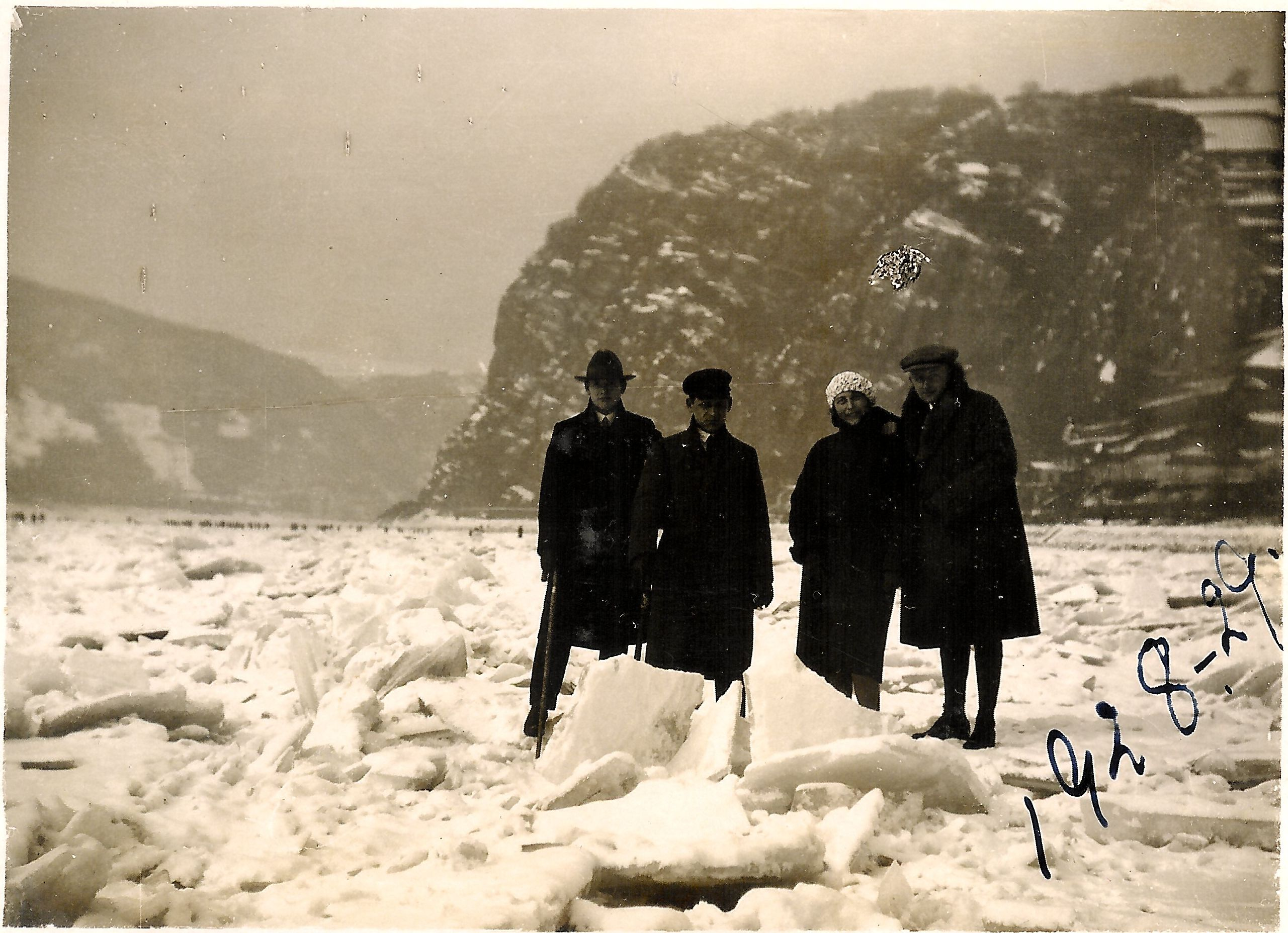
Ice at the Lorelei in the winter of 1928/29

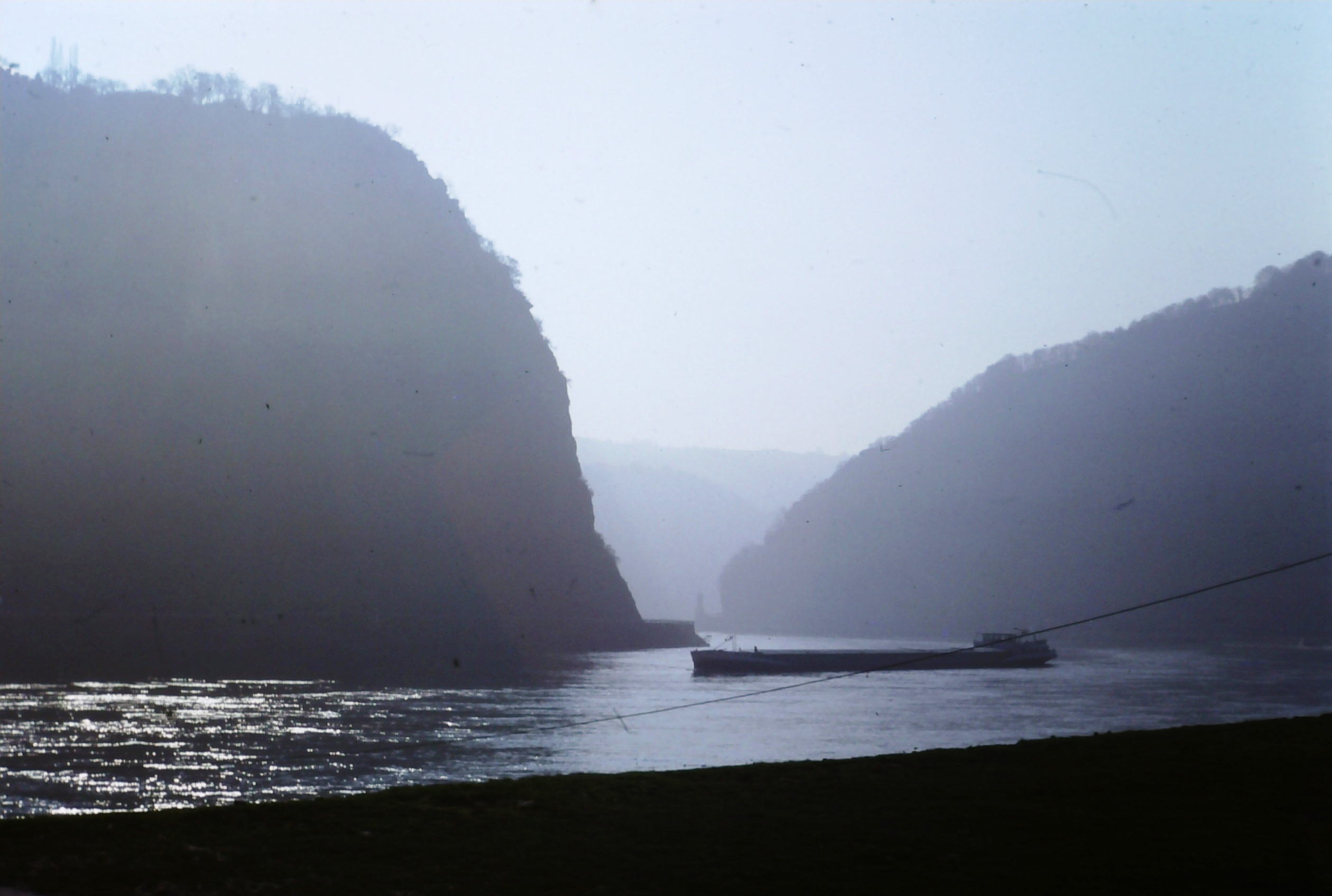
Lorelei in fog

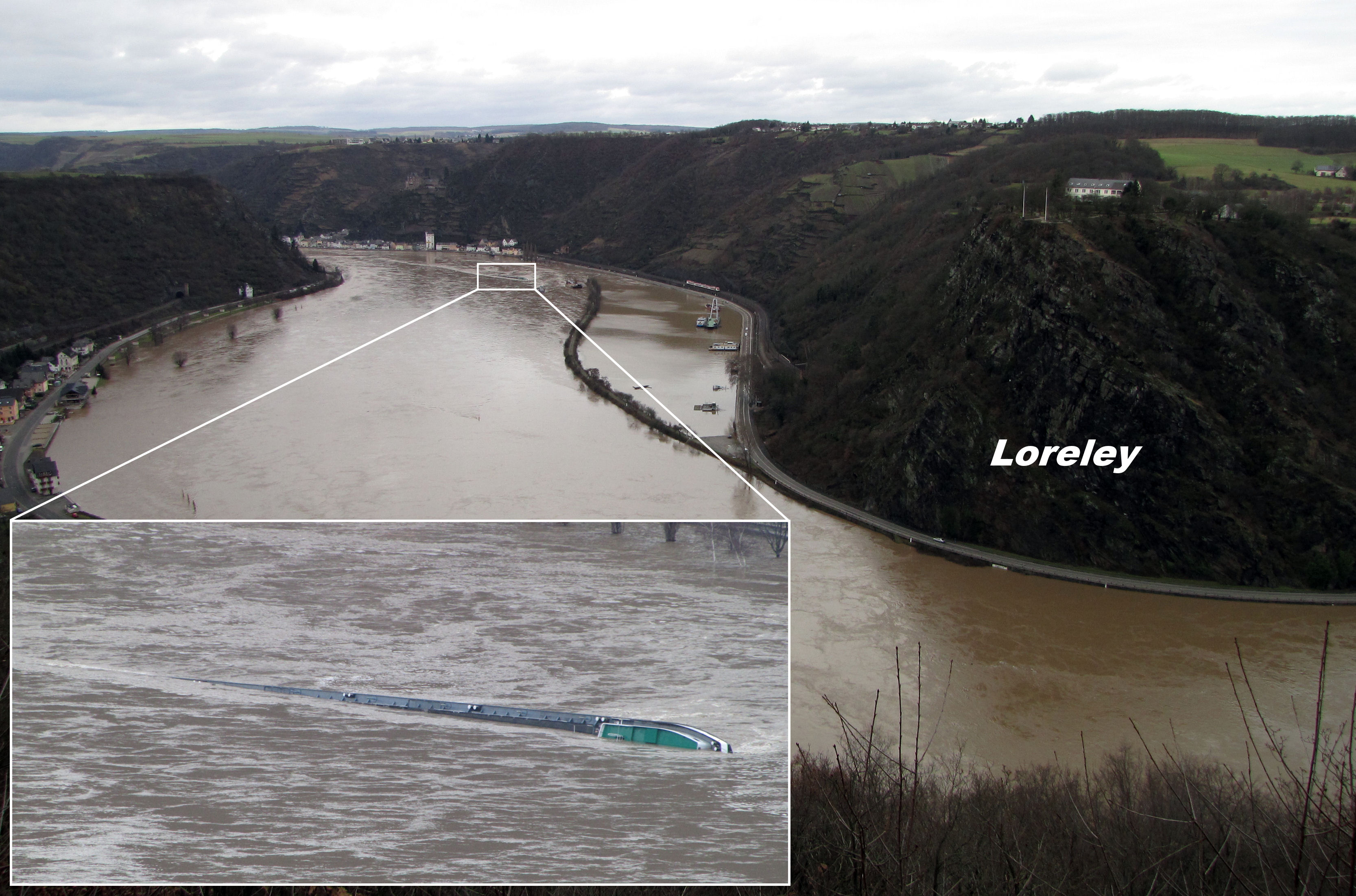
Ship accident near the Lorelei, January 2011

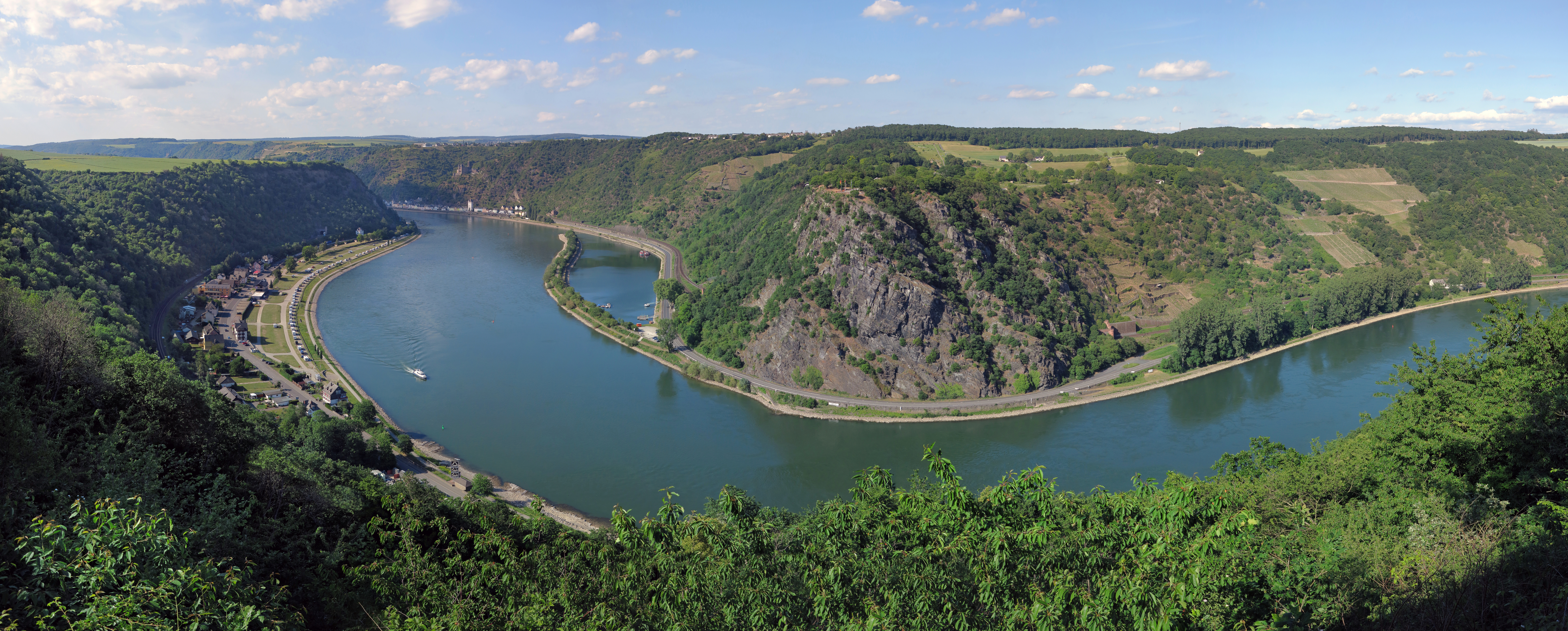
Lorelei seen from the viewpoint Maria Ruh, Urbar

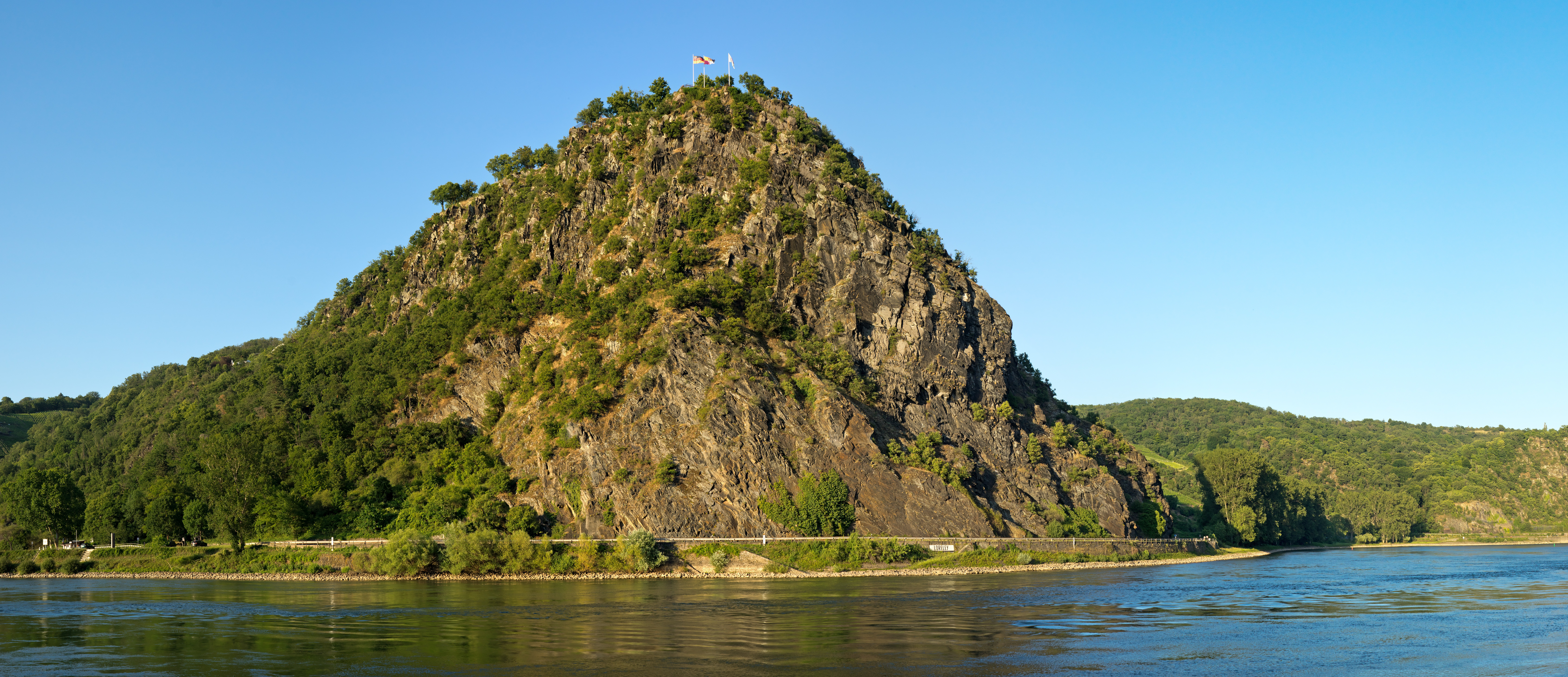
Lorelei viewed from the river

== See also ==
- Siren in Greek mythology
- Sirin, Russian mythological creature
