= Stadt Frankfurt (1827) =

Steamboat

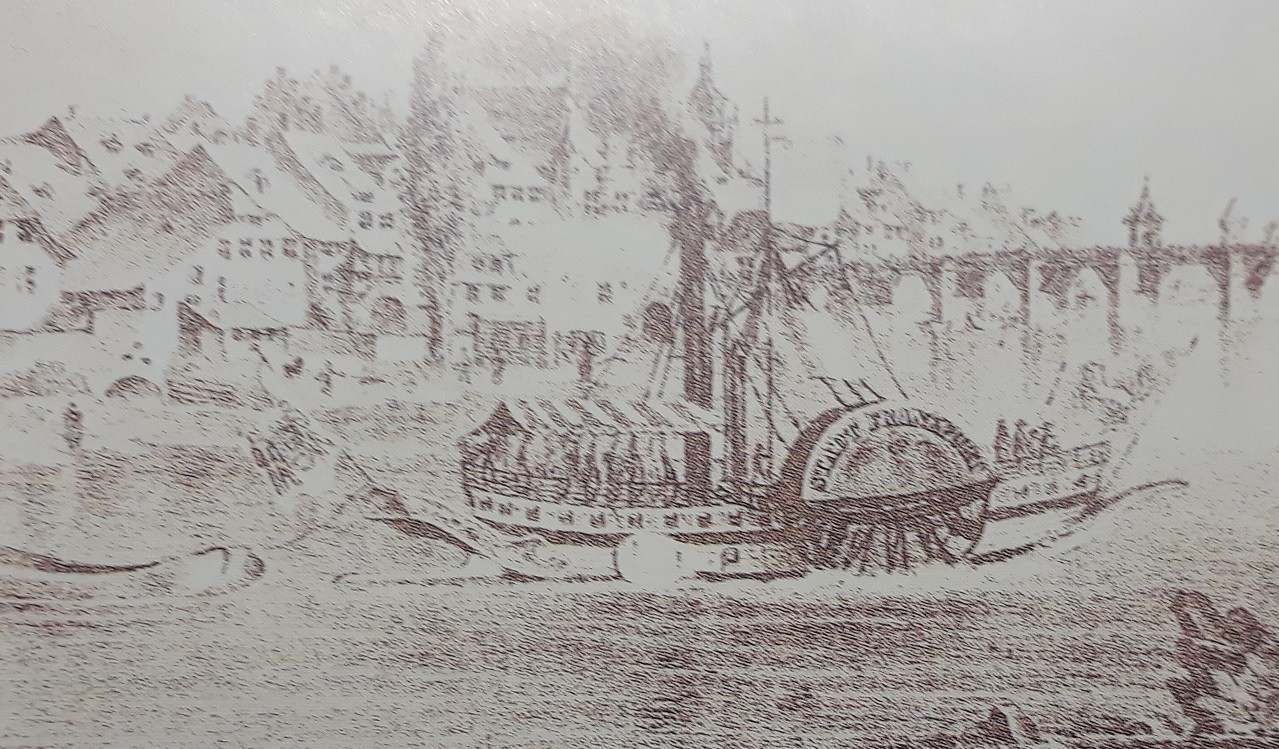
- Stadt Frankfurt in Basel on 28 July 1832

History
- Name: Stadt Frankfurt
- Namesake: Frankfurt
- Owner: Dampfschiffahrts-Gesellschaft von Rhein und Main
- Builder: NSM's shipyard in IJsselmonde
- Cost: 102,000 guilders
- Launched: August 1827
- Commissioned: 8 March 1828

History
- Name: Stadt Frankfurt
- Owner: Preußisch-Rheinische Dampfschiffahrts-Gesellschaft
- Acquired: 1832
- Fate: Broken up 1840

General characteristics
- Type: Paddle steamboat
- Length: 28.5 m
- Beam: 5.7 m
- Draught: 0.48 m
- Installed power: 30 hp (22 kW)
- Propulsion: 2 paddle wheels
- Complement: 10

Stadt Frankfurt was the first steamboat on the Main and the first steamboat to steam up the Oberrhein to Basel, Switzerland in 1832.

== Context ==
In 1825, a company was founded in Baden to introduce regular service with steamboats on the Upper Rhine. In October 1825, it ordered three steamboats at the Nederlandsche Stoomboot Maatschappij (NSM). In 1826, the company fused with a company from Frankfurt, Mainz and Strasbourg to form the Dampfschiffahrts-Gesellschaft von Rhein und Main (DGRM) with headquarters in Mainz. Its plan was to introduce a regular service on the Rhine between Mainz and Strasbourg, and on the Main between Mainz and Frankfurt.

Concordia was delivered first, but when she showed to be unsuitable for the projected service between Mainz and Mannheim, she was sold to the Preußisch-Rheinische Dampfschiffahrts-Gesellschaft (PRDG), which successfully used her between Cologne and Mainz. The next ship that was delivered was Ludwig, which had been planned for service between Mainz and Strasbourg. Stadt Frankfurt was the third ship ordered by DGRM. She was planned for use on the Main between Main and Frankfurt, and had been specially constructed to have a very shallow draft.

== Boat characteristics ==
The order for Stadt Frankfurt went to the Nederlandsche Stoomboot Maatschappij. This had to do with NSM's steamboat De Rijn being the first to reach Strasbourg and Kehl in September 1825. As NSM had proven its capabilities, it got the order for the three DGRM boats. The order included the boat for the shallow Main. Up until then, NSM had subcontracted others to build the hull of her steam vessels. E.g. Hogendijk in Cappelle aan de IJssel and somewhat later a shipyard in Alblasserdam. In November 1824 NSM established its own smithy. In May 1825 it then bought the shipyard of H. Blanken in Oost IJsselmonde. Here NSM erected a shear leg, crucial for lifting boilers.

The hull of Stadt Frankfurt would be built on the NSM shipyard in Oost IJsselmonde. During construction, the biggest challenge was to limit the draft of the boat, while making her strong enough to carry the machinery. During the construction of Willem de Eerste Fop Smit first applied a good solution for this problem. It used iron bars that crossed and supported each other. NSM's shipyard Fijenoord would become an expert in this field after many costly experiments.

The hull was described as being 100 by 32 feet with a draft of 16-17 Inch. This was much more than the size of the biggest barge on the Main up until then, the large Mainz Market boat (Mainzer Marktschiff) of 80 by 24 feet. The Frankfurt feet was 0.2846 m, and so the metric length measurement of 28.5 m becomes obvious. The beam of 32 feet translates to 9.10 m which would then be the beam including the paddlewheels. The draft of 16-17 inches translates to 0.4 m, which might then be the empty draft.

Delivery of Stadt Frankfurt had been planned for June 1827. The draft problem would cause many delays. Stadt Frankfurt was measured at 130 ton, which was quite small.

The engines of Stadt Frankfurt were ordered at John Seaward & Co., which had also made those for the successful Concordia and Friedrich Wilhelm. The engine produced only 30 hp. This gave the boat a small power to weight ratio.

In 1834 the Gutehoffnungshütte Shipyard in Ruhrort added two low-pressure cylinders to Stadt Frankfurt's two high-pressure cylinders. This made the engine of Stadt Frankfurt a double compound steam engine. The new cylinders were measured at 28 hp, probably giving Stadt Frankfurt a total of about 60 hp. The engines now made 30 turns a minute at 50 pounds steam pressure, instead of only 24. The different number of strokes that the cylinders made had to be handled by cogwheels, which somewhat limited the effectiveness due to friction losses.

== Service for DGRM ==
=== Service on the Main ===
Stadt Frankfurt was finally launched in August 1827. In February 1828 a representative of the DGRM left for Rotterdam to collect the Stadt Frankfurt. In Kaub some board members of the DGRM got on board to see how she would handle the strong currents between Kaub and Bingen. Due to her flat bottom, it was expected that she would also be able to steam through the Binger Loch, which had never been before. With 35 pounds of steam pressure, and 30 rotations a minute, this attempt succeeded. This seemed promising, because this was only two-thirds of her maximum power. In the evening of 5 March 1828 Stadt Frankfurt arrived in Mainz, where she would run some trials. On 8 March 1828 at 6 pm Stadt Frankfurt finally arrived in Frankfurt for the first time.

Even before delivery, there were people doubting the suitability of Stadt Frankfurt. These doubts centered on the draft, which would be too high for the Main, and on the engine power, which was thought to be too small. When she finally started service on the Main, the boilers and engines were damaged after only a few days. By the end of June, Stadt Frankfurt was lying idle in the harbor of Frankfurt, after several attempts to fix her boiler and the engine had failed.

Already in late June 1828 DGRM was reported to have given up on Stadt Frankfurt. Stadt Frankfurt served only a few days on the Main in 1828. Meanwhile PRDG had a problem on the route from Köln to Mainz, where the water level was extremely low. From 29 October to 3 November 1828 Stadt Frankfurt was used to transport passengers on the section from Bautsberg (opposite Assmannshausen) to Mainz, and till 10 November she steamed from Kaub to Mainz. At the end of the year Stadt Frankfurt was sent to Ruhrort, to be fixed by the shipyard of Jacobi, Haniel & Huyssen.

During the winter of 1828-1829 Stadt Frankfurt was repaired. She was then expected to be able to make the trip from Mainz to Frankfurt in 4.5 hours, and the return trip in 2.5 hours. From 22 April 1829 Stadt Frankfurt indeed served on the Main again. The results were disappointing, because on windless days she still required at least 6.5 hours to steam to Frankfurt. The season was again ended by engine trouble.

After a long repair of and changes to the engines of Stadt Frankfurt, she left Ruhrort for Mainz on 9 May 1830. On 22 May 1830 she made a trial trip to Frankfurt and back, with only a few passengers. On 27 May 1830 she resumed service to Frankfurt. Her schedule included a stop at Höchst, and had different prices for the cabin and the pavilion. It had the peculiarity that it was cheaper upstream. This was because of the competition of the stagecoach. The shipyard in Ruhrort had indeed fixed Stadt Frankfurt.

=== Commercial failure on the Main ===
The city of Frankfurt had provided facilities to promote steam propulsion on the Rhine. DGRM got a concession for 6 years, which would prevent competition. She also got a license for the daily Mainzer Marktschiff. On the other hand, the cost of Stadt Frankfurt had been very high.

In the end, the use of Stadt Frankfurt on the Main would prove a commercial failure. She was primarily built for passengers, but on the small stretch from Frankfurt to Mainz she was not much faster than the stagecoach. This led many travelers to go to Mainz by stagecoach and to board a Rhine steamboat over there. Meanwhile freight transport on the Main remained behind. In 1828 601 hundredweight of cargo was transported, in 1829 7491 hundredweight. This was about four times less than what the boats on the Middle Rhine transported, and these also transported much more passengers.

=== Service on the Upper Rhine ===
In May 1830 the Ludwig, which had supposedly been fixed by Cockerill, had also arrived back on the Rhine. Ludwig was meant for service south of Mainz, but soon proved unusable. Later in 1830 DGRM then employed Stadt Frankfurt on the Oberrhein stretch between Mainz and Schröck near Karlsruhe. While this might have been successful, it could not prevent the end of the DGRM, which had lost a lot of money, and saw no more chances to become profitable.

== Service for PRDG ==
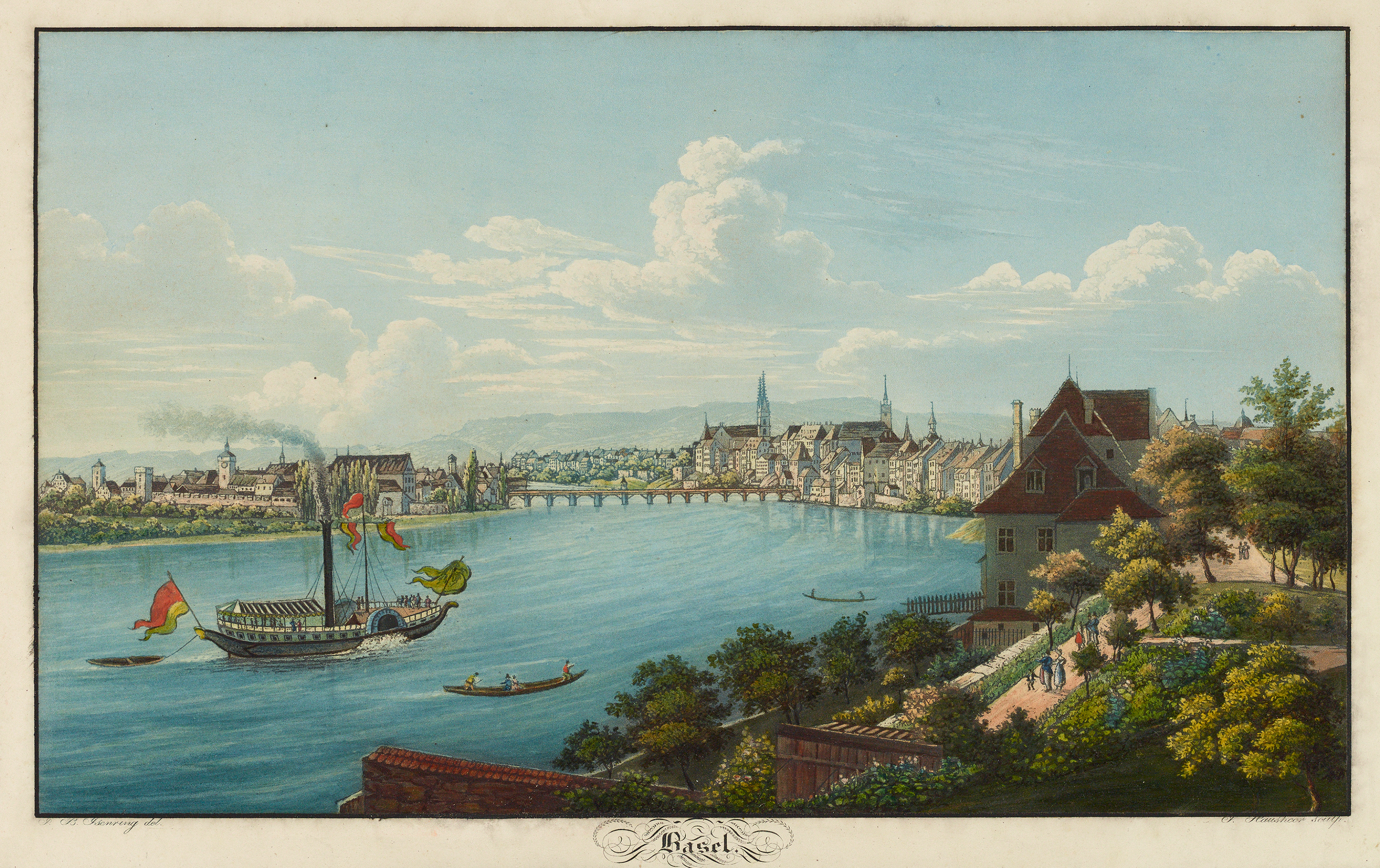
Stadt Frankfurt reaches Basel on 28 July 1832

In January 1832, the Preußisch-Rheinische Dampfschiffahrts-Gesellschaft (PRDG) acquired all the assets of DGRM in exchange for 120.000 Thaler in shares. The assets included a workshop and the steamboats Ludwig and Stadt Frankfurt. Ludwig was sold as unusable, but Stadt Frankfurt was indispensable for sections with strong currents. She nevertheless required new boilers soon after.

In early 1832 Stadt Frankfurt was again in regular use between Kaub and Mainz due to low water levels. This of course prevented her planned use on the Oberrhein. In June 1832 the water level between Kaub and Mainz became more normal, and Stadt Frankfurt again became available for the Upper Rhine. From September 1832 low water levels again made that Stadt Frankfurt served on the Middle Rhiine. She first between Kaub and Mainz, and then between the Lorelei and Mainz. During this service there were complaints about her low speed and lack of power. Meanwhile Prinzess Marianne was used on the Upper Rhine.

In the Summer of 1832 PRDG used Stadt Frankfurt for an expedition investigate whether steamboats could reach Basel. Gerhard Moritz Roentgen, director of NSM was chosen to lead the expedition. He arrived in Mainz in mid-June. Up to Kehl the members of the Central Commission for Navigation on the Rhine were on board. On 28 July 1832 Stadt Frankfurt was the first steamboat to reach Basel. On 7 August she was back in Kehl.

In 1833 Stadt Frankfurt was used in a service from Kehl (opposite Strasbourg) to Eggenstein-Leopoldshafen. From Leopoldshafen there was a regular service to Mainz. PRDG saw this is a temporary expedient, and planned to use her elsewhere once proper ships had been built for this service. According to schedule, Stadt Frankfurt would leave Kehl at 4 in the morning, so that passengers arrived in time in Leopoldshafen to transfer to the boat that left from there to Mainz at 10 am. The majority of passengers on this service came from Switzerland and France, not from Strasbourg itself.

After she got a new low-pressure engine in the winter (see above), Stadt Frankfurt was to serve again between Kehl and Leopoldshafen starting on 10 August 1834. Before that, the up-engined boat made an attempt to steam up the river Ill, a tributary on which Strasbourg is situated. This failed due to a lack of depth and width of the Ill. She then made an attempt to steam up another tributary, the Little Rhine. This succeeded in as far as she was able to reach the Citadel of Strasbourg. According to plan she then went from Kehl to Ludwigshafen on 10 August. Later in the season low water levels made that Stadt Frankfurt again served between Kaub and Mainz, and later between Sankt Goar and Mainz, transporting only passengers.

In 1835 Stadt Frankfurt was again planned to serve between Leopoldshafen and Strasbourg. This was also the case in 1836. In 1837 she also appeared on the Upper Rhine. In 1838 she was also busy on the stretch to Strasbourg, where Prinz Wilhelm joined her in May.

In her final years, Stadt Frankfurt served on the middle Rhine between Cologne and Emmerich am Rhein. In June 1840 Stadt Frankfurt was employed on a local line between Mainz and Bingen. On 18 August a barge was sunk near Geisenheim by Stadt Mainz while she passed Stadt Frankfurt.

1840 Stadt Frankfurt was broken up. In 1843 the PRDG commissioned a new Stadt Frankfurt.
