= Agrippina (1827) =

19th c. steamboat

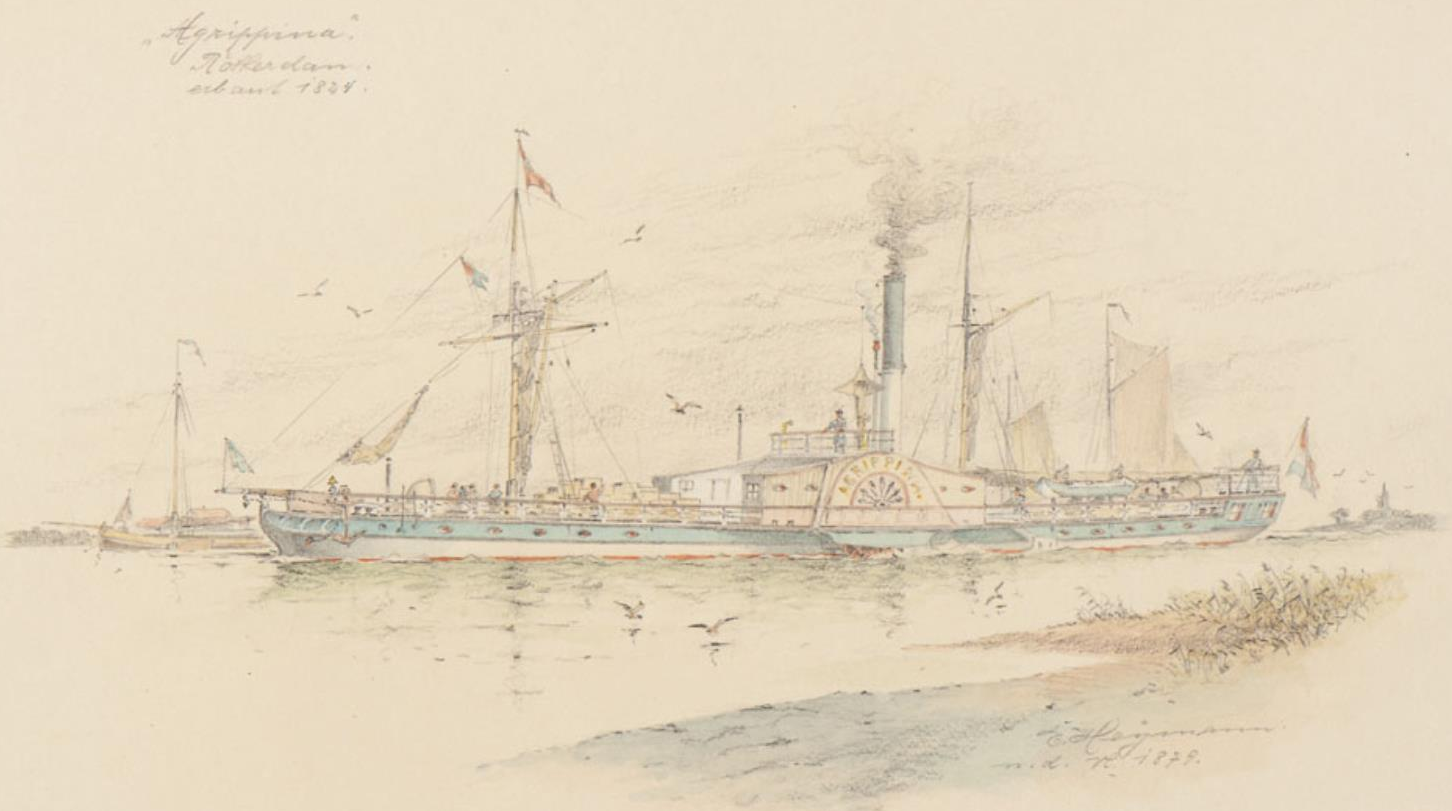
- Agrippina by C.E. Heymann

History
- Name: Agrippina
- Namesake: Agrippina the Younger
- Builder: ? Smit Ablasserdam, directed by Nederlandsche Stoomboot Maatschappij, Rotterdam
- Launched: March 1827
- Acquired: refused delivery
- Name: Agrippina
- Launched: 1834 (relaunch after lengthening)
- Acquired: October 1828

General characteristics
- Type: Paddle steamboat
- Length: 142 ft 0 in (43.3 m) (original); 200 ft 0 in (61.0 m) (lengthened)
- Beam: 42 ft 0 in (12.8 m) (original)
- Draught: 4 ft 2 in (1.3 m) (original)
- Installed power: 80 hp (60 kW) (original); 120 hp (89 kW)
- Propulsion: 2 paddle wheels

Agrippina was a steamboat designed for the Middle Rhine. On delivery she was found to be too heavy, and was returned to her builder NSM, which tried to use her as a freighter on the Lower Rhine. When this failed too, Agrippina's engines were used to create the compound steam engine of the tugboat Hercules, creating the first effective compound steam engines. In 1829 Agrippina was the first towed dumb barge on the Rhine. After a rebuilt, she became the first steamboat to tow an iron barge on the Rhine in 1841.

== Context ==
=== Preußisch-Rheinische Dampfschiffahrts-Gesellschaft (PRDG) ===
In October 1825 the Preußisch-Rheinische Dampfschiffahrts-Gesellschaft (PRDG) ordered two steamboats at the Nederlandsche Stoomboot Maatschappij (Dutch Steamboat Comp.) A later overview suggests that Agrippina was part of this initial order by the PRDG. It also showed that she was comparatively large for a steamboat. Already in 1828, PRDG's plan was to use Agrippina as the third boat between Cologne and Mainz. This would allow the company to make 240 trips a year instead of only 160.

=== Construction ===
Agrippina was built in Alblasserdam, so the hull was probably built by one of the Smit shipyards. The hull measured 142 by 25 feet. Including the paddle wheels, beam was 42 feet. Other measurements are 146 by 38 feet. It is not sure which feet were meant. The hull was launched in March 1827.

The engines for Agrippina were ordered at Taylor & Martineau in London. These were to be more powerful than those of her predecessors, so Agrippina would more easily get upstream. This would be achieved by using high steam pressure, which renders much more effective horse-power than the low pressure steam engines of the ships that PRDG already had. Taylor & Martineau was known for high pressure steam engines, as well as for horizontal steam engines.

The innovative engines of Agrippina proved much heavier than expected, and so her draft increased from 2.5 feet to 3.5 feet. After loading coal her draft was even 4'2". Meanwhile, the partnership Taylor & Martineau was dissolved in 1827.

== First service ==
=== PRDG refuses delivery of Agrippina ===
In late May 1828, Agrippina first arrived in Cologne. The PRDG was quick to point out defects, and so Agrippina returned to Rotterdam in order to be made more suitable for the Rhine. On 27 June 1828, Agrippina arrived in Mainz, where she was tested again. When PRDG observed that Agrippina had more draft than expected, the company refused to accept her, and a commission of experts was formed to investigate. In late August, she was still in the harbor, because PRDG did not dare to use her in the service between Cologne and Mainz after a second test had led to negative results.

As built, Agrippina showed more problems than only high draft. The machinery took up so much place, that the boat could not carry carriages. It also used an extraordinary amount of coal, about 300 hundredweight a day. Furthermore, Agrippina was 13 hours slower than Concordia on the stretch from Cologne to Mainz. It would mean that on the two steaming days of this stretch, Agrippina would have to leave six hours earlier on each day.

The problem for PRDG was that the contract had been made without proper technical specifications. In the end a deal was made whereby PRDG would trade in Agrippina for NSM's De Rijn and pay the high price of 165,000 guilders. By 31 October, Agrippina had been accepted back by the NSM, and had left Cologne for Rotterdam. The details of the deal, including the delivery of her replacement on 1 April, were published on 21 February 1829.

=== Service with NSM ===
After being returned to NSM, Agrippina was used to tow barges between Rotterdam and Wesel or Ruhrort. Now the defects were confirmed. Her very heavy engines did not function well under average pressure. The boat was very slow, and she consumed an extraordinary amount of coal. NSM then decided to radically change Agrippina.

=== The dumb barge Agrippina and the invention of the compound steam engine ===
The failure of Agrippina financially affected NSM. In the deal with PRDG it had lost a steamboat. NSM then discovered that she had no commercially viable use for Agrippina. Meanwhile, Roentgen undoubtedly knew of the ban on the use of high-pressure steam engines on passenger ships, which the Dutch government would issue in 1829.

By late 1828 NSM was in financial trouble, even defaulting on loan repayments. The idea of lending even more money, so Agrippina could get a new low-pressure engine was probably not realistic. What could be done was to use the high-pressure engines of Agrippina in a tugboat. NSM had a big tugboat lying around somewhere, the unfinished Hercules. In January 1829, or even earlier, Roentgen got the idea to place the high-pressure cylinders of Agrippina in Hercules. The idea was that Hercules would then tow Agrippina, which had good passenger accommodation. This way, NSM could make money without big new investments.

The re-use of Agrippina's high-pressure cylinders in combination with a low-pressure cylinder led to the first effective compound steam engine. When Hercules was first put into service, she could only use her high pressure cylinders. On 17 August 1829 Hercules left Rotterdam for Düsseldorf towing Agrippina, which had been turned into a dumb barge with luxury passenger accommodation. On 20 August the combination reached Düsseldorf where grand duchess Helen of Russia disembarked.

The service of Hercules and Agrippina was regularly scheduled for September 1829. However, the size of both vessels made the combination troublesome. Hercules was then changed for a different mode of transport, and Agrippina had failed again.

== Service after rebuild ==
=== Plans to reactivate Agrippina ===
After failing as a dumb barge, Agrippina probably spent most of her time laying around at Fijenoord shipyard. In 1832, there was a plan to borrow 40,000 guilders to create new engines for her, but the loan failed. In June 1833, a new plan to borrow for new engines succeeded. From this information, we have to assume that the new Agrippina which appeared later on, was a rebuild of the old one. This is not certain but is supported by the lifespan of the ship.

The new engines of Agrippina were later reported to have been of the compound type. The high-pressure cylinder was new, and the low-pressure cylinder was taken from Atlas.

=== Relaunch ===
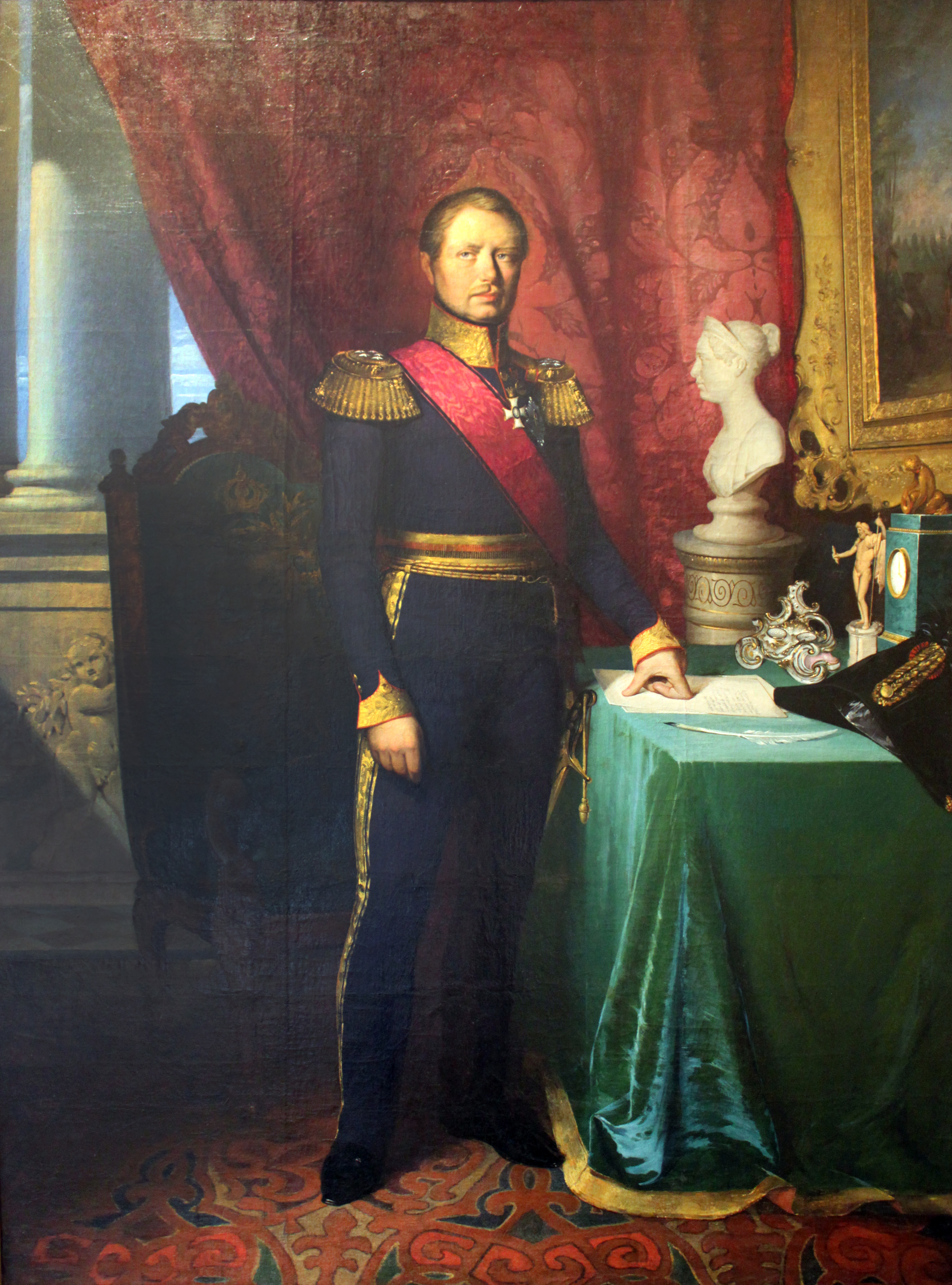
William I of Württemberg

The original plan for new engines somehow seems to have got a much wider scope. In the second half of 1834, somebody visited Fijenoord. He dated a report of his visit to 28 October 1834. During his visit he observed the 190 feet long steamship Pylades in the harbor, and on a parallel slipway, a 220 feet long steamboat. The latter was about to be launched the next day, and to enter service in the early spring of 1835. On a later visit in 1835 our visitor noted that the steamboat had indeed been commissioned, and that he had made a trip with her in summer. He also noted that De Nederlander had been lengthened by 15 meters, and that another boat would be lengthened by 18 meters. NSM was obviously into lengthening her steamboats. Longer vessels were made possible by the use of iron elements and probably helped to diminish the draft of the boats.

=== Service of the new Agrippina ===
In July 1835 Agrippina was in service between Rotterdam and Cologne. She was described as a colossal, but elegant boat of '200 feet' length, with three masts and 50 beds. The length of 200 feet seems to contradict her identification as the steamboat observed at Fijenoord in 1834. Here, the problem is in the use of different feet. The Fijenoord shipyard used English measurements for machines and boilers, but Amsterdam feet of 0.2831 m for shipbuilding. If the observers in Cologne used the common Rheinfuß of 0.314 m, the identification of the 220 feet long boat observed in 1834 with our Agrippina is even more solid. The difference between 220 Amsterdam feet and 200 Rheinfuß is less than 50 cm.

On 27 August 1836 Agrippina, commanded by Captain Cranenbroek left Düsseldorf with the third Garde Landwehr battalion on board. This unit was commanded by Major F.W. Menckhoff, and was about to join in large scale maneuvers near Koblenz. For the occasion Agrippina had been decorated with the arms of Prussia. The use of Agrippina was of great use to the men of the battalion. On 28 August the about 600 men of the battalion arrived in Koblenz.

In July 1837 Agrippina transported the King of Württemberg and the princesses Maria and Sophia, as well as a large escort from Cologne to The Hague. The company travelled by the names of Count and Countesses of Teck, so it did not turn into a state visit. On 6 July the company arrived in Nijmegen, where it spent the night in the Logement de Plaats Roijaal. On the morrow it continued towards The Hague on board Agrippina.

=== Von Strombeck's trip ===
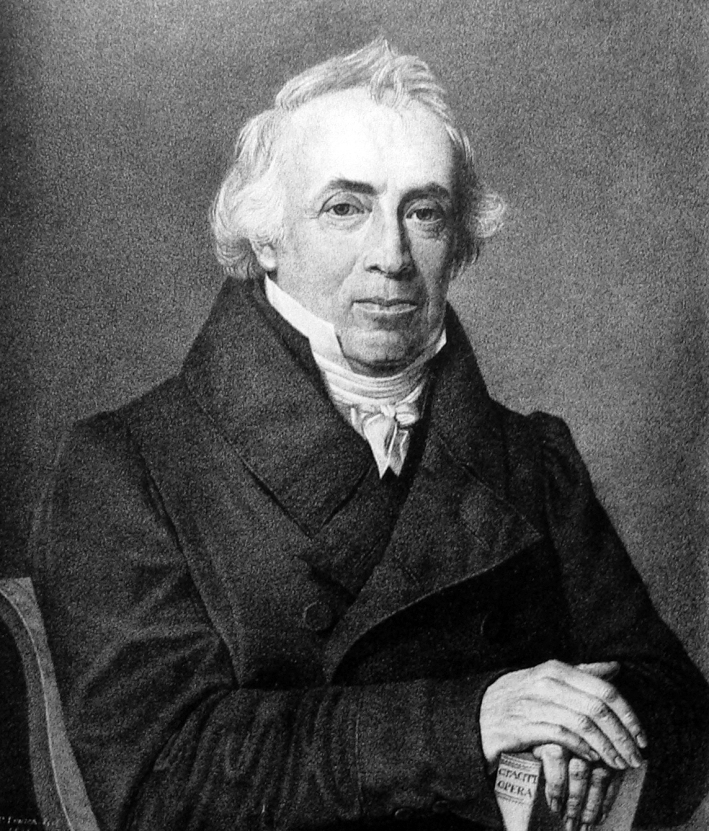
Friedrich Karl von Strombeck

In 1837 Friedrich Karl von Strombeck made a trip on board Agrippina. At the NSM office on the Boompjes, he bought a ticket for a trip to Mainz. It cost 26 Prussian Thaler and 5 groschen for a place in the great cabin. From Cologne, a ship of the PRDG would bring him to Mainz. On 13 July at 8 AM Agrippina left Rotterdam. Von Strombeck was impressed by the steamer with its 120 horse power. The company on deck reminded him of the arcades of a busy Spa town. There were many, mostly Dutch ladies, young and old in elegant dresses. Some young men wore Italian boater hats. Many older man wore travel hats, while some even wore spurs and a horse whip.

Von Strombeck found the great cabin very elegant. It had large mirrors, polished mahogany, and brass ornaments. On the tables were newspapers in three or four languages. It even had a small library, and when a young lady asked Von Strombeck what he did, he 'could satisfy his author's vanity' by showing her his entry in the Brockhaus Enzyklopädie. Near Dordrecht the rudder hit something, and the cogwheel that connected to the rudder broke in three pieces. A temporary fix was made with ropes and pulleys and six sailors pulling to move the rudder. After many stops, Agrippina reached Nijmegen in the evening, where Von Strombeck slept in the Hotel des Pays Bas.

At 7am, Agrippina continued to Cologne. At many stations, she laid still for some time, and lowered her stairs. Small boats with red flags then quickly transferred passengers. At Emmerich am Rhein a stop was made for customs, which checked part of the luggage. At dusk the steamer was near Duisburg, Von Strombeck went to bed in a small room in front of the machinery, with 8 or 10 small beds. There was an argand lamp and a facility to wash. Somewhere in the night, the makeshift fix for the rudder broke, and Agrippina hit something, causing the lamp to be extinguished. Von Strombeck did not get much sleep, especially because of the noise that the transfer of cargo in Düsseldorf made. In the morning he saw the 'smarter' passengers which had spent the night on the couches of the great cabin. Agrippina then reached Cologne before noon. Here Von Strombeck spent the night at the Hotel de Belle Vue in Deutz. He would continue his voyage on the Concordia

=== The Gutenberg celebrations in Mainz ===
From 13 to 16 August 1837 the city of Mainz organized a huge celebration to commemorate the invention of the printing press by Johannes Gutenberg. On 15 August there was a maritime spectacle on the Rhine. Nearly 300 vessels formed an immense rectangle within which the games took place. There were about 50,000 spectators, many on board the vessels. Near the quay was a new steamboat with princes and princesses, invitees, and local authorities. This boat was the podium for the awards, and would of course be christened Gutenberg. Across from the Gutenberg lay 'the beautiful Dutch three-master' Agrippina. On board she had a numerous military band, the direction of the games, and a number of guns operated by the Austrian artillery.

The opening event consisted of 12 boats rowing the competitors, who stood at the sterns, dressed as Neapolitan fisherman. The first game consisted of recovering two flags and seizing a large eel. The first flag was to be gained by climbing a rope dangling from the yard of the main mast of Agrippina. The other flag was at the end of a 40 feet bowsprit. The eel dangled from a rope spanned high over the games area, and had to be grabbed by quickly rowing a boat under it, and then jumping to grab it. The main game was about the competitors using their lance to push their adversary into the water.

=== Further service ===
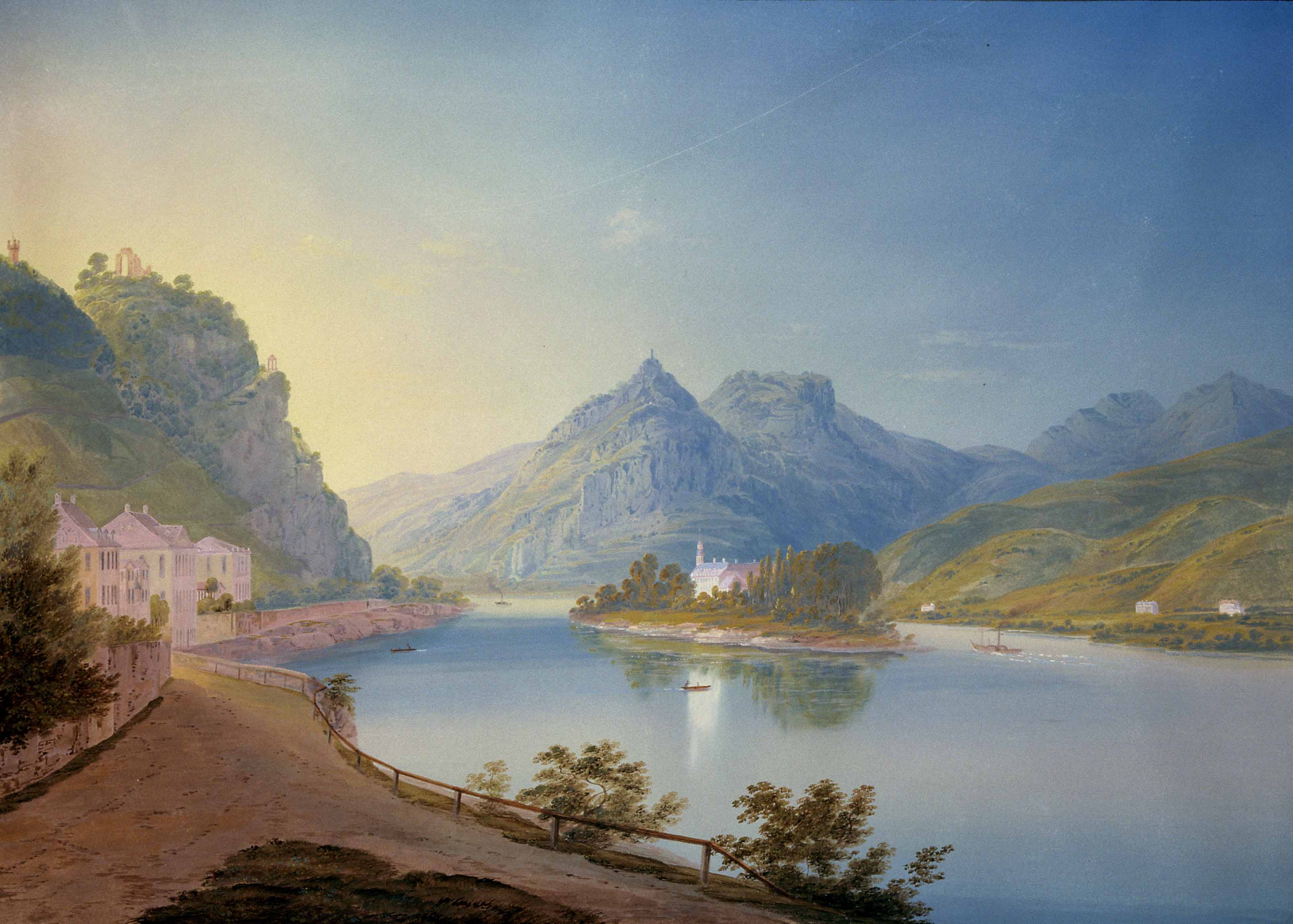
Rolandseck, Nonnenwerth and Siebengebirge in 1840

In September 1838, the Dutch church minister (predikant) H.F.T. Fockens made a trip along the Rhine together with his brother, who was an officer in the Dutch navy. Fockens published about this trip in a literary magazine in 1839. After travelling to Cologne by stagecoach, the brothers took Agrippina from Cologne upstream. The brothers paid 15 Thaler or 27 guilders for a place in the first cabin. Some English passengers had hired the best place, the pavilion, and parked their three coaches on the front deck. Between Cologne and Bonn, Fockens met the Philosopher Christian Kapp (1798-1874)

In Bonn, the brothers stayed at the Hotel de Trêves on the Great Market. Fockens main interest was to visit the University of Bonn, and to meet the staff of the faculty of Theology. Apart from that, they also visited the regular tourist attractions like Rolandseck and climbed the Drachenfels. At 9 in the evening, the brothers again boarded a steamboat in Königswinter and spent the night on board. In the early morning of 14 September, they arrived in Koblenz, where they spent the night in Hotel Bellevue.

At 6:30 AM on 15 September, the brothers embarked on a steamboat from Koblenz to Biebrich. On board was the usual very international company of tourists. Between Sankt Goar and Kaub the boat's staff often played a trumpet and fired cannon to hear the echo of the mountains. From the wall cannon were fired in salute at the steamboat, which had first come into service, and was called Agrippina. After disembarking at Biebrich, the brothers continued to Frankfurt by coach. From there they went to Mainz by coach. Here, they again boarded Agrippina downstream on 17 September. After 10.5 hours they were back in Cologne. Here they boarded a steamboat of the Dampfschiffahrts-Gesellschaft für den Nieder- und Mittelrhein to Arnhem.

=== Accidents in 1841 ===
In 1841, the steamboat season began early, when NSM's Agrippina and Ludwig arrived in Nijmegen on 27 January.

At about 3pm on 25 September 1841, two steamboats were seen approaching the town of Rees in Germany. The heavy exhaust plumes announced that both were making a lot of steam, even while they were going downstream. It were Drusus of the IJssel Stoomboot Maatschappij, and NSM's Agrippina. Very near to Rees, Agrippina succeeded in passing Drusus to get to the pier. Because of her speed, Agrippina then turned too quickly and too short, making the pavilion, which was on the stern, hit the pier. The damage was reportedly heavy to both ship and pier. On 2 October, the NSM reacted to the report by stating that Agrippina arrived on schedule on the 26th, and left again according to schedule on the 27th. According to NSM, there was only some damage to the artistic carvings on the stern, and to the rear fence, and lifeboat. It was also noted that Agrippina was much faster than Drusus, and often overtook her on the Rhine. Furthermore, Rees was not a regular stop for Drusus.

Whatever the truth of the accident, after some more trips, Agrippina left Rotterdam under Captain de Ruyter on 19 October. She then suddenly became very leaky on her port side while she was near Tiel. Within in a few moments, there were several feet of water in the cabins. The captain then saw no other option but to beach Agrippina near Wamel. All the passengers were saved. Attempts were made to safe the 120 tons of cargo, by bringing it on deck and transloading it on barges, but most of it was ruined. The later explanation for the accident was that the boat had hit a submerged beam, which had bent inwards an iron part of the machine. The movement of the paddle wheel would then have caused this part to create a leak. Some newspapers had details about there being 4 feet of water in the hold before Agrippina was beached, and that the cargo consisted mainly of highly perishable sugar and saltpeter.

=== Tows the first iron barge ===
The shift from wooden barges to iron barges was a development that would allow cargo transport on the Rhine to withstand the competition of the railways and road transport. The NSM had tried establish a tug service on the Rhine since 1825, but this was not commercially viable without government subsidies. NSM then became the first company to use its own iron barges instead of towing wooden barges owned by others. The idea was that these iron barges could be made much bigger than wooden barges, and could so economize on staff. They would also be used year-round, instead of only when the wind was unfavorable. Because the hull weight was less, they would not have as much draft as wooden boats. Later experiments showed that with the same speed and expense of coal, iron barges could transport 50% more cargo. All combined, the iron barge would make towing cargo upstream profitable.

In 1841, NSM launched the iron barge Rijn I. She measured 180 by 24 feet, and had a depth of hold of 11 English feet. In 1841 Rijn I made a trip up the Rhine towed by horses. On 24 December 1841, she started a trip up the Rhine towed by Agrippina. On 26 May both arrived in Cologne, Agrippina towing Rijn I of captain J.J. Visser. Agrippina had 1,250 cwt on board. Rijn I was loaded with 4,849 cwt, giving her a draft of 3.75 feet. The trip had been accomplished in the short time of 38 hours of steaming. It was the first trip of a towed iron barge on the Rhine. In 1842 Agrippina also towed iron barges.

=== Final years with NSM ===
In the early morning of 21 October 1843, a coal barge that descended the Rhine hit Agrippina, which was lying before the NSM office at De Boompjes. The barge sunk immediately, and had to be raised. Agrippina probably suffered little, because on 16 November she arrived in Mannheim towing the iron Rhein II.

== The end ==
The NSM had a close relation with the Mannheim entrepreneur Mathias Stinnes. Stinnes owned mines and was the largest barge owner on the Rhine. When NSM was in financial trouble and diminished shipping activities, it rented out Agrippina and Concordia to Stinnes in 1844. In 1846 Agrippina was broken up.

In 1850 or 1851 a new steamboat named Agrippina was laid down at Fijenoord.
