= De Rijn (1825) =

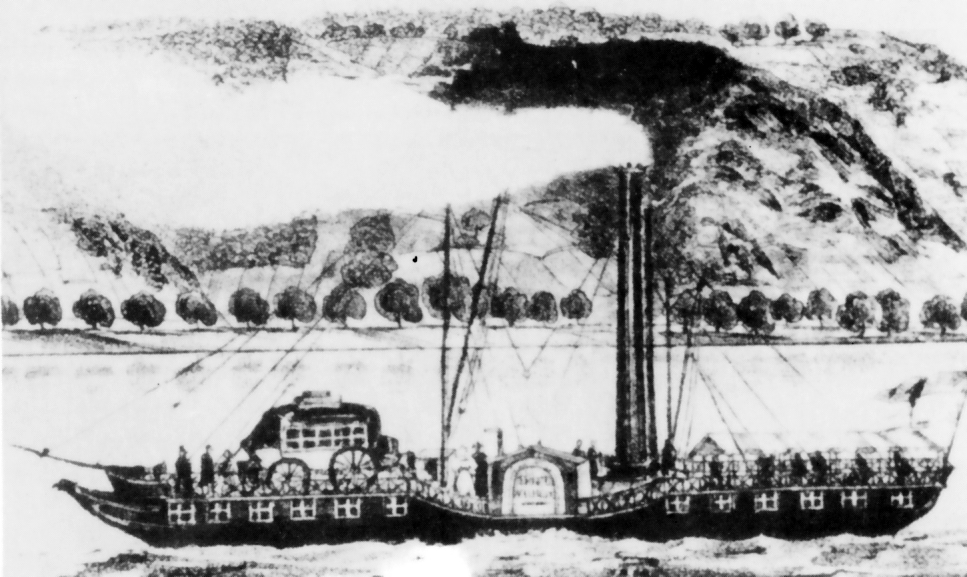
- De Rijn in about 1830

History
- Name: De Rijn, Frederik Wilhelm (17 October 1825) De Rijn (1826-27)
- Namesake: Rhine
- Builder: Hoogendijk, Capelle aan den IJssel, directed by Nederlandsche Stoomboot Maatschappij, Rotterdam
- Launched: August 1825

History
- Name: Prinz Friedrich von Preußen
- Namesake: Rhine
- Acquired: 1829

History
- Name: Prins Frederik
- Acquired: 1831
- Fate: broken up 1844

General characteristics
- Type: Paddle steamboat
- Displacement: 190 metric tons (190 long tons)
- Length: 45.72 m over all; 42.47 m (150 Amsterdam feet)
- Beam: 4.88 m
- Draught: 0.99 m
- Installed power: 60 hp (45 kW)
- Propulsion: 2 paddle wheels

De Rijn was an early Dutch, and later Prussian steamboat that plied the Rhine. On 17 October 1825 she was renamed Friedrich Wilhelm. In 1829 she was renamed Prinz Friedrich von Preußen, and in 1831 Prins Frederik. De Rijn was the fourth German steamboat that provided regular service on the Rhine.

== Boat characteristics ==
The Nederlandsche Stoomboot Maatschappij was a shipping line with two executives. The engineer and former navy officer Gerhard Moritz Roentgen (1795–1852) was the executive responsible for its fleet. NSM was sponsored by King William I of the Netherlands, but in return he expected NSM to further the establishment of an infrastructure to build and operate steamships. NSM designed the engines and hull of De Rijn. Cockerill built the engines, and Hoogendijk shipyard in Capelle aan den IJssel built the hull.

In September 1825, someone in Cologne gave the dimensions of De Rijn as 150 feet (46 m) long with a beam of 16.75 feet (5.11 m). As NSM used the Amsterdam foot of 0.283133 m for ship measurements, this gives her a length of 42.47 m. In Cologne she could still be 150, because the old Cologne feet was 0.2873925 m, giving only a minimal difference. The same report gave the paddle wheels a diameter of 12 feet 9 inch. They were covered, and bore the texts: 'Nederlandsche Stoomboot Maatschappij' and 'De Rhijn'. Later in September 1825, someone in Mainz reported De Rijn as 120–130 feet long. This cannot be explained by assuming a reference to the 0.25 m foot that was official in Mainz, nor by assuming the use of the still regular old Mainz foot of 0.2915 m.

De Rijn had two engines of 30 hp each. The paddle wheels made 28 to 30 turns a minute.

== Service for NSM ==
=== Exploration on the Rhine ===
On 31 August 1825 De Rijn was ready. In September she steamed up the Rhine for the Dampfschiffahrts-Gesellschaft von Rhein und Main which had been founded in Mainz. Roentgen would personally command this trip from Cologne upstream to Kehl and Strassburg, which was to prove that steamboats could be used that far upstream.

The first stop was in Cologne. The Cologne chamber of commerce had been in contact with NSM for a while, and had come up with the idea to let King Frederick William III of Prussia make a trip on a steamboat. On 11 September De Rijn with three representatives of the chamber of commerce and the band of the 28th regiment, left Cologne to go upstream and arrived in Coblenz in the evening. On 14 September she left to take the king and his company back to Cologne. All along the Rhine, the public and authorities had gathered to see the king. Their hurrah's, music and gun salutes were answered by the king, and by his son Albert firing the salute guns on board. 5 hours and 15 minutes after departure, De Rijn was in Cologne. Soon after, the merchants and the NSM requested the king to allow them to rename the boat Friedrich Wilhelm.

De Rijn now reembarked on her trip upstream. She was pulled through the Das wilde Gefähr and the Binger Loch. On 17 September she arrived in Mainz after making a 3 hours 35 minutes trip from Bingen am Rhein. The public was very interested and was allowed to visit the ship. Immediately after arrival, the merchants from Frankfurt (represented by Bethmann, Dusan and Brevillier) and those of Mainz contracted with NSM. In the evening there was a dinner hosted by the Mainz chamber of commerce, with Roentgen, the merchants, the Central Commission for Navigation on the Rhine, Johann Friedrich Cotta and others attending. The content of the September contract was not yet known.

On 18 September at 6 am De Rijn left Mainz for Mannheim, where she arrived at 6 pm. At 6:15 am on the 19th she continued upstream, passing Speyer at 11 am. In the evening of the 19th she arrived at Eggenstein-Leopoldshafen, where she was visited by Grand Duke Louis of Baden. On 21 September De Rijn reached Kehl, proving that steamboats would be used on the Upper Rhine.

On 22 September at 11 am De Rijn left Kehl for Mainz. On the return journey, there was a pleasure trip at Mainz on 24 September. It was attended by about a hundred people. These were primarily merchants, members of the Central Commission for Navigation on the Rhine from Mainz, and officials from the governments, the military, and the chambers of commerce. After dinner, the Austrian garrison's band provided the ball's music. On 27 September De Rijn arrived back in Köln.

=== Rotterdam - Cologne shipping line ===
On 28 September De Rijn left Cologne for Rotterdam. Together with Stad Nijmegen, she was then used for a regular freight service between Antwerp, Rotterdam, and Cologne.

King Frederick William then allowed De Rijn to be renamed Friedrich Wilhelm to commemorate his trip on board from Coblenz to Cologne. He also allowed the PRDG to in time transfer the name to the boat that PRDG wanted to order. The renaming ceremony took place on 17 October 1825, and was part of big festivities to commemorate the Battle of Leipzig.

In late November 1825 Friedrich Wilhelm hit the pontoon bridge of Wesel while on a return trip from Cologne. The accident was blamed on the supposedly careless captain, and caused a lot of damage because Friedrich Wilhelm took half of the pontoons with her. Due to the season, the bridge could not be repaired until spring. Bases on the provision that PRDG could transfer the name, De Rijn got her old name back someday between the launch of PRDG's Friedrich Wilhelm in April 1826 and her commissioning in May 1827.

== Service for Preußisch-Rheinische Dampfschiffahrtsgesellschaft (PRDG) ==
The Preußisch-Rheinische Dampfschiffahrts-Gesellschaft (PRDG) in Cologne, the later Köln-Düsseldorfer acquired two steamboats in 1827. Agrippina was to be her third boat, but proved to have too much draft. PRDG and NSM then made a deal whereby PRDG would not accept Agrippina, but would get the renovated De Rijn for the high price of 165,000 guilders. After delivery in 1829 De Rijn was renamed Prinz Friedrich von Preußen and joined Concordia and Friedrich Wilhelm on the service from Cologne to Mainz.

PRDG carefully logged the time that her three boats used for their trips. In 1830 Prinz Friedrich took 10 hours and 39 minutes for the 200 km downstream trip from Mainz to Cologne. The upstream trip from Cologne to Coblenz took 14 hours and 22 minutes. From Coblenz to Mainz 14 hours and 11 minutes. The total for a round trip thus came to 39 hours and 12 minutes. Concordia took only 31 hours and 44 minutes to do the same. PRDG therefore decided to sell Prinz Friedrich back to NSM. The price was 60,000 guilders, and PRDG got Prinses Marianne, which had engines by Cockerill

== Again steaming for the NSM ==
Back with the NSM Prinz Friedrich got the convenient name Prins Frederik.

In Cologne Sir Walter Scott boarded Prinz Friedrich on 9 June 1832, heading for Rotterdam. He sat in his coach reading a book, when he got a cerebral infarction near Emmerich. After local medical treatment, he was disembarked at Nijmegen, where he was treated by doctors Van Roggen and Van Eldik. On 12 June 1832 a still very ill Walter Scott was in Rotterdam, where be boarded the Batavier to London.

Prins Frederik was broken up in 1844.
