= Friedrich Wilhelm (1826) =

Destroyed German steamboat

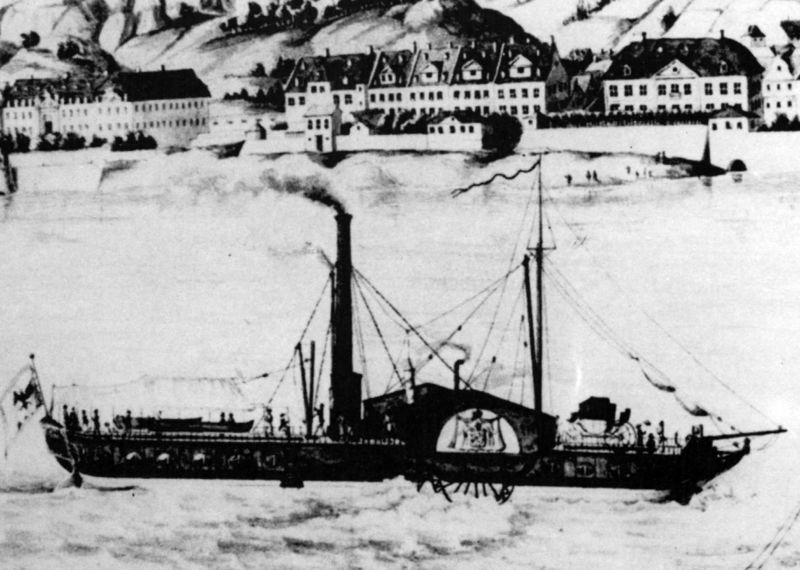
- Friedrich Wilhelm c. 1830

History

Prussia
- Name: Friedrich Wilhelm
- Builder: Design: Nederlandsche Stoomboot Maatschappij, Rotterdam; Hull: Smit Alblasserdam
- Launched: April 1826
- Stricken: Broken up 1846

General characteristics
- Type: Paddle steamboat
- Displacement: 240 metric tons (240 long tons)
- Length: 42.7 m (140 ft 1 in) oa.
- Beam: 4.88 m (16 ft 0 in)
- Draught: 1.2 m (4 ft) (empty)
- Installed power: 70 hp (52 kW)
- Propulsion: 2 paddle wheels of 3.76 m (12 ft 4 in) ∅
- Capacity: 60 DWT or 30 last

Friedrich Wilhelm was the second German steamboat that steamed a regular schedule on the Rhine. She was the first steamboat which had been ordered by the Preußisch-Rheinische Dampfschiffahrts-Gesellschaft (PRDG), the later Köln-Düsseldorfer.

== Context ==
In 1825 the Dampfschiffahrts-Gesellschaft von Rhein und Main (DGRM) was founded in Mainz. It ordered three steamboats at the Nederlandsche Stoomboot Maatschappij (Dutch Steamboat Comp.), with which it cooperated. These were meant to steam between Mainz and Mannheim, from Mannheim to Kehl and Strasbourg and between Mainz and Frankfurt am Main. The idea was that the Nederlandsche Stoomboot Maatschappij would offer transport between Rotterdam and Cologne.

The Preußisch Rheinische Dampfschiffahrts-Gesellschaft“ (PRDG) would steam from Cologne to Mainz, and ordered two steamboats. In this plan the three companies would cooperate and monopolize steam transport on the Rhine. In October 1825 the order for the steamboats for DGRM and PRDG was finalized. While Friedrich Wilhelm was ordered by PRDG, the identical Concordia was ordered by DGRM.

== Ship characteristics ==
Friedrich Wilhelm was a sister ship of Concordia. An overview of early steamboats built in the Netherlands indeed has both sized at 240 ton, with engines by John Seaward & Co., and built at Alblasserdam.

Friedrich Wilhelm was 43.90 meters (144 ft 0 in) long overall, had a beam of 5.0 m (16 ft 5 in), and a maximum draft of 0.98 m (3 ft 3 in). Others say the draft of Concordia was 4 feet while empty. Friedrich Wilhelm was measured at 240 tons, and could transport 30 last, i.e. about 60 metric tons. As she was reported equal to Concordia, we can assume that she also transported 230 passengers maximum. Apart from passengers and cargo she also transported horses and wagons.

The English steam engine by John Seaward & Co. had a single low-pressure cylinder of 70 horsepower (52 kW) at 30 revolutions a minute. It had a flywheel to evenly distribute the power of the single cylinder. The flywheel was on one side of the engine, the boiler was on the other side. The two paddle wheels had a diameter of 3.76 m (12 ft 4 in).

In September 1827 an extensive description of Friedrich Wilhelm was given by somebody travelling from Mainz to Cologne.

== Service ==
=== De Rijn: the Dutch Fredrich Wilhelm ===
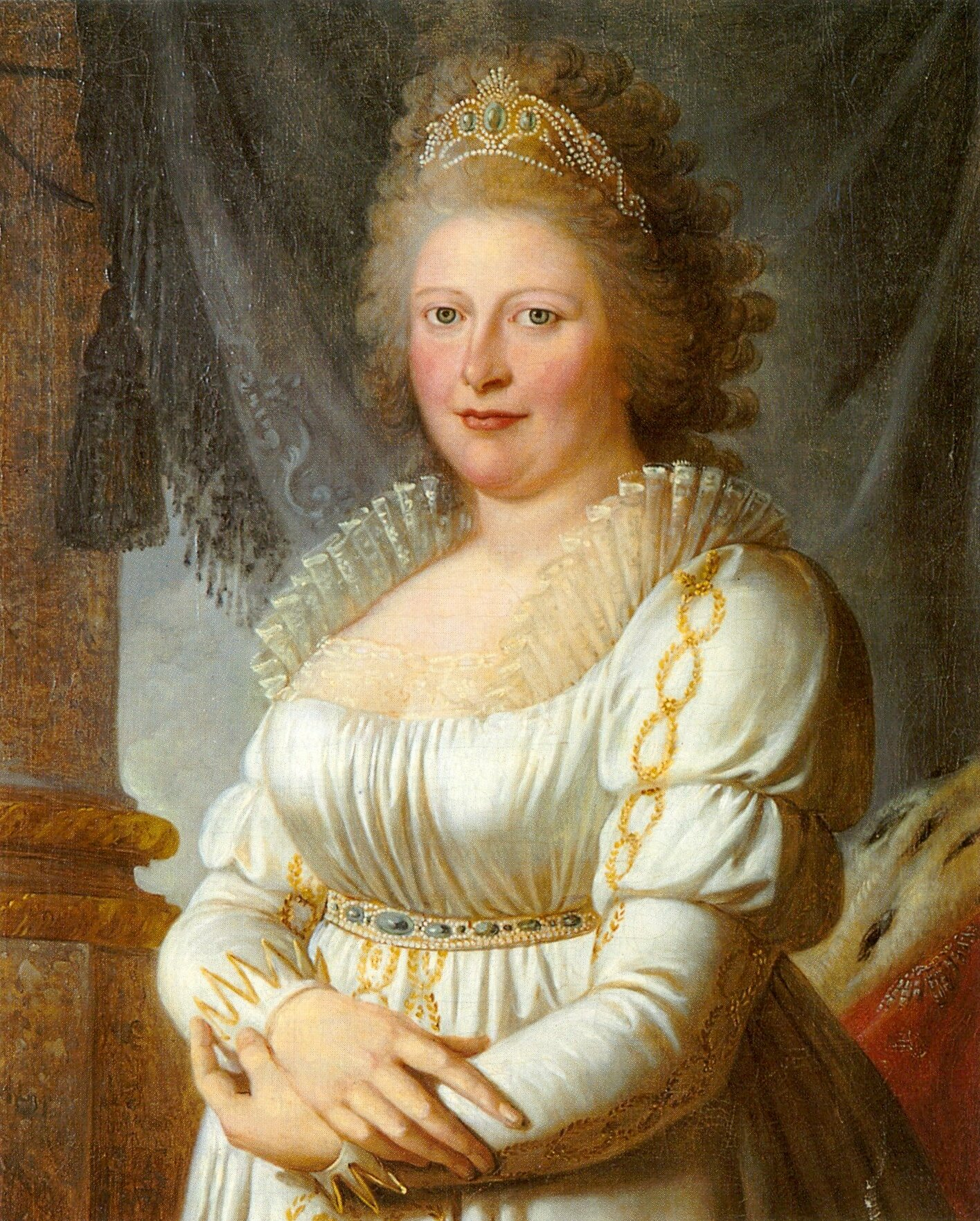
Queen Charlotte.

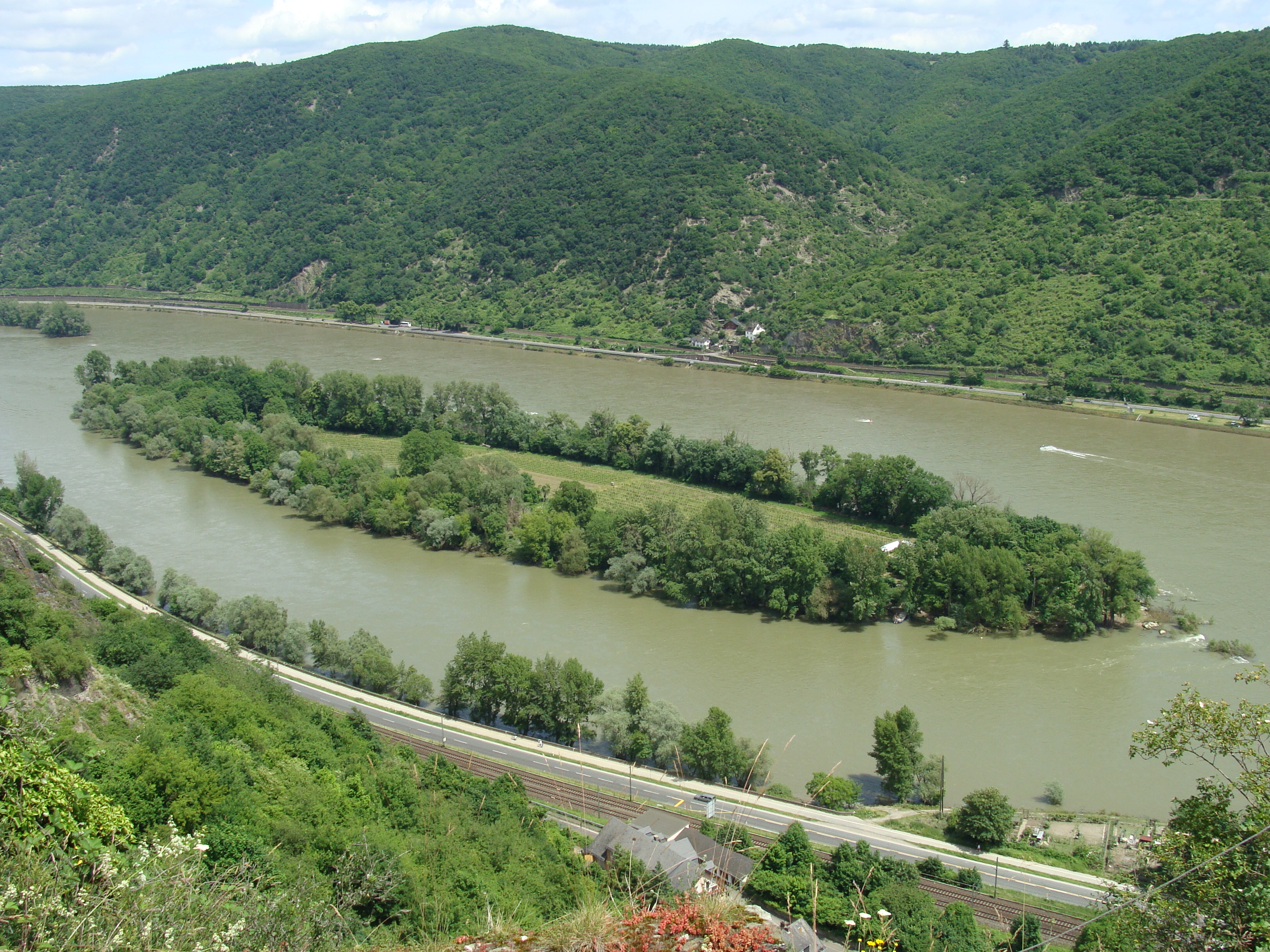
Das wilde Gefähr is top left of the island

In August 1825 the NSM had launched De Rijn, with which NSM demonstrated the possibilities of steam navigation south of Cologne. On 17 October 1825 De Rijn was renamed Friedrich Wilhelm, in Dutch Frederik Wilhelm. This later led to much confusion when our Friedrich Wilhelm entered service. The step that is often missed, was that the permit to rename De Rijn to Friedrich Wilhelm allowed PRDG to transfer the name to the first ship she would put into service. Therefore, De Rijn got her old name back someday between the launch of our Friedrich Wilhelm in April 1826 and her commissioning in May 1827.

In 1829 the possibilities for later confusion increased when PRDG bought the NSM De Rijn, and renamed her Prinz Friedrich von Preußen, which would of course be shortened to Friedrich. In April 1829 Prinz Friedrich von Preußen joined Concordia and Friedrich Wilhelm on the service from Cologne to Mainz. Our Friedrich Wilhelm would indeed be mistaken for De Rijn renamed Friedrich Wilhelm.

=== Construction ===
Friedrich Wilhelm was launched by a shipyard in Alblasserdam in April 1826. This shipyard could have been L. Smit en Zoon in Kinderdijk, which was also in Alblasserdam according to the source. An alternative is Jan Smit Czn. in Alblasserdam. NSM's own technical facilities shipyard in IJsselmonde might have been used to place and or finish the engines.

=== Maiden voyage with dowager queen Charlotte ===
In order to generate publicity, the first trip of Friedrich Wilhelm, destined for service north of Mainz, would be about transporting a famous person. This was her majesty Charlotte dowager queen of Württemberg. On 1 June she was to leave Mainz, in order to arrive in Düsseldorf in the evening. On the morrow she would travel from there to Rotterdam, from whence the sailing yacht Royal Sovereign would take her to her brother the King of England.

On 27 May 1827 at 1 PM, Friedrich Wilhelm arrived in Cologne. She was received by a gun salute, and the music of the 28th regiment. She was found to be 150 feet long. She had a heavily gilded figurehead of the King of Prussia, and had the Prussian arms on the wheel chests. The press reported her speed, beauty, and how the comfort and beauty of the interior (again) surpassed everything that had been observed before. On 31 May at 9 AM, Friedrich Wilhelm left Mainz with Charlotte on board. On Friday 1 June at 6 PM, they arrived before Dordrecht. Here the Princess Royal was received by local authorities, the British ambassador Charles Bagot, the British consul, and Captain William Hoste of the Royal Sovereign.

Friday at midnight Friedrich Wilhelm continued to Bath, Netherlands, where Charlotte would transfer to the Royal Sovereign, which would bring her to Greenwich. Friedrich Wilhelm arrived at Bath shortly before 8 AM, and within two hours Charlotte, her escort and goods had been transferred. Due to her weight, Charlotte herself had to be lifted aboard Royal Sovereign on a chair that was hoisted. Due to bad weather, the Royal Sovereign then had to leave Bath, and anchor before Fort Rammekens. Friedrich Wilhelm left Bath to arrive in Rotterdam at 7 PM on 2 June.

=== Service on the Rhine ===
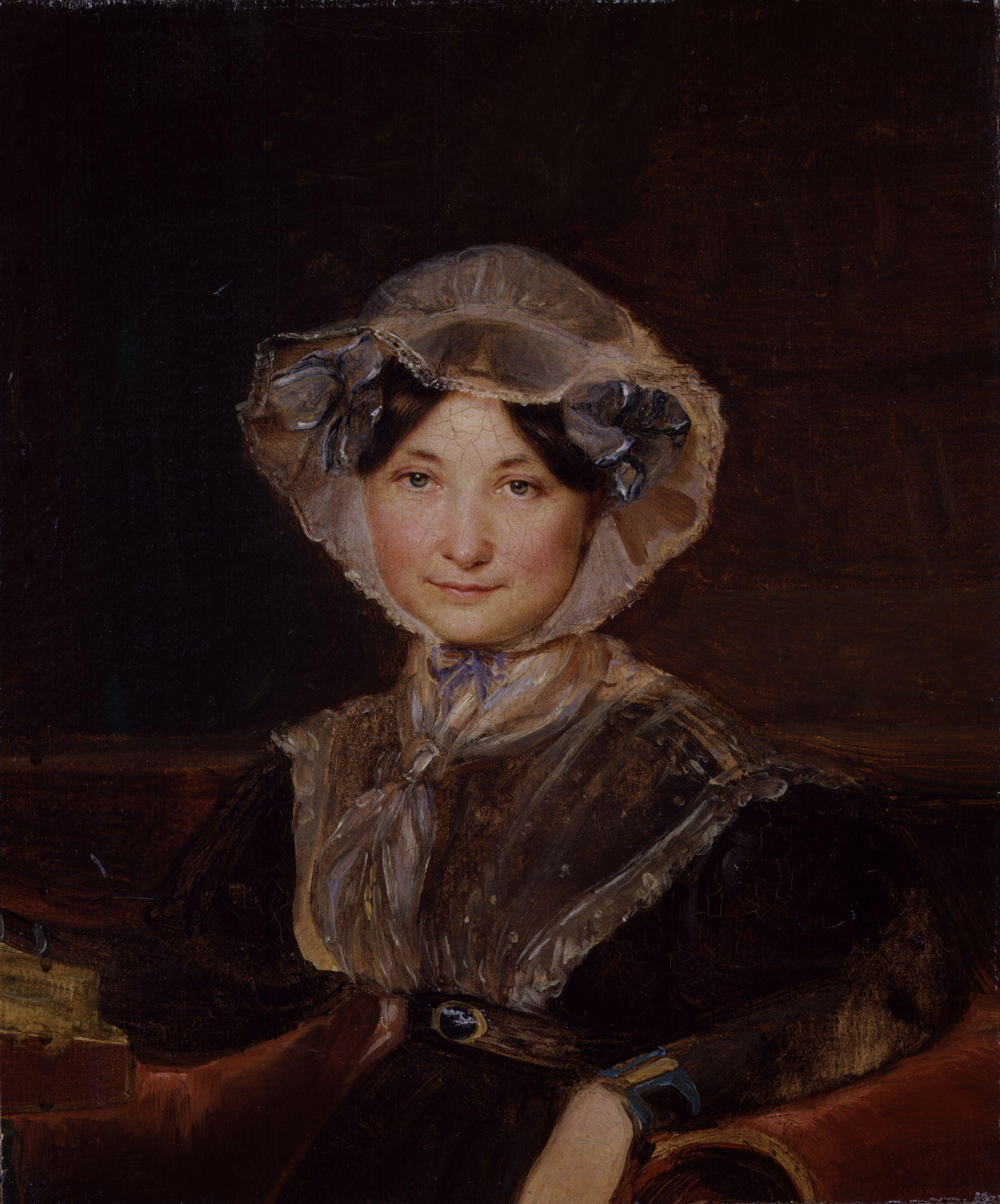
Portrait of Frances Trollope by Auguste Hervieu, 1832

After her maiden voyage Friedrich Wilhelm started to steam according to schedule on the Rhine between Cologne and Mainz. In the first year, the weight of the machines made the boat lose her original form, and led to leaks at the fireplaces. She also needed a boiler repair. It led to a serious repair at NSM's shipyard Fijenoord.

From 1 March 1828 until October Friedrich Wilhelm steamed according to schedule. In late October the level of Rhine near Caub became so low that Friedrich Wilhelm tried to pass Das wilde Gefähr. Against the stream this had never been done before, but on 25 October Friedrich Wilhelm succeeded with the help of 8 horses towing her. From 29 October the level of the Rhine became so low that Stadt Frankfurt was used on the last stretch until Mainz. On 10 November shipping was halted, and Friedrich Wilhelm was sent to the safe harbor of Düsseldorf, where she would undergo maintenance.

=== 1833: Frances Milton Trollope ===
In 1833 Frances Milton Trollope made a trip to the Rhine, leading to her second book: Belgium and Western Germany in 1833. She first went to Belgium, and then to Aachen and the Rhine at Cologne. Here she boarded Friedrich Wilhelm on 8 July. From Coblenz to Mainz she was on board Prinses Marianne. She gave a description of some of the characters on board this ship.

=== To Holland ===
In 1840 Friedrich Wilhelm was sold back to NSM.

=== Fate ===
In 1846 Friedrich Wilhelm was broken up.
