= Concordia (1826) =

First German steamboat on the Rhine

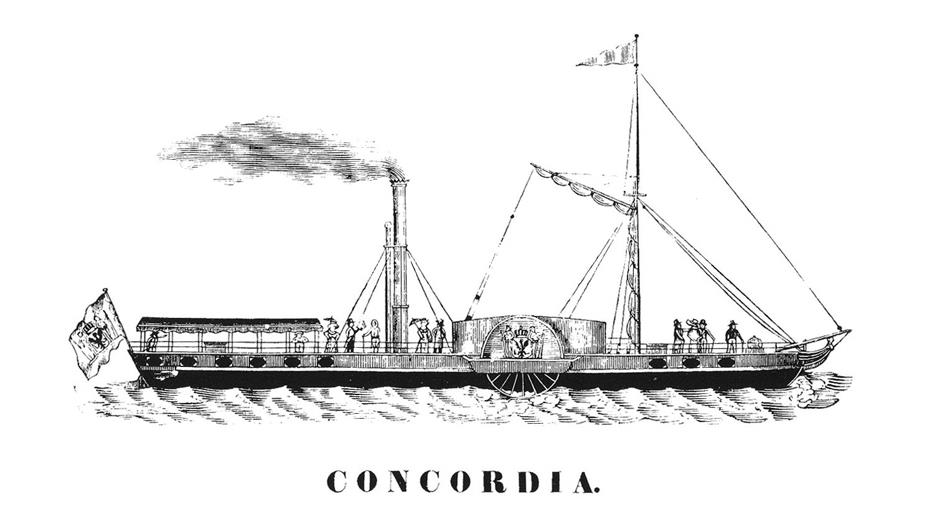
- Concordia in about 1830

History

Prussia
- Name: Concordia
- Builder: Nederlandse Stoomboot Maatschappij, Rotterdam
- Launched: July 1826

History

Netherlands
- Name: Concordia
- Acquired: 1840
- Fate: broken up 1845

General characteristics
- Type: Paddle steamboat
- Tonnage: 60 dwt
- Displacement: 240 metric tons (240 long tons)
- Length: 42.7 m over all
- Beam: 4.88 m
- Draught: 4 feet (empty)
- Installed power: 70 hp (52 kW)
- Propulsion: 2 paddle wheels of 3,76 m ∅

Concordia was the first German steamboat on the Rhine. On 1 May 1827 she made her first trip from Mainz to Köln.

== Context ==
In 1825 the Dampfschiffahrts-Gesellschaft von Rhein und Main (DGRM) was founded in Mainz. It ordered three ships at the Nederlandsche Stoomboot Maatschappij (Dutch Steamboat Comp.), with which it cooperated. Concordia was meant to steam between Mainz and Mannheim, Ludwig from Mannheim to Kehl and Strasbourg, and Stadt Frankfurt would steam between and between Mainz and Frankfurt am Main.

The order for the ships was part of a plan by three companies to cooperate and monopolize steam transport on the Rhine. The idea was that the Nederlandsche Stoomboot Maatschappij would offer transport between Rotterdam and Cologne. The „Preußisch Rheinische Dampfschiffahrts-Gesellschaft“ (PRDG) would steam from Cologne to Mainz. Finally the DGRM would service the Upper Rhine.

== Ship characteristics ==
Concordia was 42.70 meters long, had a beam of 4.88 meter and displaced 240 tons. She could transport 230 passengers and just 60 tons (1,173 hundredweight) cargo. Apart from passengers and cargo she also transported horses and wagons. There are multiple references for her dimensions, for example one that says length 145 feet, beam in (including the wheels) 40 feet, and (empty) draught 4 feet.

The English steam engine by John Seaward & Co. had a single low-pressure cylinder of 70 hp at 30 turns a minute. It had a flywheel to evenly distribute the power of the single cylinder. The flywheel was on one side of the engine, the boiler was on the other side. The two paddle wheels had a diameter of 3.76 m. The boat had a special engine with which it could daily put water pressure on the boilers to check whether they were still sound. For Concordia this meant that 165 lb/inch was put on the boilers, while normal use was maximized at 55 lb/inch.

== Service ==
=== Not suitable for DGRM (first principal) ===
By 27 March 1827 Ludwig and Concordia destined for the Upper- and Middle Rhine were almost ready to leave Rotterdam for their final destinations. On 19 April Concordia left Cologne for Mainz, and reached Bingen am Rhein in the late evening. On the 20th some trials were held at the Binger Loch, which was passed with the help of four horses. In the evening of the 21st Concordia reached Mainz.

In Mainz a story circulated that after Concordia had reached Mainz, her draft was found to be too great for using her as a steamboat to Mannheim. On 26 April 1827 Concordia left Mainz again to steam to Cologne, and people began to suspect that she would be used for service between these cities. On 28 April Concordia was back in Mainz from Cologne. On 29 April she made an upstream pleasure trip of about 15 km to the vicinity of Oppenheim with a lot of local authorities. On 30 April Concordia took in cargo, and on 1 May she would steam back to Cologne. By then she was known to get used in a regular service between Cologne and Mainz.

=== Concordia opens regular shipping on the German Rhine ===
On 26 April 1827 the „Preußisch Rheinische Dampfschiffahrts-Gesellschaft“ (PRDG) had advertised that she would start the line between Cologne and Mainz according to a schedule in May. The trip from Mainz to Cologne on 1 May indeed fit this schedule. Somehow, the PRDG, which had been founded in Köln on 11 June 1826, was allowed to use Concordia for her line. This went so smoothly, that the transfer seems to have been planned before Concordia first arrived in Mainz on 21 April.

Whatever the details, Concordia opened PRDG's service between Köln and Mainz on 1 May 1827. On 26 May 1827, she was joined by the very similar Friedrich Wilhelm. The 200 km trip downstream from Mainz to Cologne took about 10 hours, which was much faster than the stagecoach. The upstream trip took 22 hours and 10 minutes of steaming. On the first day the boat went from Cologne to Koblenz. On the second day the boat went from Koblenz to Mainz.

=== Accident at Binger Loch ===
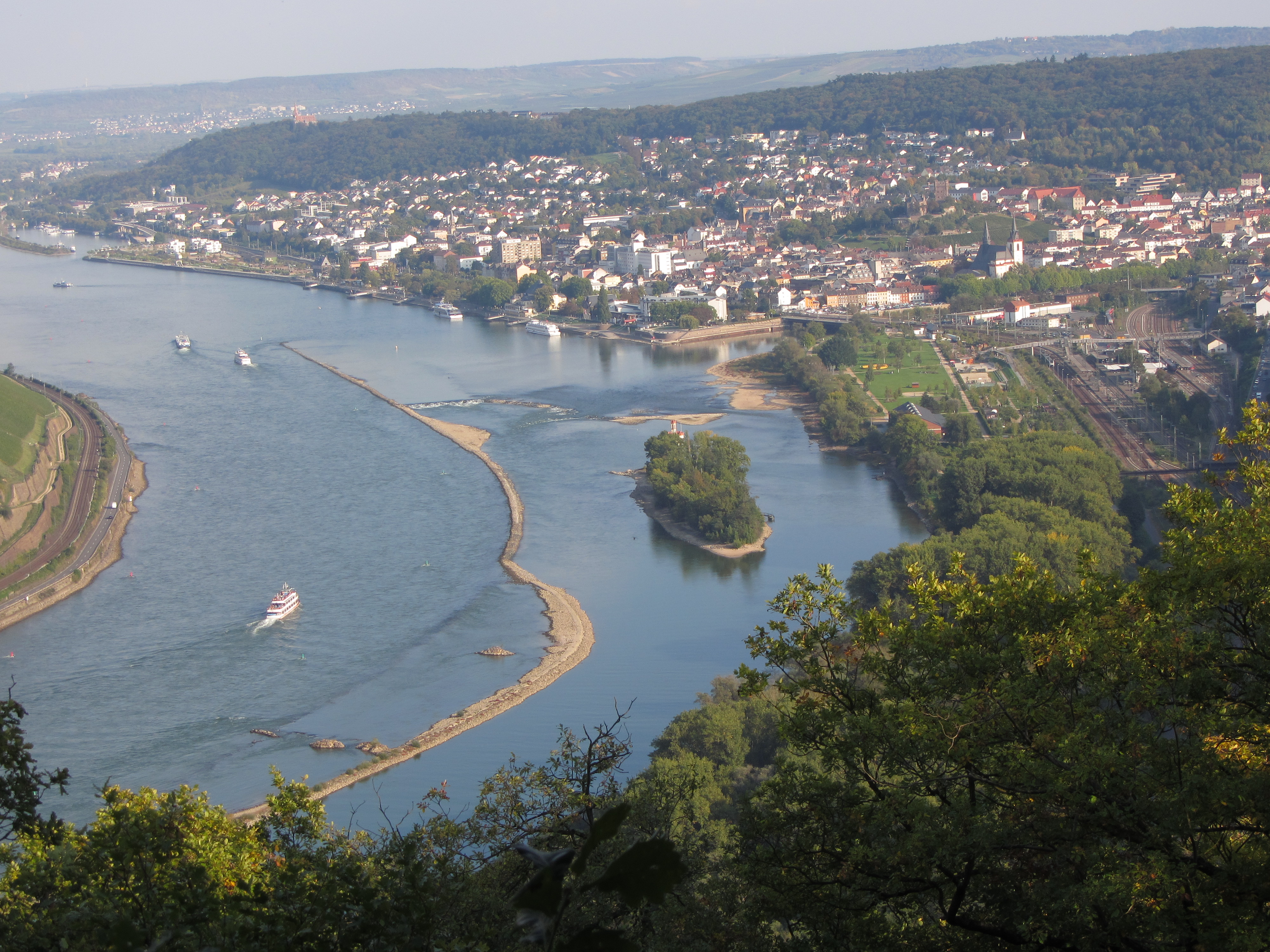
Binger Loch. Remains of the reef are on the bottom left.

On 11 September 1827 Concordia left Mainz with a large number of passengers. At Bingen, the pilot who normally guided the steamboats was absent. He was replaced by his brother, who had often guided the ship to Kaub in his absence. The skipper therefore took him aboard, and steamed to the Binger Loch. At the time this was still a very small opening in a quartzite reef just downstream of the Mouse Tower. It formed a natural weir, and was a formidable obstacle to shipping. The skipper noted that the pilot was not following the prescribed route, and held too much to the left. He notified the pilot, but it was too late, because the current already had the boat in its grip. The skipper stopped the engine, and the boat luckily got through the Loch.

However, just below the Loch, Concordia hit the Lochstein to the left. The shock made her turn, and she then again hit the rocks, now with her left side. The shock made that several passengers hit the deck, and got some mild concussions. The rising water inside the boat, and its changing color made the skipper conclude that Concordia was leaking. Therefore, the two pumps of the engines were engaged, as well as the hand pumps. The passengers were of course anxious to get off, but the skipper told them to wait for safe anchorage. Concordia then continued to Caub, where the skipper beached her after informing the passengers.

After the passengers and goods were transshipped, a large leak was discovered on the left side of the hull. With the help of local authorities and workers, the leak was patched up, and at 6 AM of 13 September Concordia continued to Cologne. The survival of the boat was attributed to its sturdy construction, and the engine providing speed and pump capacity.

On 16 September Concordia arrived at the NSM shipyard Fijenoord. She was easily pulled out of the water on the new patent slip, with engines and boilers still on board. In 6 days, she was completely repaired. On the 28th she departed again for Cologne, where she would have to resume service on 2 October. The accident led to plans to widen the Binger Loch from 24 to 40 feet.

=== Influence on tourism ===
The interior and facilities on board were thought to be magnificent and comfortable. While on board Concordia in 1827, the poet Friedrich von Matthisson wrote: One cannot imagine anything more elegant and comfortable than this steamboat. (The statement becomes understandable when the boat is compared to riding a horse for 10 hours, or being crammed into a stagecoach for 10 hours.)

One year after Concordia's first trip, a guide book by the historian professor J. A. Klein was published in Koblenz. It was titled Rheinreise von Mainz bis Cöln, Handbuch für Schnellreisende auf dem Rhein. A French translation appeared one year later. The guide book became the first Baedeker in 1835. It contained two pictures of Concordia.

== Service with NSM ==
In August 1840 Concordia was still active for the PRDG. In that month her conducteur fell over board, and drowned. PRDG then sold Concordia to NSM somewhat later.

On 2 February 1841 Concordia of the NSM arrived in Zierikzee. On 20 February 1841 Concordia towed the barque Marie Julie from her construction yard in Zierikzee into the open sea. On 29 March 1841 King William II visited Rotterdam. For the occasion the vessels in port were illuminated. one of these was Concordia of the NSM. The king would visit Fijenoord on 30 March.

The NSM would employ Concordia in her service between Rotterdam and Antwerp. On a July 1841 trip from Antwerp to Rotterdam Concordia under captain Engels, picked up a man and young child at Tholen. This man tried to commit suicided by jumping into the sea, but the boat picked him up again. Also in July 1841, Concordia's speed between Rotterdam and Antwerp was compared to a competing boat. In March 1843 Concordia transported the body of Anton Reinhard Falck from Antwerp to Rotterdam.

In 1844 NSM started to limit her shipping line activities. Concordia and Agrippina were then rented out to Mathias Stinnes. In 1845 Concordia was broken up.

== The Köln Düsseldorfer ==
The „Preußisch Rheinische Dampfschiffahrts-Gesellschaft“ (PRDG) would first take over the Dampfschiffahrts-Gesellschaft von Rhein und Main (DGRM). In 1853, it entered a partnership with the Dampfschiffahrts-Gesellschaft für den Nieder- und Mittelrhein (DGNM). This partnership would later become the Köln-Düsseldorfer shipping line. This is still the main shipping line for tourism on the Rhine.
