= Stationary steam engine =

Fixed steam engine for pumping or power generation

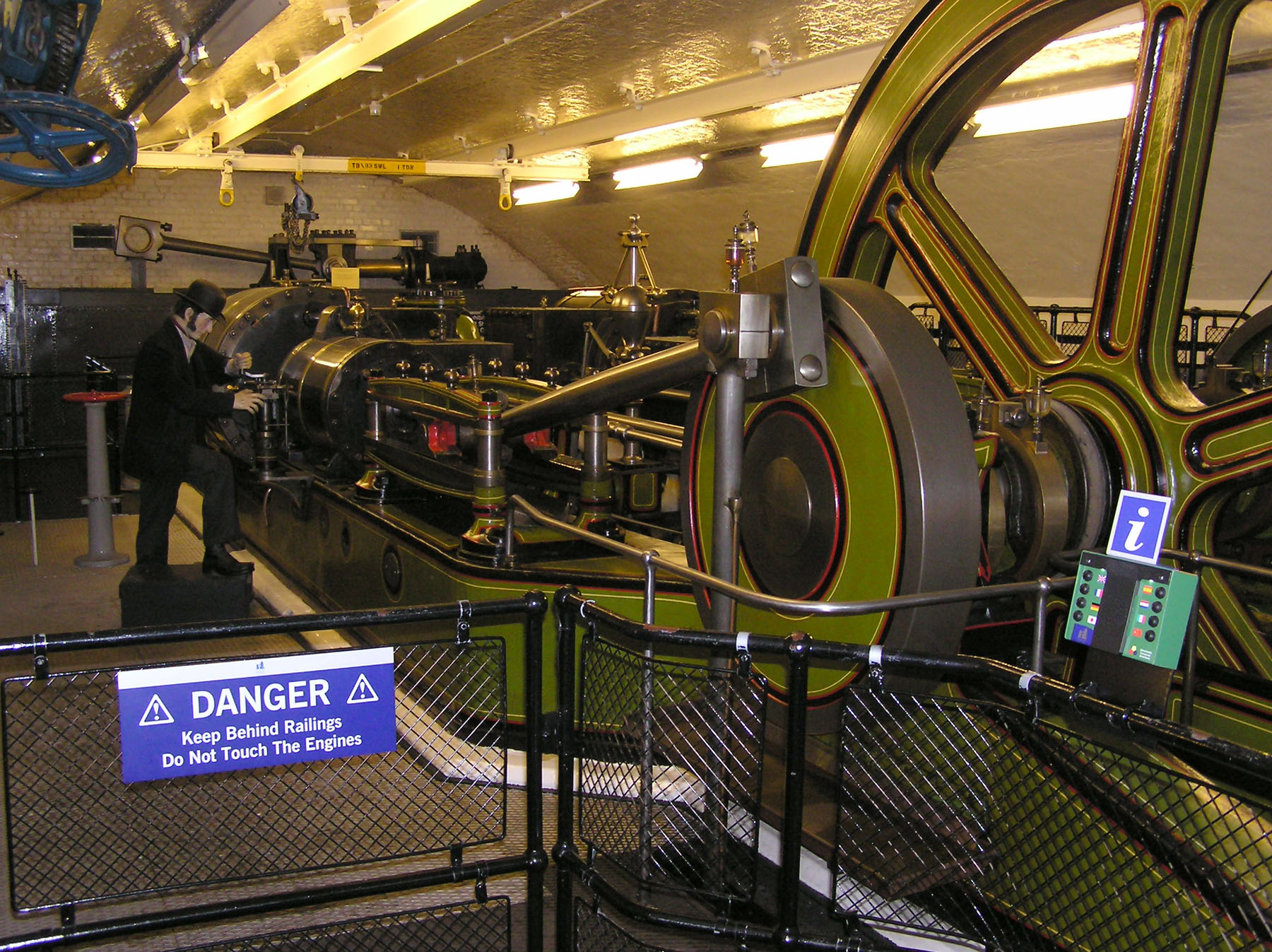
A stationary steam engine, preserved at Tower Bridge in London. This is one of two tandem cross-compound hydraulic pumping engines formerly used to raise and lower the bridge.

Stationary steam engines are fixed steam engines used for pumping or driving mills and factories, and for power generation. They are distinct from locomotive engines used on railways, traction engines for heavy steam haulage on roads, steam cars (and other motor vehicles), agricultural engines used for ploughing or threshing, marine engines, and the steam turbines used as the mechanism of power generation for most nuclear power plants.

The development of the steam engine was gradual. They were introduced during the 18th century and widely made for the whole of the 19th century and most of the first half of the 20th century, only declining as electricity supply and the internal combustion engine became more widespread. Over time, they would improve in pressure, expansion and speed.

== Development of the stationary steam engine ==
In the first century AD, Hero of Alexandria described the aeolipile, a simple turbine engine powered by steam. Until the 16th and 17th century, there were no other notable steam-powered engines. In the 18th century, James Watt improved on the designs of Thomas Newcomen to create the first "modern" steam engine. It included all major aspects of a standard steam engine: leveraging the expansion of steam, using a separate condenser, and regulating speed with a governor.

The first steam engines operated very slowly. The greatest improvement was the increased pressure at which they could operate. Super heaters were added to boilers to increase temperature and the economy of the engine. The first engines utilized a single cylinder where low pressure steam was introduced to the bottom of the piston and then condensed. More cylinders were added creating the compound steam engine. As pressure increased, it was found that the compound design was more economical.

== Components of a stationary steam engine ==
- The number of cylinders and valves determine the type of engine. The area of the cylinder along with the speed of the piston and the pressure of the steam determines the power output. Valves are used for exhaust and drainage of steam.
- Pistons are the surface of which the pressure from the steam is applied inside the barrel of the cylinder. To achieve the build up of pressure, the pistons must be sealed to the cylinder walls. This is done using piston rings.
- The connecting rod is responsible for transferring the load of the piston to the crank pin or crank shaft and is subject to tension and compression.

== Types of stationary steam engine ==
Double-acting horizontal stationary steam engine. The piston is on the left, the crank is mounted on the flywheel axle on the right.

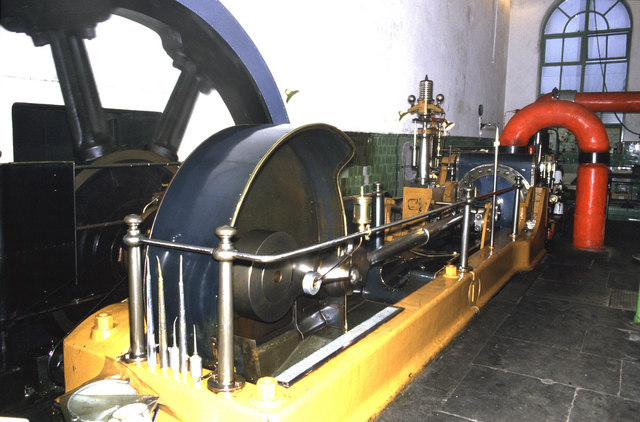
Mill engine, Queen Street Mill, Burnley. William Roberts horizontal tandem compound engine - 'Peace'.

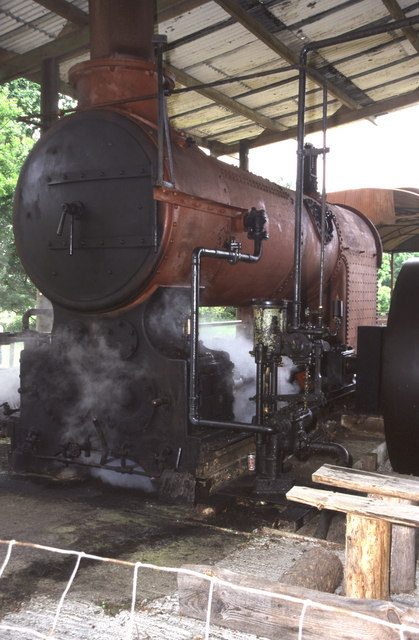
Marshall undertype steam engine

There are different patterns of stationary steam engines, distinguished by the layout of the cylinders and crankshaft:

- Beam engines have a rocking beam providing the connection between the vertical cylinder and crankshaft.
- Table engines have the crosshead above the vertical cylinder and the crankshaft below.
- Horizontal engines have a horizontal cylinder.
- Vertical engines have a vertical cylinder.
- Inclined engines have an inclined cylinder.
- Undertype engines are distinguished by having a locomotive-style boiler over top of a horizontal engine.

Stationary engines may be classified by secondary characteristics as well:

- High-speed engines are distinguished by fast-acting valves.
- Corliss engines are distinguished by special rotary valve gear.
- Uniflow engines have admission valves at the cylinder heads and exhaust ports at the midpoint.

When stationary engines had multiple cylinders, they could be classified as:

- Simple engines, with multiple identical cylinders operating on a common crankshaft.
- Compound engines which use the exhaust from high-pressure cylinders to power low-pressure cylinders.

An engine could be run in simple or condensing mode:

- Simple mode meant the exhaust gas left the cylinder and passed straight into the atmosphere
- In condensing mode, the steam was cooled in a separate cylinder, and changed from vapour to liquid water, creating a vacuum that assisted with the motion. This could be done with a water-cooled plate that acted as a heat sink, or pumping-in a spray of water.

Stationary engines may also be classified by their application:

- Pumping engines are found in pumping stations.
- Mill engines to power textile mills
- Winding engines power various types of hoists.
- Refrigeration engines are typically coupled to ammonia compressors.

Stationary engines could be classified by the manufacturer

- Boulton & Watt
- George Saxon & Co

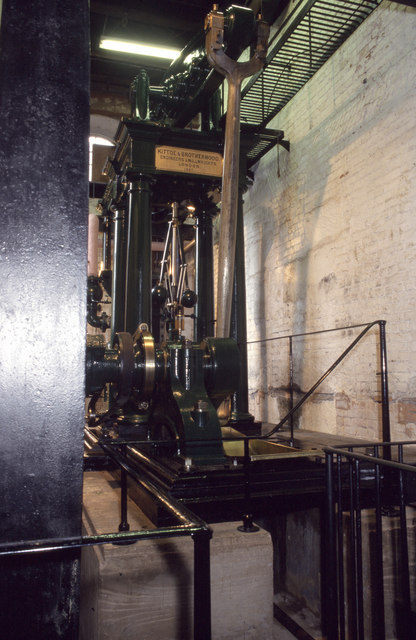
The restored Kittoe and Brotherhood beam engine at Coldharbour, which is steamed up regularly on Bank Holiday weekends.

== History ==
In order of evolution:

- Savery atmospheric engine (1700)
- Newcomen engine (1712)
- Watt engine (1775)
- Hornblower (1781)
- Trevithick (1799)
- Woolf (1804)
- Cornish engine (1812)
- McNaught'ed compound beam engines (1845)
- Corliss engine(1859)
- Porter-Allen engine (1862)
- Uniflow engine Todd's (1885)
- Steam turbine (1889)

== See also ==
- Boilers
- Centrifugal governor
- Lineshaft
- Belt
- List of steam energy topics
- Live steam
- Steam fair
- Stationary engine
- Steam donkey
- Preserved stationary steam engines

== Bibliography ==
- Buchanan, R. A., and Watkins, George, The Industrial Archaeology of the Stationary Steam Engine, London, 1976, ISBN 0-7139-0604-9
- Fowler, W. H. (1919). Stationary steam engines, illustrated with numerous examples from actual practice / Ed. by William H. Fowler. The Scientific publishing company, [1907].
- Bowditch, J. (1992). Power from Steam: A History of the Stationary Steam Engine by Richard L. Hills (review). Technology and Culture, 33(4), 821–823. https://doi.org/10.1353/tech.1992.0025
- Hills, Richard Leslie (1993). Power from Steam: A History of the Stationary Steam Engine (paperback ed.). Cambridge University Press. p. 244. ISBN 9780521458344.
- Roberts, A S (1921). Arthur Robert's Engine List. One guy from Barlick-Book Transcription. Archived from the original on 2011-07-23.
- Watkins, George, Stationary Steam Engines of Great Britain, Landmark Publishing, various ISBNs

Vol 1, Yorkshire (2000)
Vol 2, Scotland and Northern England (2000)
Vols 3:1, 3:2, Lancashire (2001)
Vol 4, Wales, Cheshire,& Shropshire (2002)
Vol 5, The North Midlands (2002)
Vol 6, The South Midlands (2003)
Vol 7, The South and South West (2003)
Vol 8, Greater London and the South East (2003)
Vol 9, East Anglia & adjacent counties (2004)
Vol 10, Marine Engines (and readers' notes, indexes to the series etc) (2005)

This series reproduces some 1,500 images from the Steam Engine Record made by George Watkins between 1930 and 1980, which is now in the Watkins Collection at English Heritage's National Monuments Record at Swindon, Wilts.
