= Compound steam engine =

Steam engine where steam is expanded in stages

Double-acting triple-expansion marine engine High-pressure steam (red) passes through three stages, exhausting as low-pressure steam (blue) to the condenser

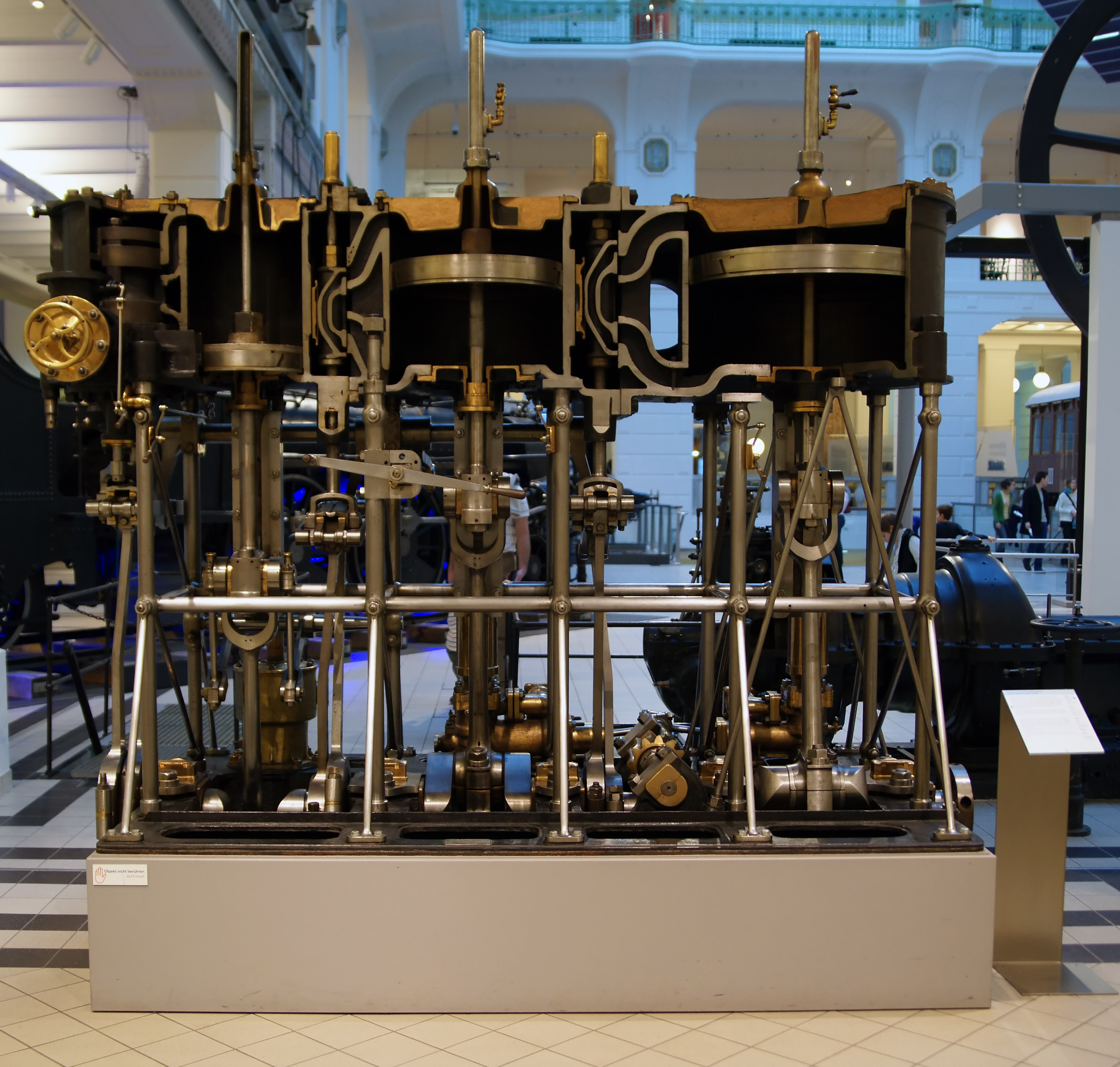
Cutaway of triple expansion compound steam engine, 1888

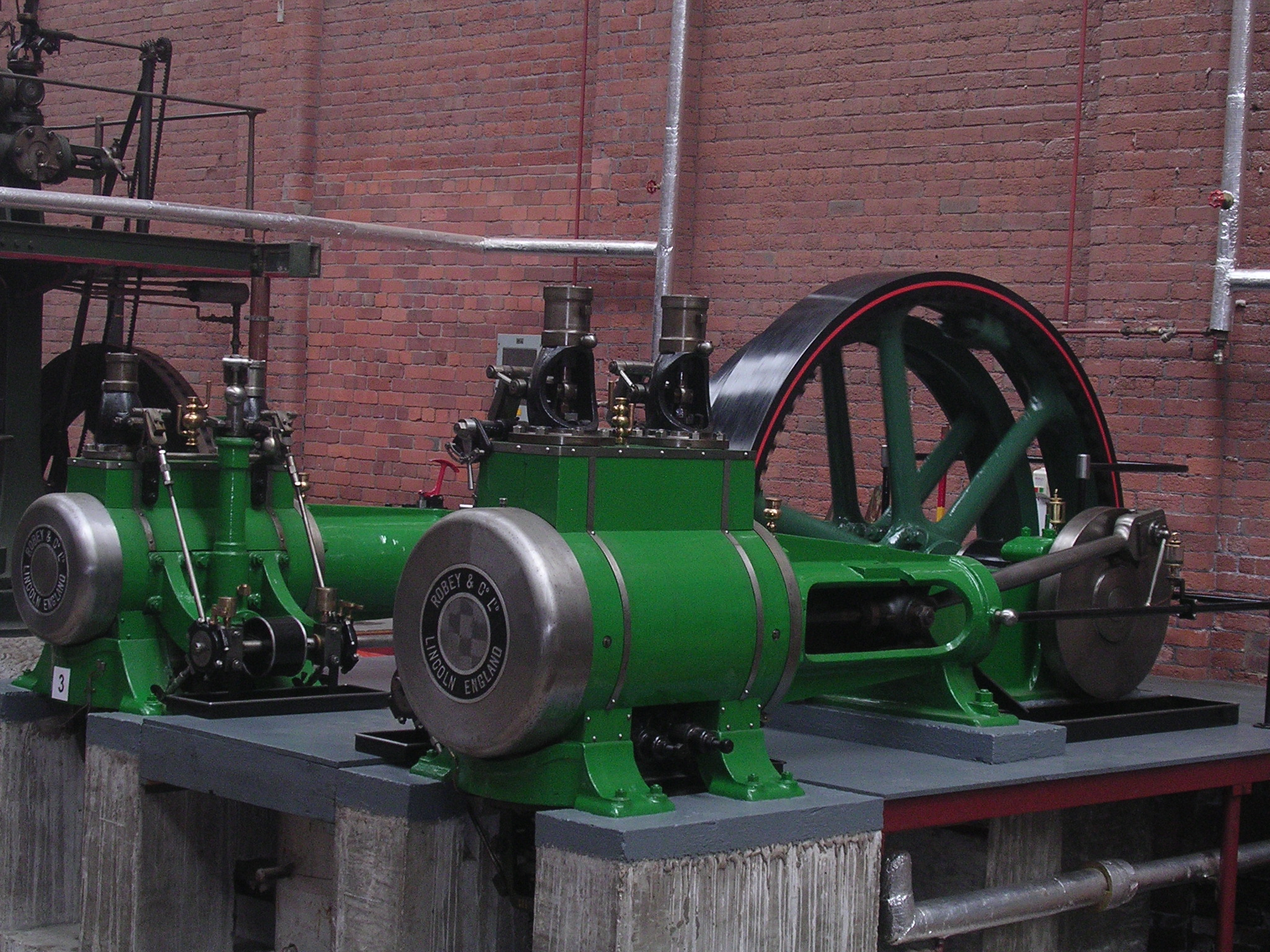
Robey horizontal cross-compound steam engine: small high-pressure cylinder (left) and large low-pressure cylinder (right)

A compound steam engine unit is a type of steam engine where steam is expanded in two or more stages. A typical arrangement for a compound engine is that the steam is first expanded in a high-pressure (HP) cylinder, then having given up heat and losing pressure, it exhausts directly into one or more larger-volume low-pressure (LP) cylinders. Multiple-expansion engines employ additional cylinders, of progressively lower pressure, to extract further energy from the steam.

Invented in 1781, this technique was first employed on a Cornish beam engine in 1804. Around 1850, compound engines were introduced into Lancashire textile mills.

== Compound systems ==
There are many compound systems and configurations, but there are two basic types, according to how HP and LP piston strokes are phased and hence whether the HP exhaust is able to pass directly from HP to LP (Woolf compounds) or whether pressure fluctuation necessitates an intermediate "buffer" space in the form of a steam chest or pipe known as a receiver (receiver compounds).

In a single-expansion (or 'simple') steam engine, the high-pressure steam enters the cylinder at boiler pressure through an inlet valve. The steam pressure forces the piston down the cylinder, until the valve shuts (e.g. after 25% of the piston's stroke). After the steam supply is cut off the trapped steam continues to expand, pushing the piston to the end of its stroke, where the exhaust valve opens and expels the partially depleted steam to the atmosphere, or to a condenser. This "cut-off" allows much more work to be extracted, since the expansion of the steam is doing additional work beyond that done by the steam at boiler pressure.

An earlier cut-off increases the expansion ratio, which in principle allows more energy to be extracted and increases efficiency. Ideally, the steam would expand adiabatically, and the temperature would drop corresponding to the volume increase. However, in practice the material of the surrounding cylinder acts as a heat reservoir, cooling the steam in the earlier part of the expansion and heating it in the later part. These irreversible heat flows decrease the efficiency of the process, so that, beyond a certain point, further increasing the expansion ratio would actually decrease efficiency, in addition to decreasing the mean effective pressure and thus the power of the engine.

=== Compounding engines ===
A solution to the dilemma was invented in 1804 by British engineer Arthur Woolf, who patented his Woolf high pressure compound engine in 1805. In the compound engine, high-pressure steam from the boiler first expands in a high-pressure (HP) cylinder and then enters one or more subsequent lower pressure (LP) cylinders. The complete expansion of the steam occurs across multiple cylinders and, as there is less expansion in each cylinder, the steam cools less in each cylinder, making higher expansion ratios practical and increasing the efficiency of the engine.

There are other advantages: as the temperature range is smaller, cylinder condensation is reduced. Loss due to condensation is restricted to the LP cylinder. Pressure difference is less in each cylinder so there is less steam leakage at the piston and valves. The turning moment is more uniform, so balancing is easier and a smaller flywheel may be used. Only the smaller HP cylinder needs to be built to withstand the highest pressure, which reduces the overall weight. Similarly, components are subject to less strain, so they can be lighter. The reciprocating parts of the engine are lighter, reducing the engine vibrations. The compound could be started at any point in the cycle, and in the event of mechanical failure the compound could be reset to act as a simple, and thus keep running.

To derive equal work from lower-pressure steam requires a larger cylinder volume as this steam occupies a greater volume. Therefore, the bore, and in rare cases the stroke as well, are increased in low-pressure cylinders, resulting in larger cylinders.

Double-expansion (usually just known as 'compound') engines expand the steam in two stages, but this does not imply that all such engines have two cylinders. They may have four cylinders working as two LP–HP pairs, or the work of the large LP cylinder can be split across two smaller cylinders, with one HP cylinder exhausting into either LP cylinder, giving a three-cylinder layout where the cylinder and piston diameter of all three are about the same, making the reciprocating masses easier to balance.

Two-cylinder compounds can be arranged as:

- Cross-compound – the cylinders are side by side
- Tandem compound – the cylinders are end to end, driving a common connecting rod
- Telescopic-compound – the cylinders are one inside the other
- Angle-compound – the cylinders are arranged in a vee (usually at a 90° angle) and drive a common crank.

The adoption of compounding was widespread for stationary industrial units where the need was for increased power at decreasing cost, and almost universal for marine engines after 1880. It was not widely used in railway locomotives where it was often perceived as complicated and unsuitable for the harsh railway operating environment and limited space afforded by the loading gauge (particularly in Britain). Compounding was never common on British railways and not employed at all after 1930, but was used in a limited way in many other countries.

The first successful attempt to fly a heavier-than-air fixed-wing aircraft solely on steam power occurred in 1933, when George and William Besler converted a Travel Air 2000 biplane to fly on a 150 hp angle-compound V-twin steam engine of their own design instead of the usual Curtiss OX-5 inline or radial aviation gasoline engine it would have normally used.

=== Multiple-expansion engines ===
Double-acting triple-expansion marine engine. High-pressure steam (red) passes through three stages, exhausting as low-pressure steam (blue) to the condenser

It is a logical extension of the compound engine (described above) to split the expansion into yet more stages to increase efficiency. The result is the multiple-expansion engine. Such engines use either three or four expansion stages and are known as triple- and quadruple-expansion engines respectively. These engines use a series of double-acting cylinders of progressively increasing diameter and/or stroke and hence volume. These cylinders are designed to divide the work into three or four equal portions, one for each expansion stage. The adjacent image shows an animation of a triple-expansion engine. The steam travels through the engine from left to right. The valve chest for each of the cylinders is to the left of the corresponding cylinder.

== History ==
=== Early work ===
- 1781 – Jonathan Hornblower, the grandson of one of Newcomen's engine erectors in Cornwall, patented a double-cylinder compound reciprocating beam engine in 1781. When he sought an extension of the patent from Parliament in 1792, the firm of Boulton & Watt opposed it, claiming infringement of James Watt's own patent, and Hornblower was eventually forced to withdraw his request. The compound principle was then forgotten until Arthur Woolf rediscovered it in 1804.
- 1797 – Richard Trevithick develops an effective high pressure steam engine.
- 1804 – Arthur Woolf patents the Woolf high-pressure compound engine in 1804 and 1805. After Watt's patent expired, Woolf revived and improved Hornblower's compound engine in 1810; its thermal efficiency of 7.5 percent was almost twice that of Watt's engine. He returned to Cornwall in 1812 to introduce it for pumping mines, and it was widely used until it was superseded in the following decade by Trevithick's engine.

=== Double-expansion ===
- 1833 – The steam paddle tugboat Hercules (1829) was modified to use an extra low pressure cylinder, taken from the steamboat Agrippina, with steam from her high-pressure cylinders. This modification was designed by Dutch engineer Gerhard Moritz Roentgen, making him the inventor of the naval compound steam engine. Hercules was then successfully used for service on the river Waal, becoming the first ship with a compound steam engine to enter service.
- 1845 – William McNaught devised a method of fixing an additional high-pressure cylinder within an existing beam engine. To do so involved using a long pipe to connect the cylinders, and an extra set of valves to balance them. In effect this acted as a receiving chest, and a new type of compound had been invented. This system allowed greater control of the steam intake and cut-offs. An engine could be slowed by either a throttle which reduced the pressure of the steam, or by adjusting the cut-off on either cylinder. The latter was more efficient as no power was lost. The cycle was smoother as the two cylinders were not in phase.
- 1865 – SS Agamemnon (1865) was launched, equipped with a 300hp compound steam engine. The engine was designed by Alfred Holt, one of her owners. Holt had persuaded the Board of Trade to allow a boiler pressure of 60psi instead of the normal 25psi – a higher pressure was needed to realise the advantages of double-expansion. The efficiency obtained enabled this ship to travel 8,500 miles before coaling. This made her competitive on routes between China and Britain.

=== Multiple-expansion ===
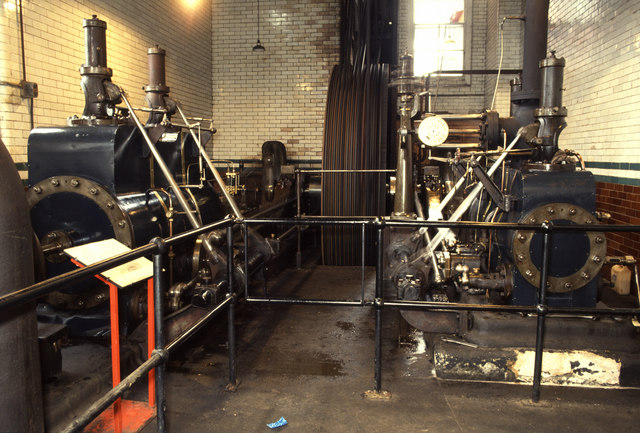
The Coldharbour Mill Pollit and Wigzell cross-compound engine, which drives the rope race seen in the background, transmitting power to line shafts on all five levels of the mill

- 1861 – Daniel Adamson took out a patent for a multiple-expansion engine, with three or more cylinders connected to one beam or crankshaft. He built a triple-expansion engine for Victoria Mills, Dukinfield which opened in 1867.
- 1871 – Charles Normand, of Le Havre fitted a triple-expansion engine to a Seine river boat in 1871.
- 1872 – Sir Fredrick J. Bramwell reported that compound marine engines, operating at 45psi to 60psi, consumed 2 lbs to 2.5 lbs of coal per hour per indicated horsepower.
- 1881 – Alexander Carnegie Kirk built SS Aberdeen, the first major ship to be successfully powered by a triple expansion engine. The success relied on solving the problem of designing a boiler that could operate at the (then) high pressures needed to realise the benefits of triple expansion.
- 1887 – HMS Victoria launched, the first battleship to be powered by triple expansion engines.
- 1891 – Triple expansion compound marine engines, operating at 160psi, consumed on average about 1.5 lbs of coal per hour per indicated horsepower.

== Applications ==
=== Mill engines ===
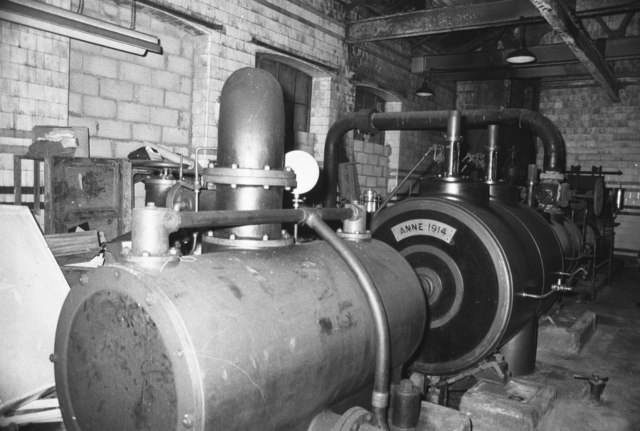
A Marchent & Morley horizontal tandem compound engine built 1914, at Craven Mills, Cole. The air pump and jet condenser are nearest with the LP cylinder beyond. It is fitted with Morley's patent piston drop valves

Though the first mills were driven by water power, once steam engines were adopted the manufacturer no longer needed to site the mills by running water. Cotton spinning required ever larger mills to fulfil the demand, and this drove the owners to demand increasingly powerful engines. When boiler pressure had exceeded 60 psi, compound engines achieved a thermo-dynamic advantage, but it was the mechanical advantages of the smoother stroke that was the deciding factor in the adoption of compounds. In 1859, there was 75,886 ihp (indicated horsepower) of engines in mills in the Manchester area, of which 32,282 ihp was provided by compounds though only 41,189 ihp was generated from boilers operated at over 60psi.

To generalise, between 1860 and 1926 all Lancashire mills were driven by compounds. The last compound built was by Buckley and Taylor for Wye No.2 mill, Shaw. This engine was a cross-compound design to 2,500 ihp, driving a 24 ft, 90 ton flywheel, and operated until 1965.

=== Marine applications ===
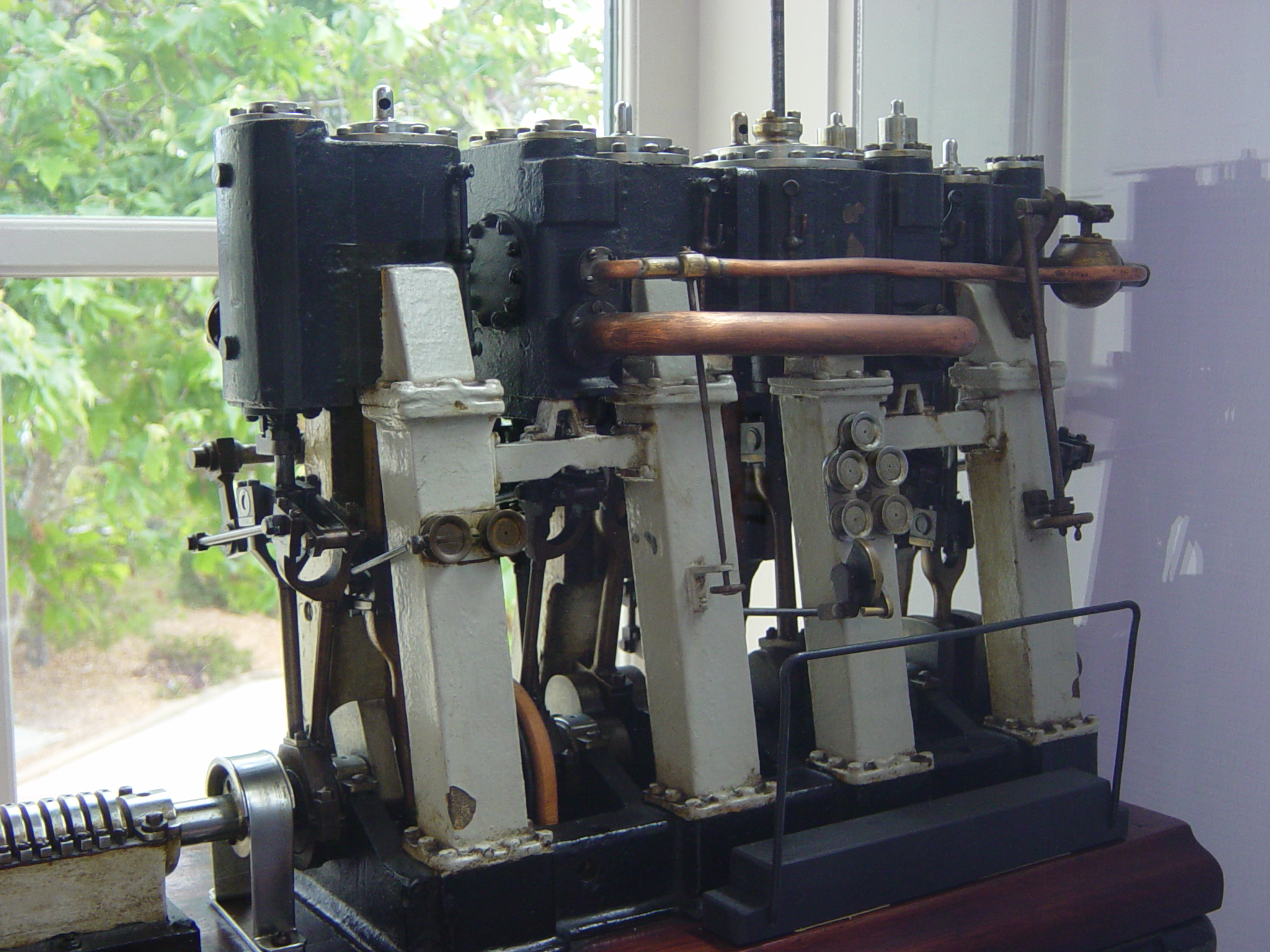
Model of a triple-expansion engine

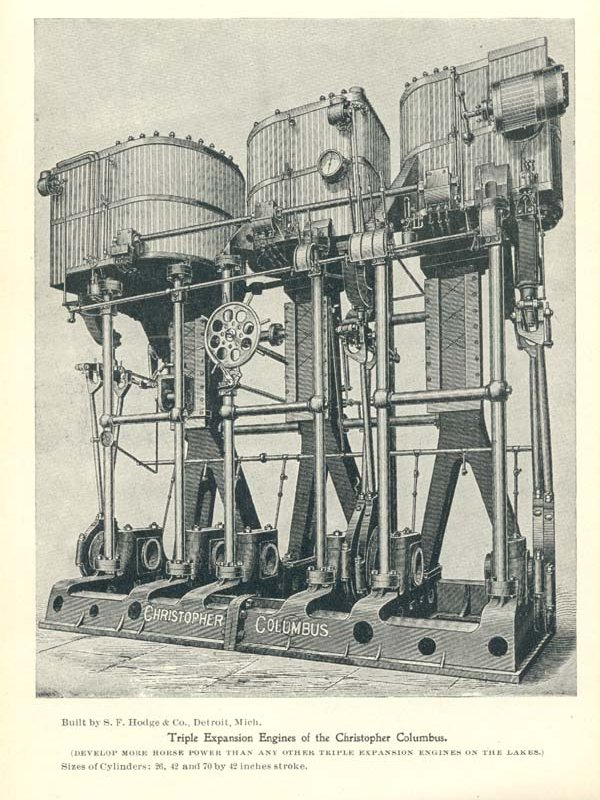
1890s triple-expansion (three cylinders of 26, 42 and 70 inch diameters in a common frame with a 42-inch stroke) marine engine that powered the SS Christopher Columbus.

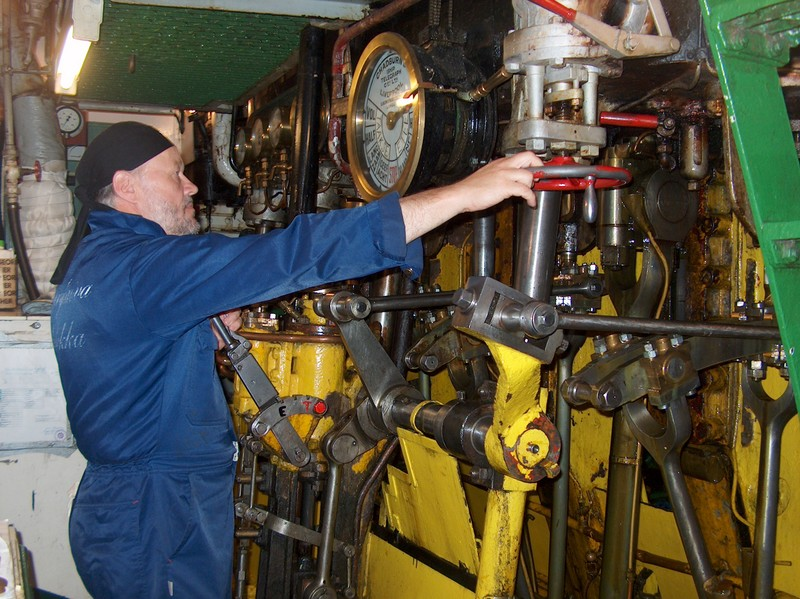
SS Ukkopekka triple-expansion marine engine

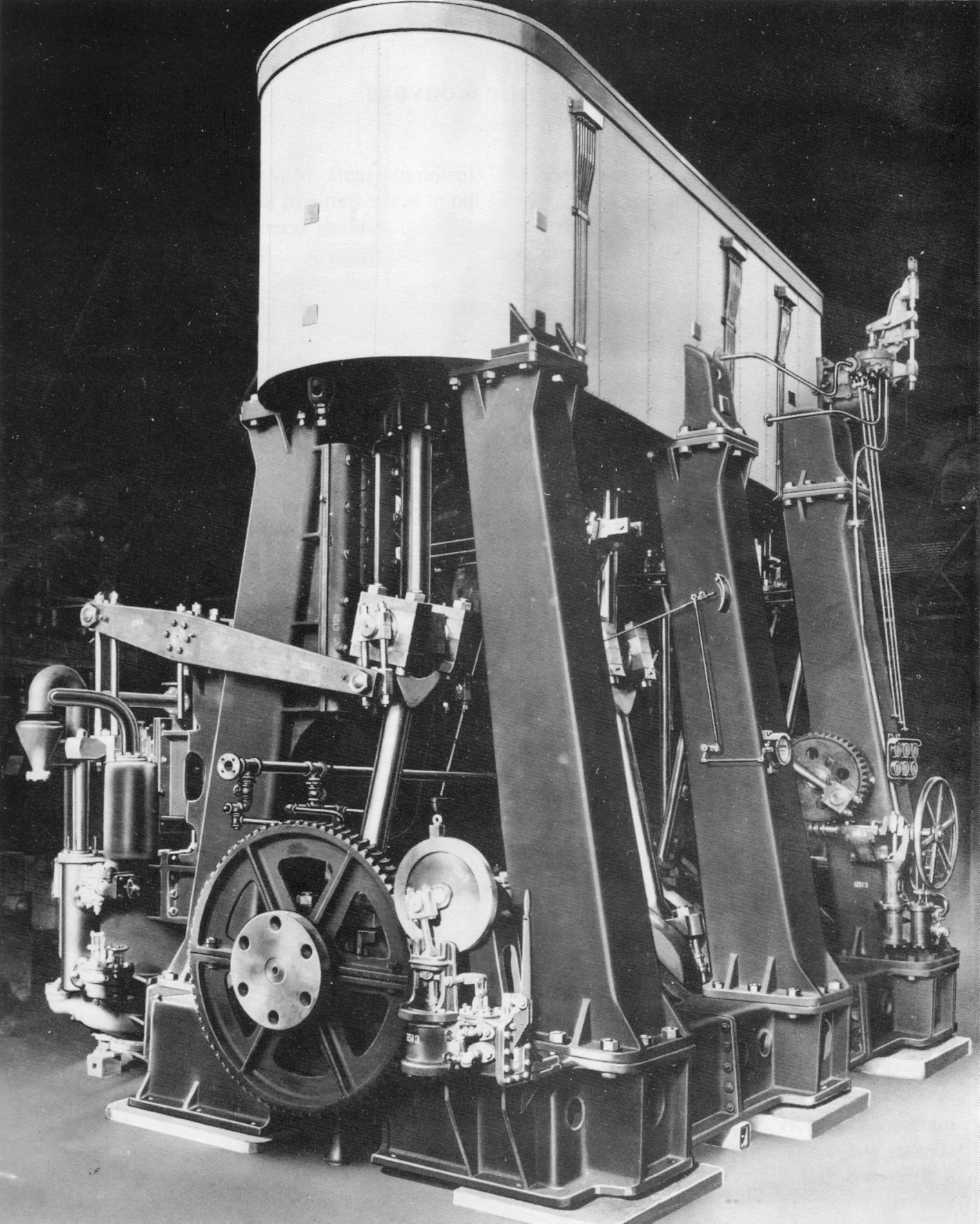
140-ton – also described as 135-ton – vertical triple expansion steam engine of the type used to power World War II Liberty ships, assembled for testing prior to delivery. The engine is 21 feet (6.4 meters) long and 19 feet (5.8 meters) tall and was designed to operate at 76 rpm and propel a Liberty ship at about 11 knots (13 mph; 20 km/h).

In the marine environment, the general requirement was for autonomy and increased operating range, as ships had to carry their coal supplies. The old salt-water boiler was thus no longer adequate and had to be replaced by a closed fresh-water circuit with condenser. The result from 1880 onwards was the multiple-expansion engine using three or four expansion stages (triple- and quadruple-expansion engines). These engines used a series of double-acting cylinders of progressively increasing diameter and/or stroke (and hence volume) designed to divide the work into three or four, as appropriate, equal portions for each expansion stage. Where space is at a premium, two smaller cylinders of a large sum volume might be used for the low-pressure stage. Multiple-expansion engines typically had the cylinders arranged in-line, but various other formations were used. In the late 19th century, the Yarrow–Schlick–Tweedy balancing 'system' was used on some marine triple-expansion engines. Y–S–T engines divided the low-pressure expansion stages between two cylinders, one at each end of the engine. This allowed the crankshaft to be better balanced, resulting in a smoother, faster-responding engine which ran with less vibration. This made the 4-cylinder triple-expansion engine popular with large passenger liners (such as the Olympic class), but was ultimately replaced by the virtually vibration-free steam turbine.

In 1853, the Glasgow engineer John Elder patented the compound marine engine, and compound engines dominated the top end of the marine market until the mid-1880s. The triple-expansion engine, which offered further economy, was then put on a commercial footing by Alexander Kirk, and it remained the industry standard for reciprocating-engined ships until long after 1914. Kirk had demonstrated the principle on the SS Propontis in 1874; the triple-expansion engine reduced coal consumption in marine engines by 25 percent and rapidly superseded the compound engine.

The development of this type of engine was important for its use in steamships as by exhausting to a condenser the water could be reclaimed to feed the boiler, which was unable to use seawater. Land-based steam engines could simply exhaust much of their steam, as feed water was usually readily available. Prior to and during World War II, the expansion engine dominated marine applications where high vessel speed was not essential. It was superseded by the steam turbine when speed was required, such as for warships and ocean liners. HMS Dreadnought of 1905 was the first major warship to replace the proven technology of the reciprocating engine with the then-novel steam turbine.

=== Application to railway locomotives ===
For railway locomotive applications the main benefit sought from compounding was economy in fuel and water consumption plus high power/weight ratio due to temperature and pressure drop taking place over a longer cycle, this resulting in increased efficiency; additional perceived advantages included more even torque.

While designs for compound locomotives may date as far back as James Samuel's 1856 patent for a "continuous expansion locomotive", the practical history of railway compounding begins with Anatole Mallet's designs in the 1870s. Mallet locomotives were operated in the United States up to the end of mainline steam by the Norfolk and Western Railway. The designs of Alfred George de Glehn in France also saw significant use, especially in the rebuilds of André Chapelon. A wide variety of compound designs were tried around 1900, but most were short-lived in popularity, due to their complexity and maintenance liability. In the 20th century the superheater was widely adopted, and the vast majority of steam locomotives were simple-expansion (with some compound locomotives converted to simple). It was realised by engineers that locomotives at steady speed were worked most efficiently with a wide-open regulator and early cut-off, the latter being set via the reversing gear. A locomotive operating at very early cut-off of steam (e.g. at 15% of the piston stroke) allows maximum expansion of the steam, with less wasted energy at the end of the stroke. Superheating eliminates the condensation and rapid loss of pressure that would otherwise occur with such expansion.

Large American locomotives used two cross-compound steam-driven air compressors, e.g. the Westinghouse 8 1/2" 150-D, for the train brakes.

== The Yarrow–Schlick–Tweedy system ==
The presentation follows Sommerfeld's textbook, which contains a diagram (Figure 17) that is not reproduced for copyright reasons.

Consider a four-cylinder engine on a ship. Let x be the vertical direction, z be the fore–aft direction, and y be the port–starboard direction. Let the four cylinders be mounted in a row along the z axis, so that their pistons are pointed downwards. The pistons are connected to the same crankshaft via long vertical rods. Now, we set up the fundamental quantities of the engine:

- Let $M_1, M_2, M_3, M_4$ be the effective masses of the compounded piston-rod system of each cylinder.
- Let cylinder 2 to be separated from cylinder 1 with a distance of $a_2$ along the z axis, and similarly for $a_3, a_4$.
- Let $l_1, l_2, l_3, l_4$ be the length of each rod of the cylinder.
- Let $r_1, r_2, r_3, r_4$ be the radii of the crankshaft connector of each cylinder.
- Let $\phi_1, \phi_2, \phi_3, \phi_4$ be the angle of the crankshaft connector of each cylinder.
- Since the crankshaft is turned in tandem by all cylinders, $\phi_i - \phi_1$ is a constant $\alpha_i$ for each of $i = 2, 3, 4$.

Now, as the engine operates, the vertical position of cylinder $i$ is equal to $x_i$. By trigonometry, we have

$$x_i =r_i \cos\phi_i + \sqrt{l_i^2(r_i\sin\phi_i)^2} = l_1 + r_i\cos\phi_i - \frac{r_i^2}{l_i} (1-\cos(2\phi_i))/2 + O(r_i^3/l^2)$$

As each cylinder moves up and down, it exerts a vertical force on its mounting frame equaling $M_i\ddot x_i$. The YST system aims to make sure that the total of all four forces cancels out as exactly as possible. Specifically, it aims to make sure that the total force (along the x axis) and the total torque (around the y axis) are both zero:

$$\sum_{i=1}^4 M_i \ddot x_i = 0; \quad \sum_{i=2}^4 M_i a_i\ddot x_i = 0$$

This can be achieved if

$$\sum_{i=1}^4 M_i x_i = Const; \quad \sum_{i=2}^4 M_i a_i x_i = Const$$

Now, plugging in the equations, we find that it means (up to second-order)

$$\sum_{i=1}^4 M_i (r_i \cos\phi_i - \frac{r_i^2}{2l_i} \cos(2\phi_i))= 0; \quad \sum_{i=2}^4 M_i a_i (r_i \cos\phi_i - \frac{r_i^2}{2l_i} \cos(2\phi_i)) = 0$$

Plugging in $\phi_i = \phi_1 + \alpha_i$, and expand the cosine functions, we see that with $\phi_1$ arbitrary, the factors of $\sin(\phi_1), \cos(\phi_1), \sin(2\phi_1), \cos(2\phi_1)$ must vanish separately. This gives us eight equations to solve, which is in general possible if there are at least eight variables of the system that we can vary.

Of the variables of the system, $M_i, r_i$ are fixed by the design of the cylinders. Also, the absolute values of $a_2, a_3, a_4$ do not matter, only their ratios matter. Together, this gives us nine variables to vary: $l_1, l_2, l_3, l_4, \frac{a_3} {a_2}, \frac{a_4}{a_2}, \alpha_2, \alpha_3, \alpha_4$.

The YST system requires at least four cylinders. With three cylinders, the same derivation gives us only six variables to vary, which is insufficient to solve all eight equations.

The YST system is used on ships such as the SS Kaiser Wilhelm der Grosse and SS Deutschland (1900).

== Notes ==
Cylinder phasing: With two-cylinder compounds used in railway work, the pistons are connected to the cranks as with a two-cylinder simple at 90° out-of-phase with each other (quartered).

When the double-expansion group is duplicated, producing a four-cylinder compound, the individual pistons within the group are usually balanced at 180°, the groups being set at 90° to each other. In one case (the first type of Vauclain compound), the pistons worked in the same phase driving a common crosshead and crank, again set at 90° as for a two-cylinder engine.

With the three-cylinder compound arrangement, the LP cranks were either set at 90° with the HP one at 135° to the other two, or in some cases all three cranks were set at 120°.

ihp: The power of a mill engine was originally measured in Nominal Horse Power, but this system understated the power of a compound McNaught system suitable for compounds, ihp or indicated horse power. As a rule of thumb ihp is 2.6 times nhp, in a compound engine.

== See also ==
- Compound turbine
- Willans engine

== Bibliography ==
- Hills, Richard L. (1989). Power from Steam. Cambridge University Press. p. 244. ISBN 0-521-45834-X.
- Semmens, P.W.B.; Goldfinch, A.J. (2000). How Steam Locomotives Really Work. Oxford: Oxford University Press. ISBN 978-0-19-856536-9.
- Van Riemsdijk, J.T. (1994). Compound Locomotives: An International Survey. Penryn: Atlantic Transport Publishers. ISBN 0-906899-61-3.
- Löhnis, Th. P. (1916), "De Maatschappij voor scheeps- en werktuigbouw Fijenoord te Rotterdam, voorheen de Nederlandsche Stoomboot Maatschappij", Tijdschrift voor economische geographie, pp. 133–156
