= Gerhard Moritz Roentgen =

Dutch shipwright

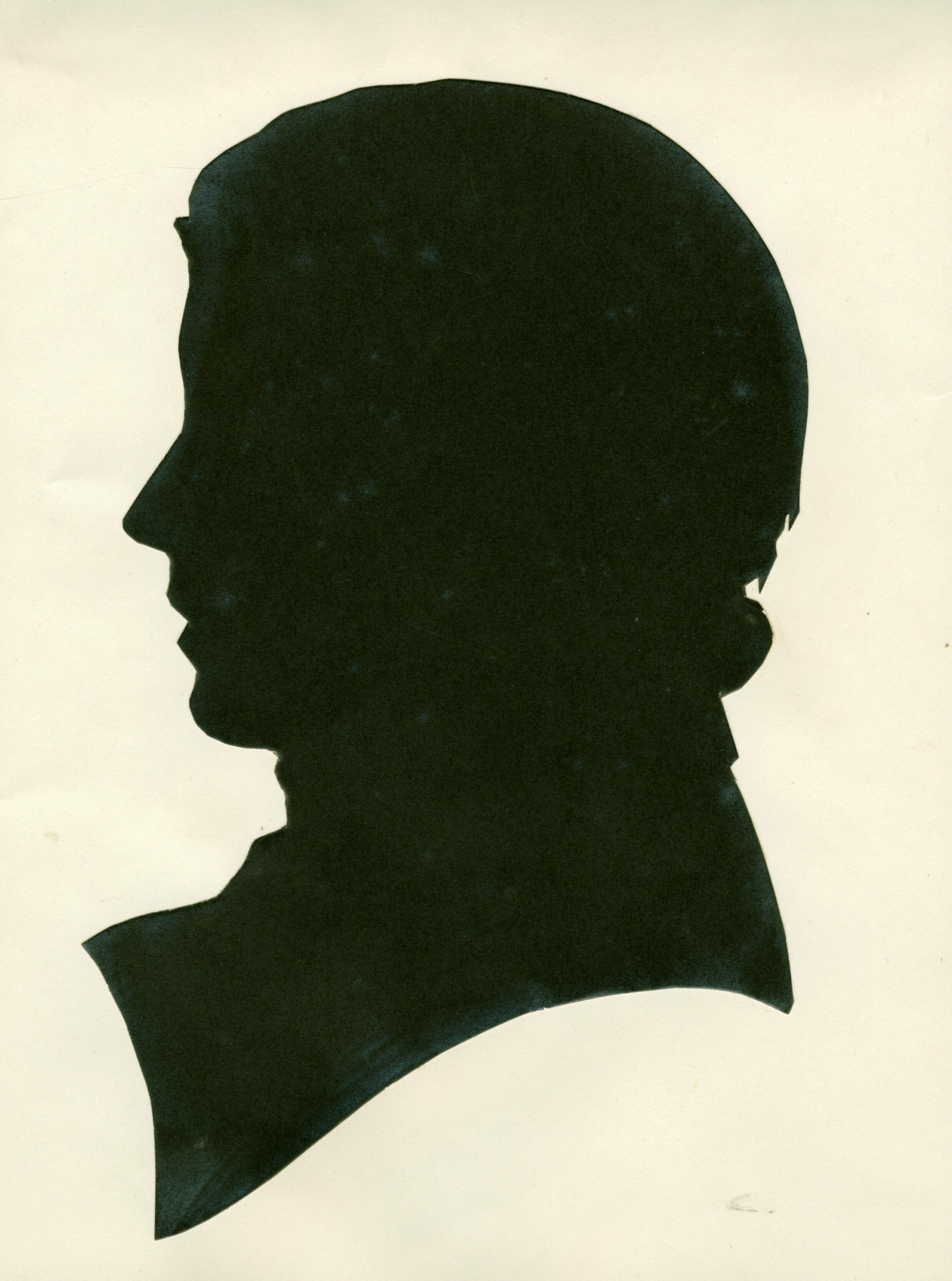
- Profile of Gerhard Moritz Roentgen
- Born: 7 May 1795; Esens, Ostfriesland
- Died: 28 October 1852 (aged 57); Santpoort, Netherlands
- Education: Naval Academy, Enkhuizen
- Occupations: Navy officer, engineer
- Spouse: Louise Bennet

Gerhard Moritz Roentgen (1795–1852) was a Dutch Navy officer, machine building engineer and ship builder. As of 1823 he was involved in founding the Nederlandsche Stoomboot Maatschappij (NSM). At first he was one of NSM two chief executives. Later on, he was the only executive till 1849. The invention of the marine compound steam engine is Roentgen's main scientific achievement.

== Early life ==
=== Youth and service in the navy ===
Gerhard Moritz Roentgen, known in the Netherlands as Gerhard Mauritz Roentgen, was the fourth son of Ludwig Roentgen and Sophia Margaretha Tischbein. Ludwig was a minister and the inspector of the orphanage and poor house in Esens, Ostfriesland. Ludwig's father descended from the artistic cabinet maker family Roentgen from Neuwied on the Rhine.

Till his 13th year, Roentgen lived in Esens, which had become part of the Kingdom of Holland by then. In 1808 he joined the Dutch naval academy Instituut voor de Marine in Enkhuizen, which he left as midshipman in 1810. Together with 30 other students, Roentgen was sent to Toulon by the French, where they should finish there education. When they applied to leave the French service in Spring 1814, the students were jailed in a fort near Toulon. Roengen escaped with two others, and arrived back in Holland in Summer.

In 1813 the Netherlands had been liberated. Roentgen then joined the re-established Dutch navy. In November 1814 he became a lieutenant 2nd class. In 1815 he sailed to the Dutch East Indies on board the ship of the line Brabant. The shoddy ex-French Brabant was forced to enter Portsmouth on 31 October 1815. Here she was docked and then sent back. Roentgen remained in England with orders to study shipbuilding there. In England Roentgen met the engineer John Fincham (1785–1859) and several others, just when the first steamboats were built there. In 1817 Roentgen became adjutant of the naval commander of Rotterdam.

In March 1818 Roentgen and the engineers C. Soetermeer and C.J. Glavimans got orders to make a more regular research trip to England. Roentgen remained in England till October 1820. He had a full permit from the British government to visit the navy shipyards, and to draw and model everything.

=== Marriage ===
In England Roentgen became acquainted with the very beautiful Georgina Louise Bennet (+1795–?). Without requesting the customary permission from the king, Roentgen married Georgina in 1821. He later apologized to the king for this unthoughtful act, and the king forgave him. However, his wife had to come to the Rotterdam Navy Command on 21 May 1821, and promise never to join her husband on a sea trip or on board ship.

=== Orders the Moerdijk ferry ===
In August 1821 Roentgen got net orders to go to London. He was to design and order ferry steamboat for the Moerdijk.

== Role in modernizing the Belgian iron industry ==
The Belgian iron industry had flourished during the French period, when British iron was banned from the continent. After the regained independence, it was getting obliterated by the British competition. The British product was so much better and cheaper, that the Netherlands could not do without it. Therefore, the government wanted to know why the Southern Netherlands iron industry could not achieve the same quality. The government lacked a true expert, and then gave Roentgen the far wider mission to also gather all possible information about the British iron mining, production, and processing.

Roentgen instructions held that he should primarily focus on how the British iron became so pure by removing other minerals like copper, zinc, arsenic and phosphorus. He furthermore had to study blast furnaces, the cupola furnace, rolling, and the use of coal in smelting iron. For some months Roentgen travelled in the English and Scottish industrial heartlands. In August 1822 he sent in his report. He noted that the British iron was so superior because it used Limonite as ore, instead of trying to purify other ores. The use of limonite was connected to using blast furnaces, and cokes or coal as fuel.

Roentgen then got to examine the iron industry in the Southern Netherlands. During his visit there, he met John Cockerill. In January 1823 Roentgen sent in another extensive report. This report explained the troubles of the Belgian iron industry: The blast furnaces were too small, and still fired with charcoal instead of coal; the puddle process was used in only one location; Bellows and hammers were underpowered because they still relied on watermills, which did not even work the whole year. Roentgen advised the government to support the foundation a blast furnace and iron foundry on the English model, see Cockerill.

The report made a lasting impression on his principals. With his ideas about steam propulsion Roentgen got the attention of King William I. When Roentgen wanted to leave the navy, he got an exceptionally honorable discharge as of 1 January 1824. He got a simultaneous appointment as adviser for machine building at the Department of education, industry and the colonies for 2,000 guilders a year.

== Roentgen's vision about the future of steam ==
Roentgen is known to have been a visionary technician. He expressed his vision in the Memorie over het nut, dat uit de toepassing van stoomwerktuigen op schepen van oorlog zou kunnen getrokken worden. (Memorandum about how steam engines could be put to good use on warships). He made this report after the king had sent him back to England to investigate the actual application of steam engines. Roentgen sent the report to his minister on 21 April 1824. The minister for industry forwarded it to the Minister for the navy, who on 16 June 1824 appointed a commission to judge the work.

As regards the steam engine, Roentgen noted that only about 25% of the energy from coal was put to use. He expected that engines would soon become more efficient by increased simplicity and the use of metal and copper next to iron. Roentgen also appreciated that high pressure steam engines would be far more effective, because they would save space and fuel. This would make it possible to efficiently steam across the oceans. He also saw possible improvements in the paddle wheel, but hoped that it could one day be replaced by a more effective means of propulsion.

For the hull of warships Roentgen predicted that warships would become much faster and bigger than anything yet afloat, but that this would happen only when wood had been replaced by iron. This would make ships lighter, and allow a longer narrower form that would increase speed. A truly radical thought by Roentgen was to armor the iron warship from a few feet below the waterline to a few feet above the waterline, and about the machines.

As regards artillery Roentgen suggested to use heavier guns, e.g. Paixhans guns. The artillery could be of the Paixhans system, but it would be even better to have e.g. a single 50 cm gun shooting a 500 kg bullet, or a 300 kg grenade. Such new warships would be able to stand up to the current ships of the line, and to destroy them one by one. Roentgen also foresaw the use of an iron Naval ram, but did not expect much from submarines and torpedoes.

Roentgen proposed made three specific projects:

- Building tugboats to tow warships on rivers, and out into sea, and even into the English Channel.
- Placing a steam engine in an existing warship (see: frigate Rijn)
- Building a new iron steam warship

The navy commission deemed most of Roentgen proposals to be too futuristic. Of his specific projects, the one to place a steam engine in an existing warship was executed in Vlissingen, but failed. The plan for the sea going tugboats and new iron warship led to further plans by engineer Soetermeer. In 1825 Roentgen got the Order of the Netherlands Lion for his work.

Roentgen was not the only man with these views. Previously, Robert Fulton (1765–1815) had designed the self-propelled battery ship Demologos. She was commissioned in 1816, was armored in wood, and was designed to also mount two 100-pounder Columbiads. In 1824, P.M. de Montgéry published his Mémoire sur les Navires en Fer. In this work he reiterated his earlier view that ships should be armored in iron.

== Invention of the compound steam engine ==
The invention of the marine compound steam engine is Roentgen's greatest scientific achievement. It came about by the construction of the steam tugboat Hercules. She had been ordered in 1825, but in 1828 Hercules was still not ready. Roentgen then decided to re-use the high-pressure steam engine of Agrippina (another failed project). During this transfer, two high-pressure cylinders were joined by a large single low pressure cylinder. The core of the invention was the use of a receiver, which enabled the re-use of steam without the cylinders expanding at the same time. This set Roentgen's machine apart from the earlier Woolf engine, which he had undoubtedly seen in Great Britain. It made that Roentgen's machine could effectively be used on vessels.

Roentgen's invention could not be used effectively for sea-going vessels, because it required fresh water to be injected in the condensers. In the end, Roentgen's invention had little lasting consequences, because of John Penn's elegant version of the oscillating cylinder steam engine. At the time this became a superior solution, also for inland shipping. Roentgen's machine was nevertheless patented in the United Kingdom in 1834 by his representative Ernst Wolff.

From 1854 the compound steam engine was successfully applied to ocean-going ships by John Elder, and came in general use. In about 1890 there was a debate about who had actually invented the compound steam engine. Mr. David Croll, Scotsman and Clyde engineer, and general manager of the Nederlandsche Stoomboot Maatschappij then sent design drawings of Hercules to the magazine The Engineer. An 1890 article in the magazine was clear: These old drawings, made between the years 1826 and 1840, prove beyond the shadow of a doubt that compound engines with 70 lb to 80 lb steam were working on the Rhine and Meuse so long back as sixty years ago, and also that many of what are generally supposed to be modern improvements, such as forced draught, hollow shafts, stepped floats, and balanced rudders, were practically applied only a few years later.

In a later issue M. Mallet showed many shortcomings in Roentgen's engine, but also concluded that: There is no longer any room for doubt that the invention of the compound engine with receiver, the use of which has in our time been so greatly extended, must be attributed to the Dutch constructor, Gerard Maurice Roentgen, who has not only described in his patent specifications, ... , the essential arrangement of this engine, but has also made numerous applications of it.

== In business ==
=== Foundation of a shipping line ===
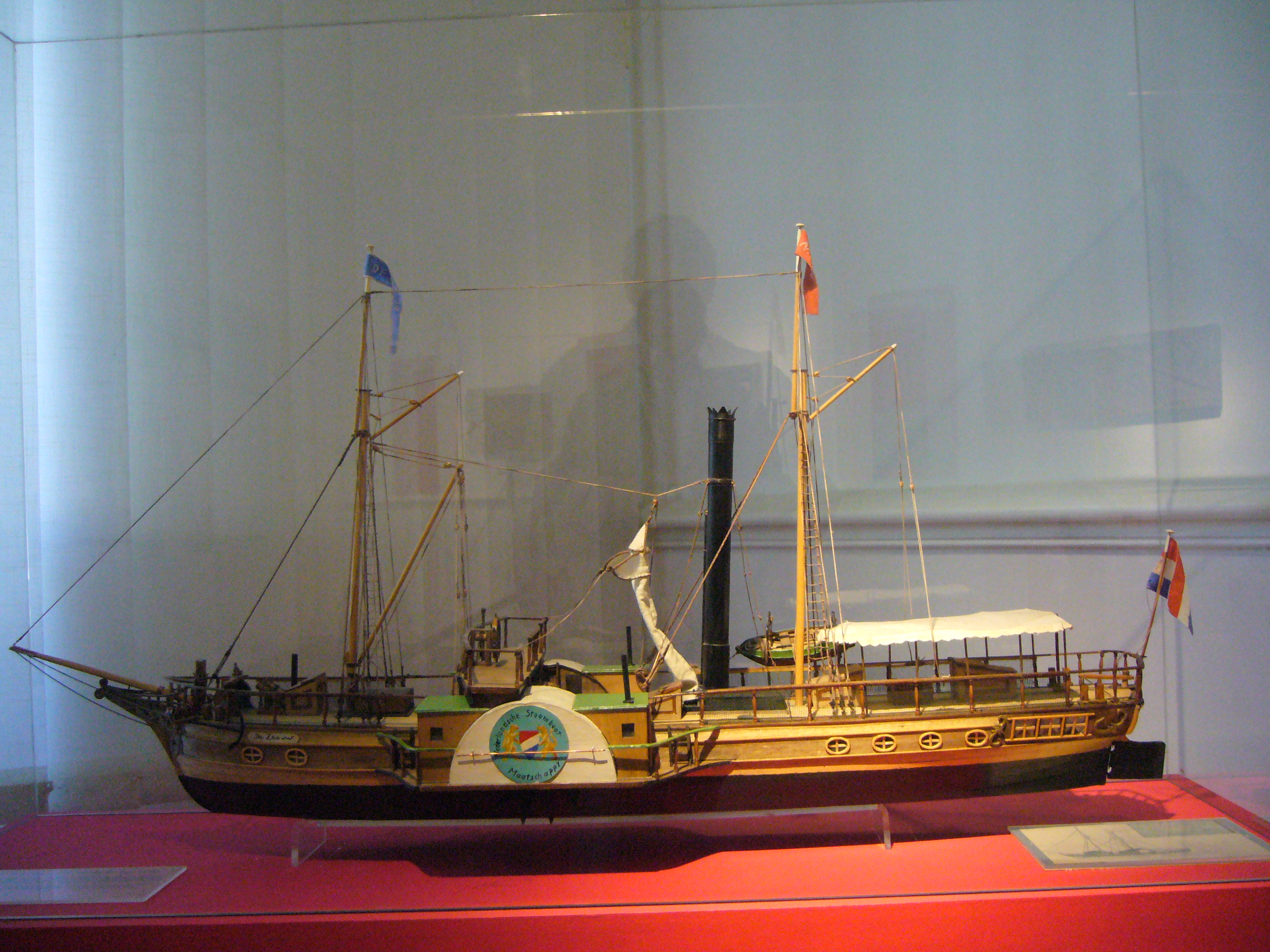
De Zeeuw was the first steamboat to reach up to Kaub

In 1822 Roentgen was one of the founders of Van Vollenhoven, Dutilh & Co., a shipping line that built De Nederlander, the first Dutch steamboat, albeit with a British engine. She made her first trip on 3 June 1823.

In November 1823 Roentgen was one of the founders of the Nederlandsche Stoomboot Maatschappij (NSM). This was a shipping line with two equally powerful executives. Of these, Roentgen became the executive for materiel and also the engineer of NSM. NSM took over the shipping line from Rotterdam to Antwerp, and soon opened lines to Veere, Nijmegen, and Arnhem. In May 1825 the shipyard of H. Blanken in Oost IJsselmonde was bought, so NSM could build steamboats. Somewhat later, NSM founded its own shipyard Fijenoord. At first the steam engines for the ships came from John Cockerill & Cie.

=== Trips on the Rhine ===
A more ambitious project of NSM was the idea to establish steamboat lines on the Rhine. Merchants from Cologne were interested, and took shares in NSM. On 26 October 1824 Roentgen then left Rotterdam on board De Zeeuw, the second steamboat of NSM. The goal was Cologne, which was reached on 29 October, after steaming for 37 hours and 17 minutes. Here De Zeeuw towed a sailing ship with 2,000 hundredweight of cereals upstream. The experiment convinced the Cologne merchants of the potential of steam power. The expedition with De Zeeuw would succeed in reaching Kaub, about halfway between Coblenz and Mainz.

In 1825 Roentgen made another trip on the Rhine. This time he was on board the new De Rijn. On 10 September 1825 she left Cologne to steam upstream. De Rijn succeeded in reaching Kehl on the Upper Rhine. On 21 September she reached Strasburg. In 1830 Roentgen was involved in the construction of the steamboat Stadt Mainz. In June 1832 he reached Basel on board Stadt Frankfurt in an expedition to investigate whether steamboats could reach that city.

=== Other projects ===
Roentgen was a visionary technician, and this led to some visionary projects. These were not always successful. The conversion of the sailing frigate Rijn would become a failure. The frigate was towed out of the water at the Rijkswerf Vlissingen in the late 1820s. She was then cut in two in order to insert a section for a paddle wheel and engine by Cockerill. The experiment failed, but predates the (successful) conversion of HMS Penelope, which began in 1842 by about 15 years.

The construction of the ocean liner Atlas for the Dutch East Indies was another revolutionary project. Atlas was launched by the shipyard Hoogendijk in Capelle aan de IJssel on 30 March 1826. She was the world's biggest steam ship in 1828, but was not rigid enough for steam propulsion. Atlas made a trip at sea, but was plagued by so many problems that the project was abandoned.

Pylades was another failure. She was a long sailing ship that made her trials on 17 December 1834. On 2 January 1835 Pylades set course for the East Indies, but sunk after being at sea for only a few hours. It turned into a financial disaster for NSM.

=== Later work ===
In 1839 Roentgen started the first steam ship for the Dutch East Indies that would actually reach the area. This was Batavia, launched in 1845. Soon Fijenoord received orders for ship steam engines from France and Russia.

Roentgen was also a regular adviser of the Preußisch-Rheinischen Dampfschiffahrts-Gesellschaft (PRDG) in Cologne. He was also an adviser of the Gutehoffnungshütte in Sterkrade.

In June 1848 Roentgen showed signs of a burnout. On 31 March 1849 he stepped down as chief executive. On 25 April 1849 he still attended a meeting of the supervisory board. In May 1849 Roentgen then had to lay down the management of NSM and its shipyard Fijenoord due to a burnout. The last years of his life he became insane. In June 1852 he was brought to the institute Meer en Berg in Santpoort-Zuid near Velsen, where he died at age 57.In June 1848 Roentgen showed signs of a burn-out. On 25 April 1849 Roentgen he still attended a meeting of the supervisory board. A street in the neighborhood Feijenoord is named after him.

== Works ==
- Roentgen, Gerhard Mauritz (1825). Verhandeling over de stoombooten (in Dutch). Joh. Altheer.

== Literature ==
- De Boer, M.G. (1923), Leven en bedrijf von Gerhard Moritz Roentgen, grondvester van de Nederlandsche-Stoomboot-Maatschappij, thans Maatschappij voor Scheeps- en Werktuigbouw Feijenoord (in Dutch), Rotterdam
- Weber, Heinz (1974), "Gerhard Moritz Roentgen, der Vater der Rheinschiffahrt", Heimat-Jahrbuch 1974 des Landkreises Neuwied
