= Eastney Beam Engine House =

Building in Portsmouth, England

Coordinates: 50.7889°N 1.0457°W

External images
- General external view (Geograph image)
- Woolf compound beam engine (Geograph image)
- Centrifugal storm water pumps (Geograph image)

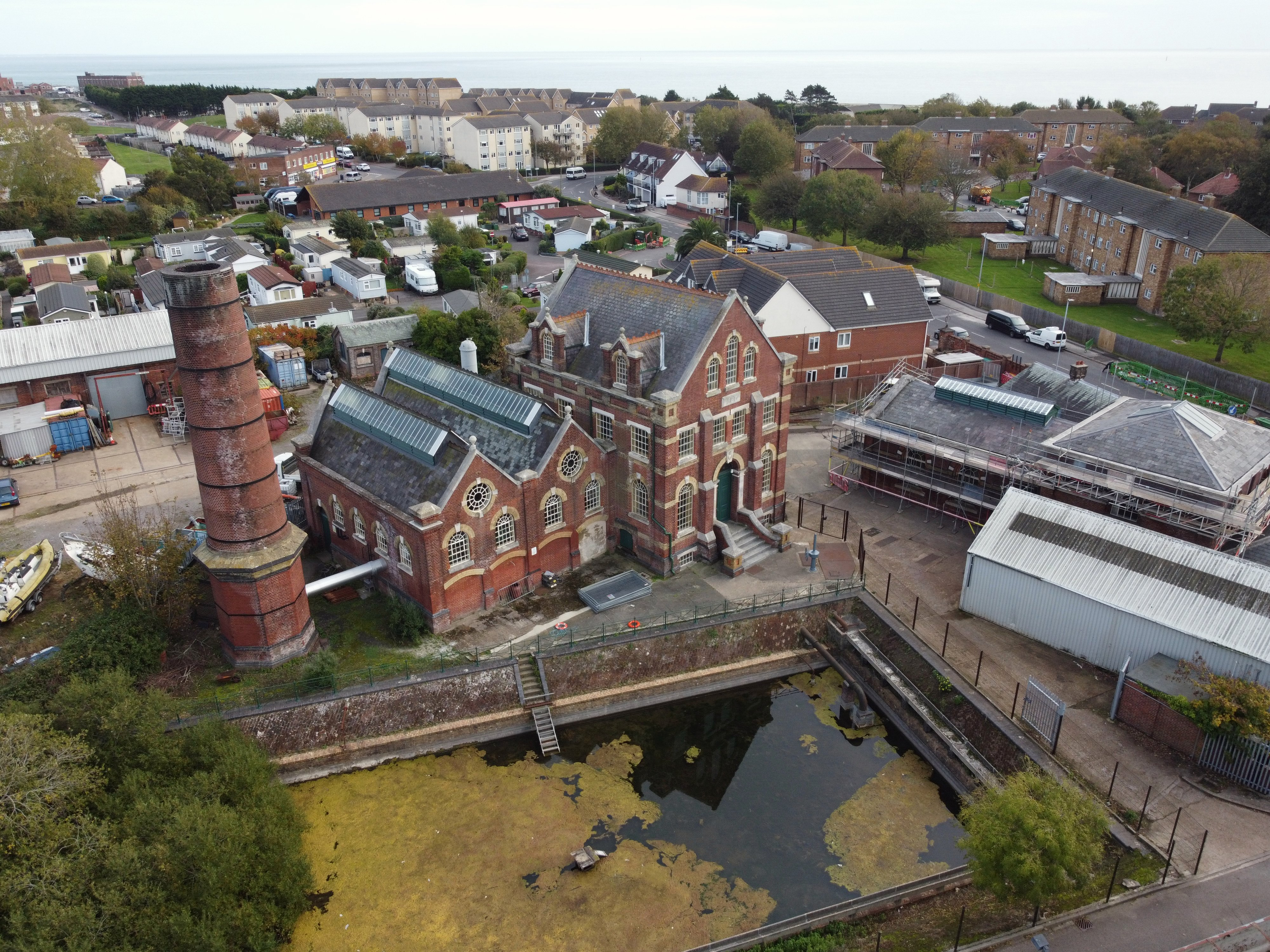
Eastney Beam Engine House

Eastney Beam Engine House is a Grade II -listed Victorian engine house in Portsmouth, Hampshire, England. Dating from 1887, it contains two 150 hp James Watt & Co. beam engines. The pumps were built as part of a plan to improve Portsmouth's sewage system. The other element of the plan was large holding tanks which held the sewage until the pumps could empty them into the ebb tide. The pumps have since been superseded by advancing technology but have been restored (in 1980). The restoration was funded by grants totalling £10,066 from Portsmouth city council, £4000 from Hampshire county council and £2000 from the Department of the Environment. The Engine House is now open to the public as a museum, owned by Portsmouth City Council (Museums Service) but operated by volunteers; consequently is only open on the last weekend in every month.

The beam and flywheel of the engine in action

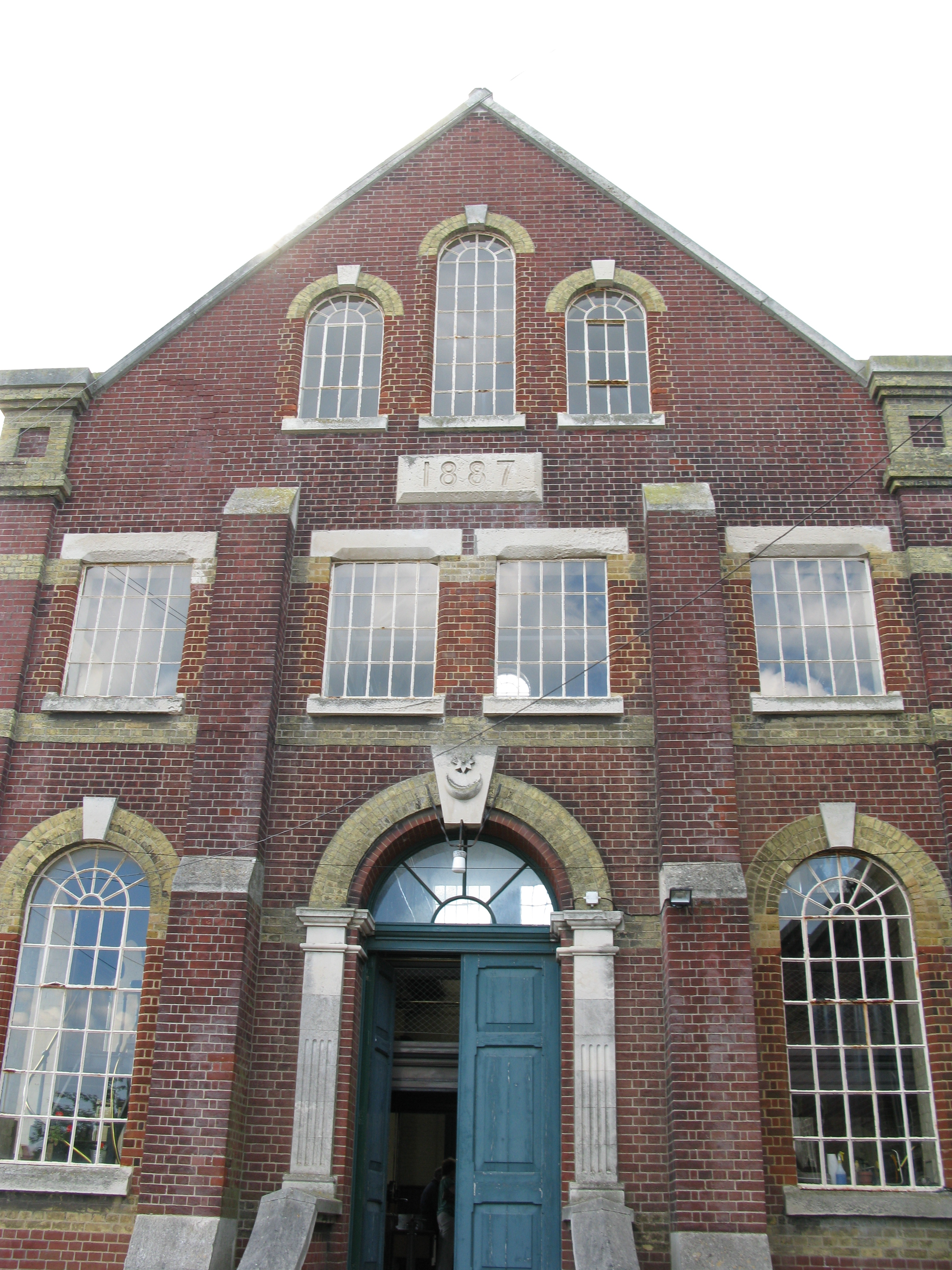
Entrance to the Eastney Beam Engine House
