= Beam engine =

Early configuration of the steam engine

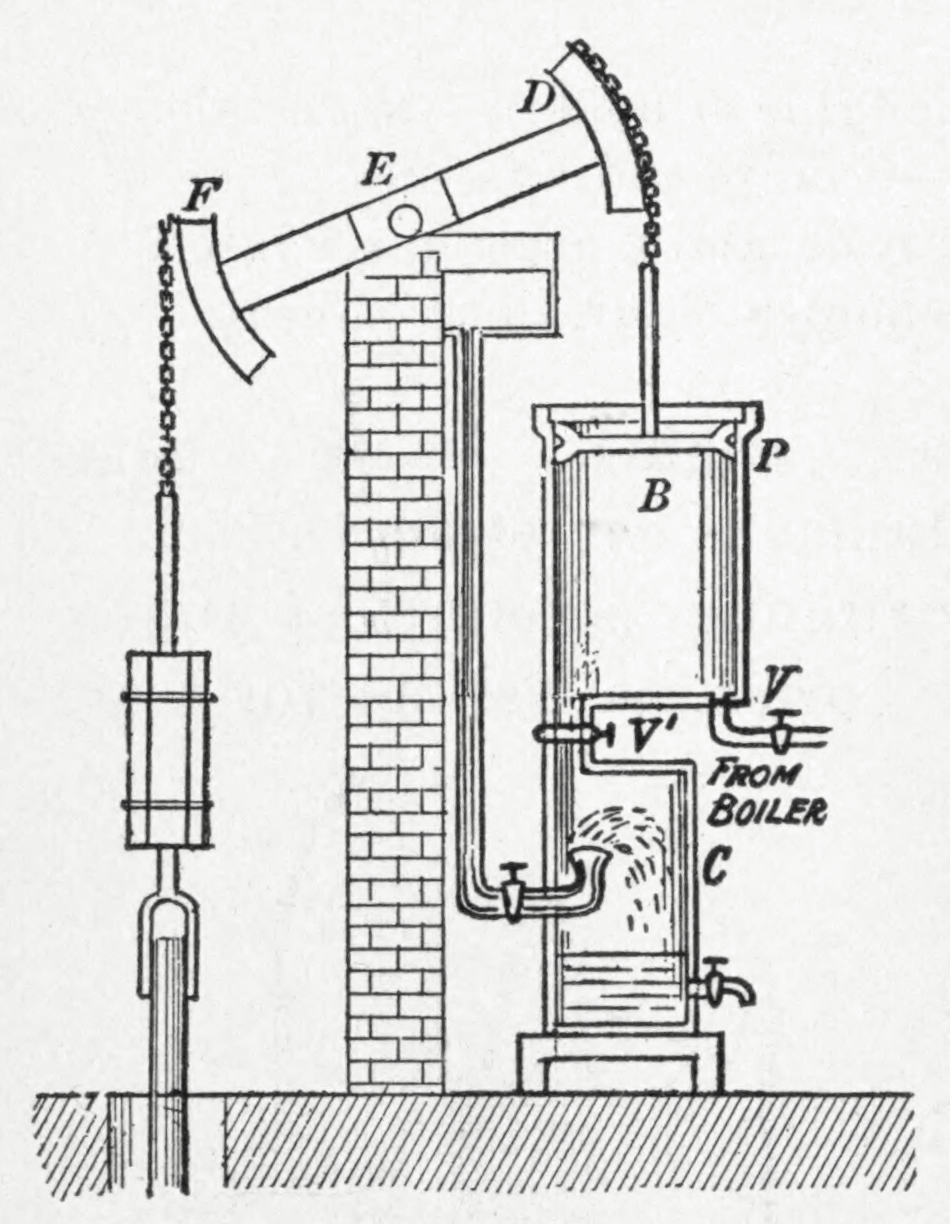
A Watt engine: showing entry of steam and water

A beam engine is a type of steam engine where a pivoted overhead beam is used to apply the force from a vertical piston to a vertical connecting rod. This configuration, with the engine directly driving a pump, was first used by Thomas Newcomen around 1705 to remove water from mines in Cornwall. The efficiency of the engines was improved by engineers including James Watt, who added a separate condenser; Jonathan Hornblower and Arthur Woolf, who compounded the cylinders; and William McNaught, who devised a method of compounding an existing engine. Beam engines were first used to pump water out of mines or into canals but could be used to pump water to supplement the flow for a waterwheel powering a mill.

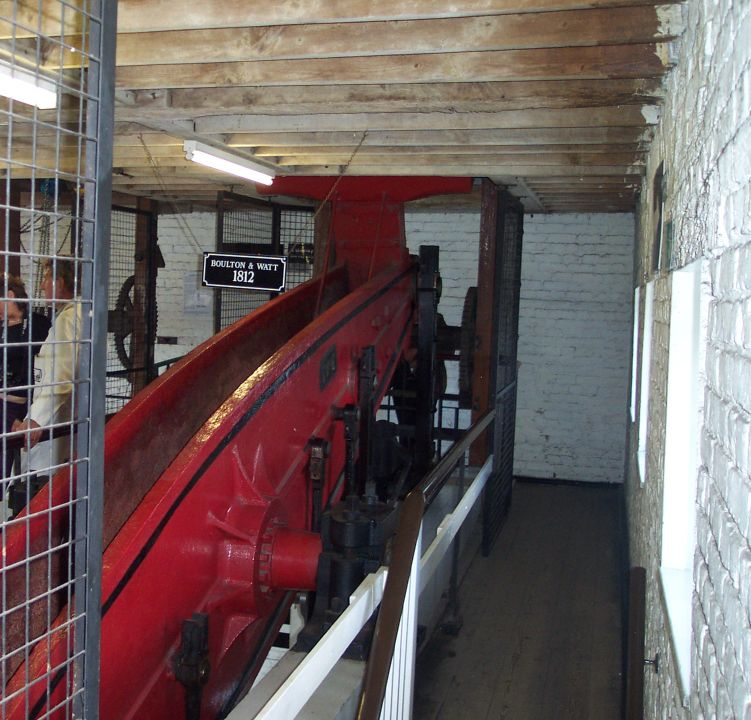
The cast-iron beam of the 1812 Boulton & Watt engine at Crofton Pumping Station – the oldest working, in situ example in the world

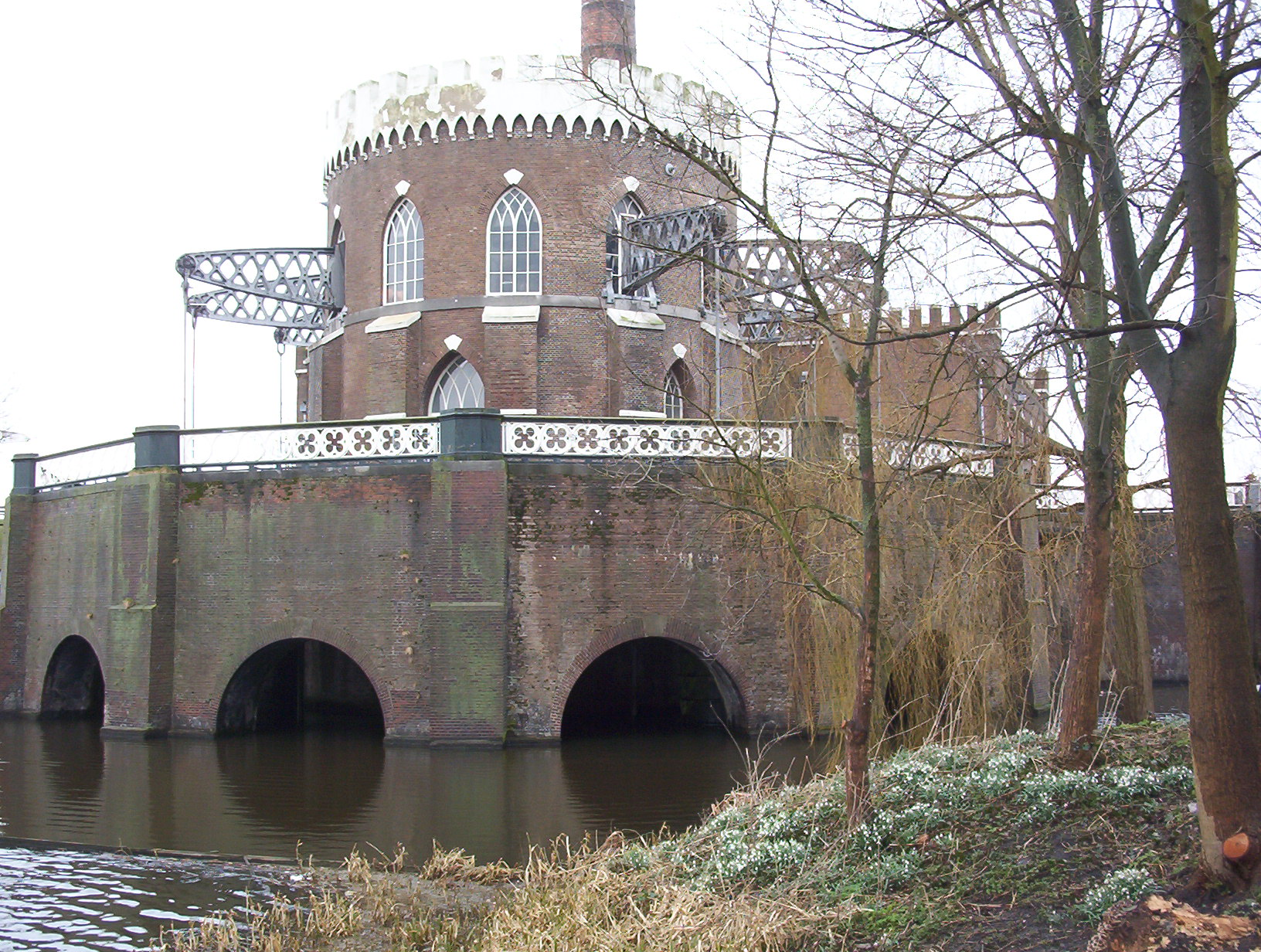
Back of Museum De Cruquius near Amsterdam, an old pumping station used to pump dry the Haarlemmermeer. It shows the beams of the pumping engine and the nine-meter drop in water level from the Spaarne river. The beam engine is the largest ever constructed, and was in use till 1933.

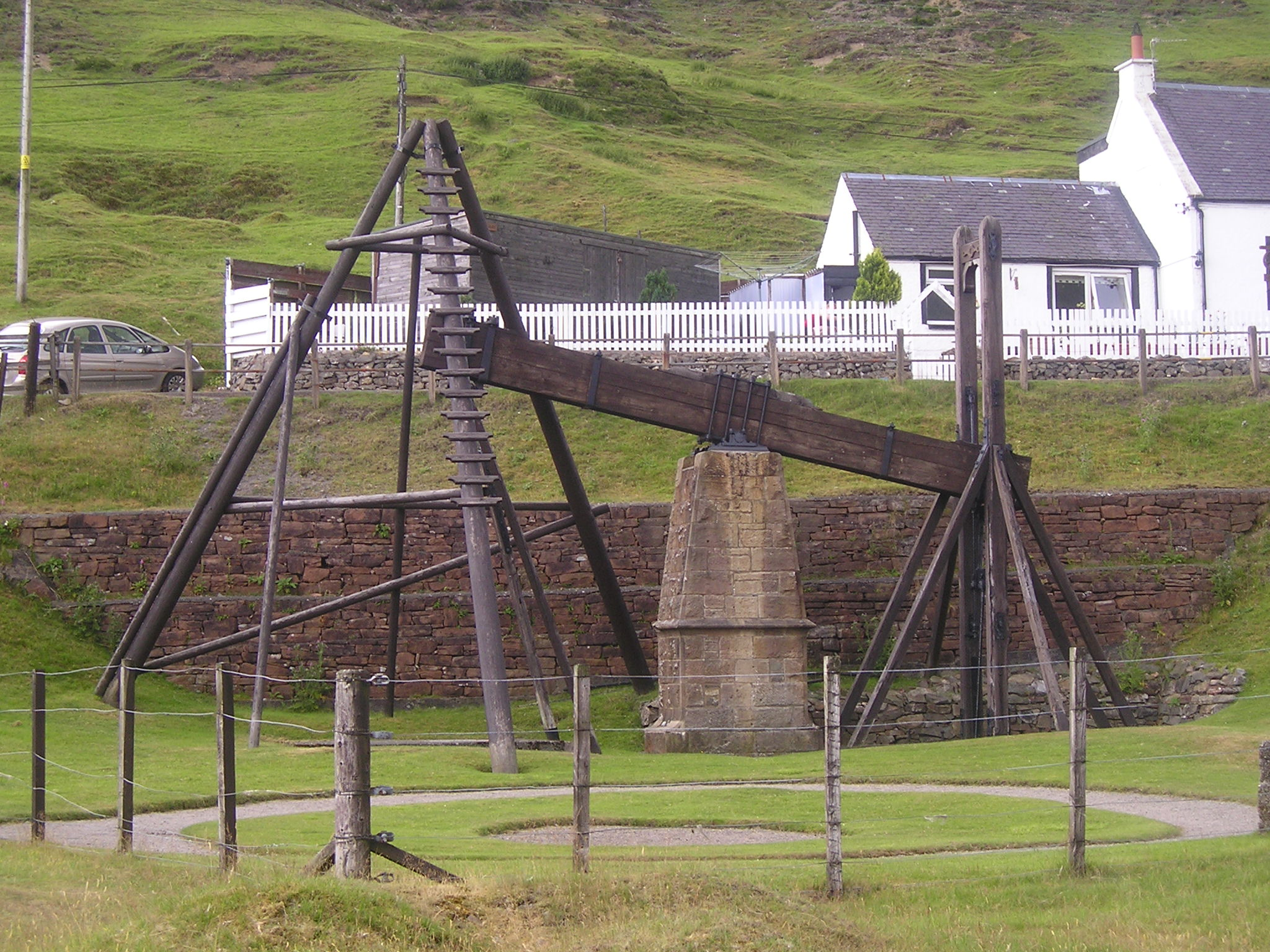
The remains of a water-powered beam engine at Wanlockhead

The rotative beam engine is a later design of beam engine where the connecting rod drives a flywheel by means of a crank (or, historically, by means of a sun and planet gear). These beam engines could be used to directly power the line-shafting in a mill. They also could be used to power steam ships.

== History ==
The first beam engines were water-powered and used to pump water from mines. A preserved example may be seen at the Straitsteps Lead Mine in Wanlockhead in Scotland.

Beam engines were extensively used to power pumps on the English canal system when it was expanded by means of locks early in the Industrial Revolution, and also to drain water from mines in the same period, and as winding engines.

The first steam-related beam engine was developed by Thomas Newcomen. This was not, strictly speaking, steam powered, as the steam introduced below the piston was condensed to create a partial vacuum thus allowing atmospheric pressure to push down the piston. It was therefore called an Atmospheric Engine. The Newcomen atmospheric engine was adopted by many mines in Cornwall and elsewhere, but it was relatively inefficient and consumed a large quantity of fuel. The engine was improved by John Smeaton but James Watt resolved the main inefficiencies of the Newcomen engine in his Watt steam engine by the addition of a separate condenser, thus allowing the cylinder to remain hot. Technically this was still an atmospheric engine until (under subsequent patents) he enclosed the upper part of the cylinder, introducing steam to also push the piston down. This made it a true steam engine and arguably confirms him as the inventor of the steam engine. He also patented the centrifugal governor and the parallel motion. the latter allowed the replacement of chains round an arch head and thus allowed its use as a rotative engine.

His patents remained in place until the start of the 19th Century and some say that this held back development. However, in reality development had been ongoing by others and at the end of the patent period there was an explosion of new ideas and improvements. Watt's beam engines were used commercially in much larger numbers and many continued to run for 100 years or more.

Watt held patents on key aspects of his engine's design, but his rotative engine was equally restricted by James Pickard's patent of the simple crank. The beam engine went on to be considerably improved and enlarged in the tin- and copper-rich areas of south west England, which enabled the draining of the deep mines that existed there. Consequently, the Cornish beam engines became world-famous, as they remain among the most massive beam engines ever constructed.

Because of the number of patents on various parts of the engines and the consequences of patent infringements, examples exist of Beam Engines with no makers name on any of the parts (Hollycombe Steam Collection).

== Rotative beam engines ==
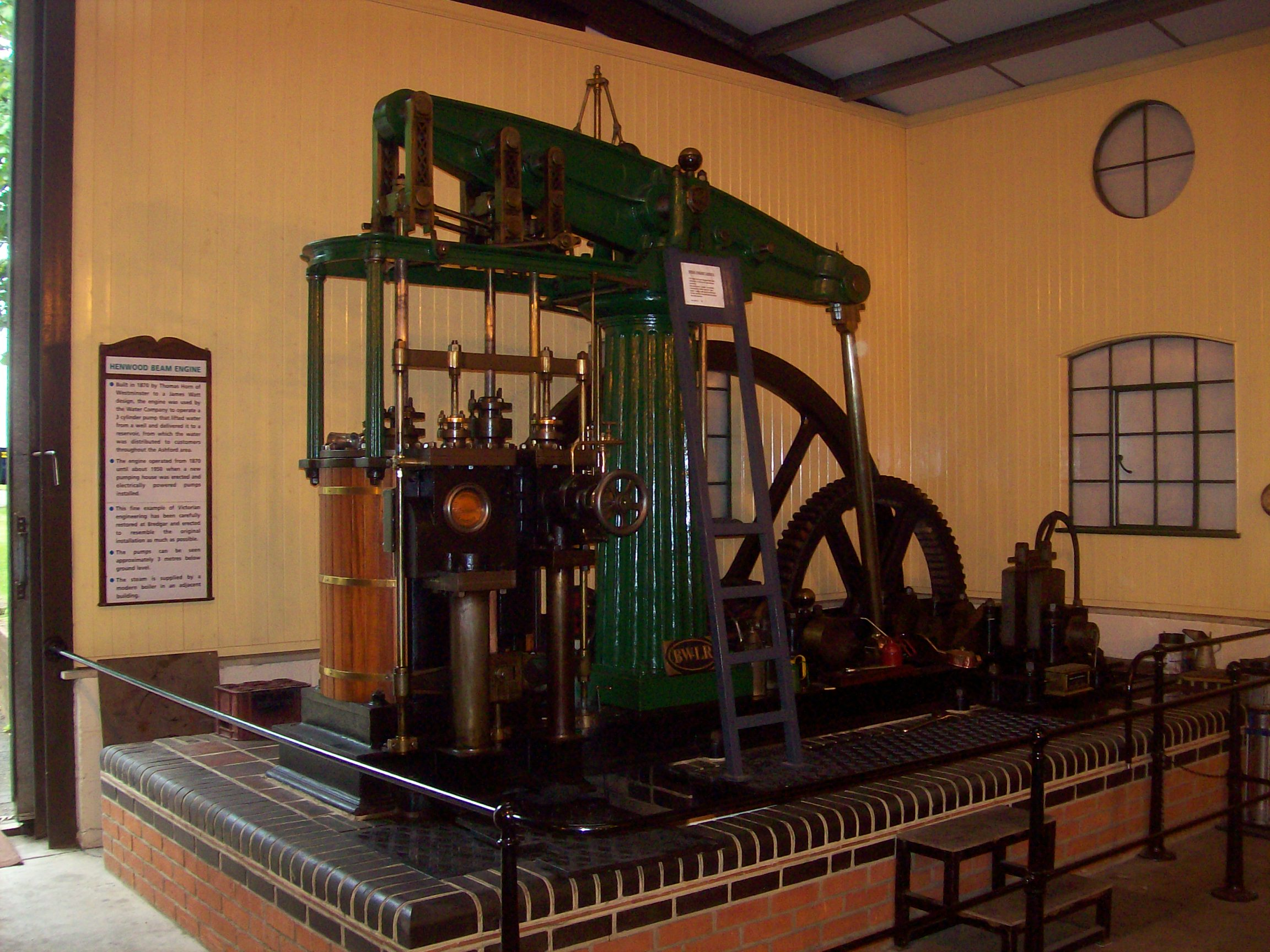
A small rotative beam engine, built in 1870 by Thomas Horn to a design by James Watt. The crank is visible at the front, the flywheel partly hidden by the engine. Originally installed in a waterworks in Ashford, it is now preserved and operating at the Bredgar and Wormshill Light Railway.

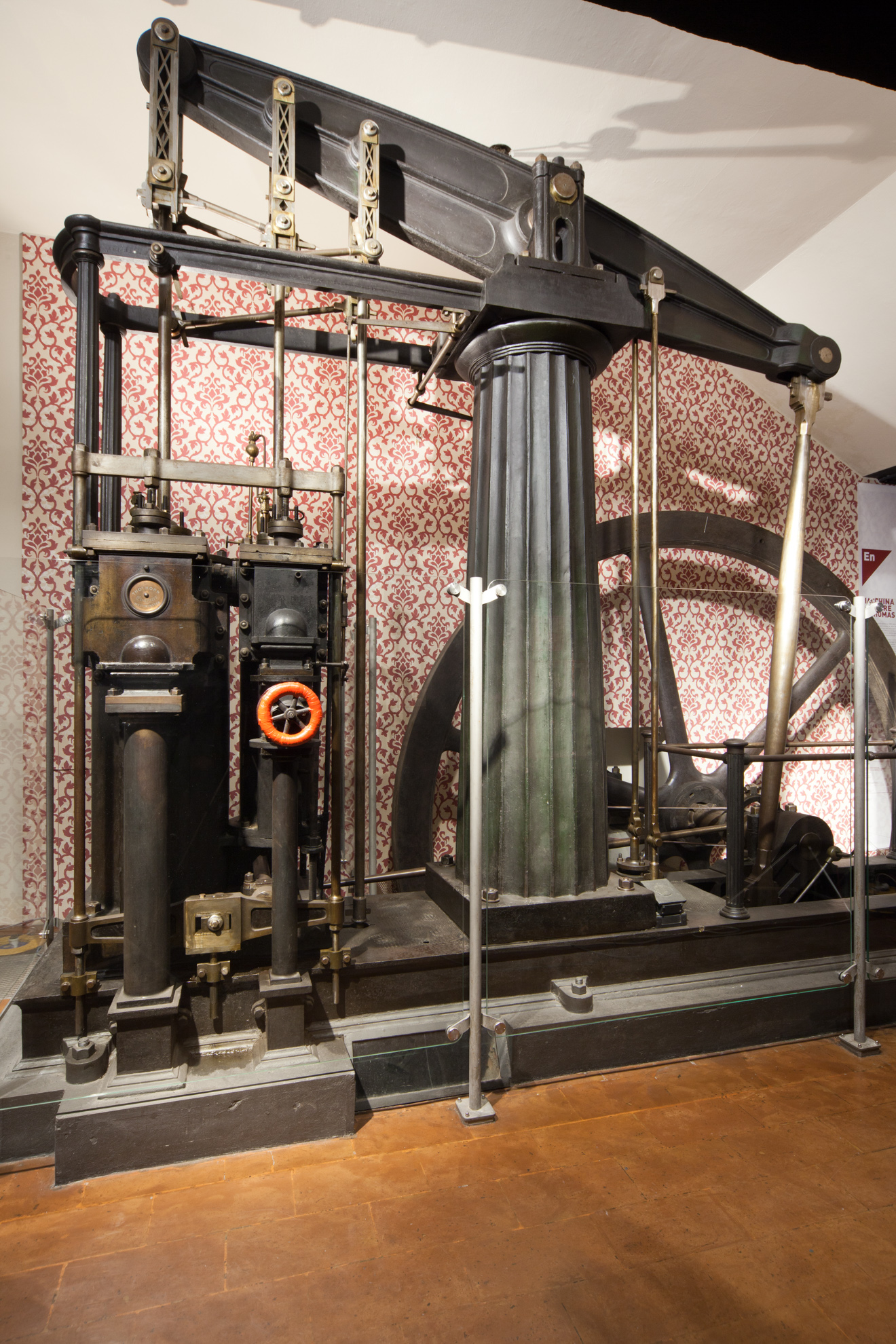
Beam machine by Thomas Horn Museo Nazionale della Scienza e della Tecnologia "Leonardo da Vinci", Milan

In a rotative beam engine, the piston is mounted vertically, and the piston rod drives the beam as before. A connecting rod from the other end of the beam, rather than driving a pump rod, now drives a flywheel.

Early Watt engines used Watt's patent sun and planet gear, rather than a simple crank, as use of the latter was protected by a patent owned by James Pickard. Once the patent had expired, the simple crank was employed universally. Once rotary motion had been achieved a drive belt could be attached beside the flywheel. This transmitted the power to other drive shafts and from these other belts could then be attached to power a variety of static machinery e.g. threshing, grinding or milling machines.

=== Marine beam engines ===
The first steam-powered ships used variants of the rotative beam engine. These marine steam engines – known as side-lever, grasshopper, crosshead, or 'walking beam', among others – all varied from the original land-based machines by locating the beam or beams in different positions to take up less room on board ship.

== Compounding ==
Compounding involves two or more cylinders; low-pressure steam from the first, high-pressure, cylinder is passed to the second cylinder where it expands further and provides more drive. This is the compound effect; the waste steam from this can produce further work if it is then passed into a condenser in the normal way. The first experiment with compounding was conducted by Jonathan Hornblower, who took out a patent in 1781. His first engine was installed at Tincroft Mine, Cornwall. It had two cylinders – one 21-inch (0.53 m) diameter with 6-foot (1.8 m) stroke and one 27-inch (0.69 m) diameter with 8-foot (2.4 m) stroke – placed alongside each other at one end of the beam. The early engines showed little performance gain: the steam pressure was too low, interconnecting pipes were of small diameter and the condenser ineffective.

At this time the laws of thermodynamics were not adequately understood, particularly the concept of absolute zero. Engineers such as Arthur Woolf were trying to tackle an engineering problem with an imperfect understanding of the physics. In particular, their valve gear was cutting-in at the wrong position in the stroke, not allowing for expansive working in the cylinder. Successful Woolf compound engines were produced in 1814, for the Wheal Abraham copper mine and the Wheal Vor tin mine.

== McNaught engines ==
William McNaught patented a compound beam engine in 1845. On a beam engine of the standard Boulton & Watt design he placed a high-pressure cylinder, on the opposite side of the beam to the existing single cylinder, where the water pump was normally fitted. This had two important effects: it massively reduced the pressure on the beam, and the connecting steam pipe, being long, acted as an expansive receiver – the element missing in the Woolf design. This modification could be made retrospectively, and engines so modified were said to be "McNaughted". The advantages of a compound engine were not significant at pressures under 60 pounds per square inch (410 kPa), but showed at over 100 psi (690 kPa).

== Preserved beam engines ==
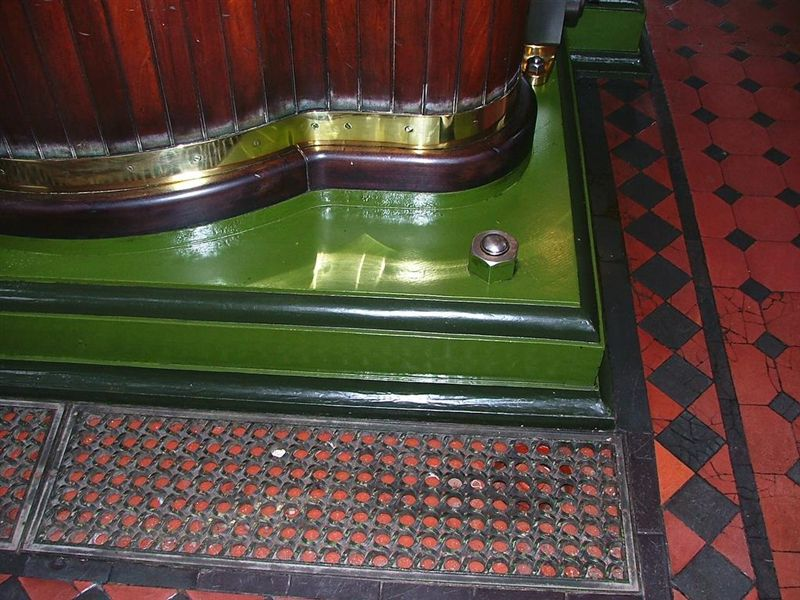
Baseplate and mahogany lagging, beam engine, British Engineerium, Brighton

- Abbey Pumping Station (Leicester, England) – houses four Woolf compound rotative beam engines built by Gimson and Company, Leicester.
- Bolton Steam Museum (Bolton, England) – includes several rotative beam engines originally used to drive mills
- Claymills Pumping Station (Burton upon Trent, England) – four Woolf compound, rotative, beam pumping engines; five Lancashire boilers; over thirty auxiliary engines on the site, including the oldest working steam driven dynamo in the country.
- Coldharbour Mill (Uffculme, Devon) – 1867 Kittoe and Brotherhood beam engine plus Pollit & Wigzell 300 hp cross compound engine. In steam most Bank Holidays driving the rope race, together with other smaller machines.
- Coultershaw Beam Pump (West Sussex, England) – preserved water-powered beam engine from 1782.
- Crofton Pumping Station (Great Bedwyn, England) – two engines, including the oldest working 'Cornish' engine, in its original location, in the world (1812).
- Crossness Pumping Station (Abbey Wood, England) – set of four rotative beam engines: the largest surviving working examples.
- Dalton Old Pump House (County Durham, England) – a statically-preserved pair of Cornish non-rotative engines, dating from 1879.
- Dogdyke Engine (Tattershall, England) – drainage engine and scoop wheel, steamed summer weekends.
- Dundee Boulton and Watt engine (1801) from Douglasfield Bleachworks, now on display in Verdant Works
- Eastney Beam Engine House (Portsmouth, England) – contains two rotative beam engines for sewage-pumping, dating from 1887.
- Elsecar Heritage Centre (Elsecar, England) – the only surviving Newcomen engine (in the world) to have remained in its original location (1795).
- Garlogie Beam Engine (Aberdeenshire) – Boulton and Watt engine, with beam from 1805.
- Goulburn Waterworks (Goulburn, Australia) – Appleby Bros Beam Engine (1883) 120 hp in working order still in the original pump house building.
- Grazebrook beam engine- A large pumping Boulton & Watt designed with a 42-inch (1.1 m) bore on static display on the Dartmouth roundabout on the A38(M) in Birmingham, England.
- Hollycombe Steam Collection (Liphook, England) – A small (approx 5 horse power) working rotative bean engine dating from approx 1850, used to power farm machinery, with a water wheel attached to supplement the power.
- Levant Mine and Beam Engine (Trewellard, England) – a working beam engine on a National Trust property in West Cornwall, England
- Markfield Beam Engine (Tottenham, England) – a compound, rotative engine.
- Middleton Top Engine House, Middleton-by-Wirksworth, Derbyshire. The twin beam engine (built in 1829) is the world’s oldest working reciprocating winding engine still in its original engine house.
- Museum De Cruquius (Cruquius, The Netherlands) – the eight-beamed engine at Cruquius is thought to be the largest steam engine ever built
- Newcomen Memorial Engine (Dartmouth, England) – dating from about 1725. Hydraulic mechanism added for demonstration purposes.
- Nottingham Industrial Museum (Nottingham, England) – The Steam Gallery contains an impressive Basford Beam Engine, one of a pair of engines built in 1858 by R&W Hawthorn in Newcastle upon Tyne. It was installed at Basford Pumping Station to lift water 110 ft (34 m) from the sandstone below to supply fresh water to the City of Nottingham. The engine was replaced in 1965 and was removed to the purpose-built Steam Gallery where it was first fired in 1975.
- Pinchbeck Engine (Spalding, England) – statically preserved 'A'-frame engine.
- Poldark Mine (Trenear, England) – Harvey's of Hayle Cornish Beam Engine from Bunny Tin Mine and later Greensplat China Clay Pit dating from about 1850. Hydraulic mechanism added for demonstration purposes. Last to have worked commercially in Cornwall to December 1959, moved to Poldark in 1972.
- Ryhope Engines Museum (Ryhope, England) – twin rotative beam engines; built 1868.
- San Francisco National Maritime Museum (San Francisco, U.S.) - Holds the ferry boat Eureka, a San Francisco Bay ferry built in 1890 as the Ukiah, she houses a walking beam engine onboard and is the last example of a marine walking beam engine afloat.
- Shelburne Museum (Shelburne, U.S.) - Houses the Ticonderoga, a Lake Champlain ferry built in 1906. Onboard is only one of two marine walking beam engines left in the entire world.
- Smethwick Engine (Smethwick, England) – oldest working steam engine in the world (1779).
- Stretham Old Engine (Stretham, England) – Statically preserved engine and scoop wheel.
- Strumpshaw Steam Museum (Strumpshaw, England) – Features a now Compressed Air powered former beam engine from Addington.
- Tees Cottage Pumping Station (Darlington, England) – a working rotative, two-cylinder Woolf compound engine, designed by Glenfield and Kennedy of Kilmarnock and built by Teasdale Bros, under T&C Hawksley, Civil Engineers, London.
- The Boulton and Watt rotative beam engine (sun and planet type) at the National Museum of Scotland (1786). Occasional working by pneumatics
- The Caprington Colliery Newcomen engine at the National Museum of Scotland. Occasional working on pneumatics.
- The Henry Ford Museum (Dearborn, Michigan, US) – Fairbottom Bobs, a Newcomen engine of the 1760s.
- London Museum of Water & Steam (Brentford, England) – five 'Cornish' engines (in original location) of which four are operational, together with two operational rotative beam engines (in museum), including the largest working 'Cornish' engine in the world with a 90-inch (2,286 mm) Cylinder.
- Western Springs Water Works (Auckland, New Zealand) – 1877 double Woolf compound engine. In original location, restored in working order with Transport and Technology Museum built around it. The restoration of the Pumphouse and original Engineers cottage was awarded with the 2009 Award of Merit from UNESCO's Asia-Pacific Heritage Awards for Culture Heritage Conservation programme.

== See also ==
- Boulton & Watt
- Cataract (beam engine)
- Cornish engine
- Gimson and Company
- Man engine
- Marine steam engine
- Mining in Cornwall
- Prestongrange Industrial Heritage Museum
- Pumpjack
- Six-column beam engine
- Stationary engine
- Arthur Woolf

== Bibliography ==
- Hills, Richard L. (1989). Power from Steam. Cambridge University Press. ISBN 0-521-45834-X.
