= William McNaught (Glasgow) =

Scottish engineer

William McNaught (1813–1881) was a Scottish engineer, from Glasgow, who patented a compound steam engine in 1845. This was a technique of improving the efficiency of a standard simple Boulton & Watt beam engine. The engine was compounded by adding a high-pressure cylinder between the support column and the flywheel, on the side opposite the low-pressure cylinder. This improvement could be retrospectively fitted to existing engines.

== Family ==
William McNaught was born on 27 May 1813 at Paisley, Renfrewshire, Scotland, son of John McNaught, the inventor of the McNaught indicator.

== Engine building ==
McNaught patented his compound steam engine in 1845 (Patent no. 11001). He relocated to Manchester in 1849.

The Robertson Street workshop was operated by William McNaught & Son as "Makers of Steam-Engine Indicators, Steam Gauges, etc" at 12 Hampden Terrace, Glasgow, at least until 1895.

MacNaught died in Chorlton upon Medlock, Manchester, on 8 January 1881, leaving two sons who carried on the business. He was buried in Glasgow.

== McNaught'ed beam engines ==
A beam engine might run at 5 psi (34 kPa), using one low-pressure cylinder steamed by an 1840 wagon boiler, but when McNaught'ed the new high-pressure cylinder could run at over 60 psi (410 kPa), which the then-new Lancashire boiler could produce. In addition the stress on the centre of the beam was substantially reduced, and stress on the crank pin slightly reduced. This was important in preventing beam failure.

Many engine makers McNaught'ed existing beam engines, including William McNaught of Rochdale, as the thermodynamic (and fuel efficiency) benefits of high-pressure steam were beginning to be understood.

Bolton Steam Museum displays a McNaught'ed beam engine. The Cellars Clough mill engine was McNaught'ed by Woodhouse and Mitchell of Brighouse in 1909.
