= Arthur Woolf =

Cornish engineer (1766-1837)

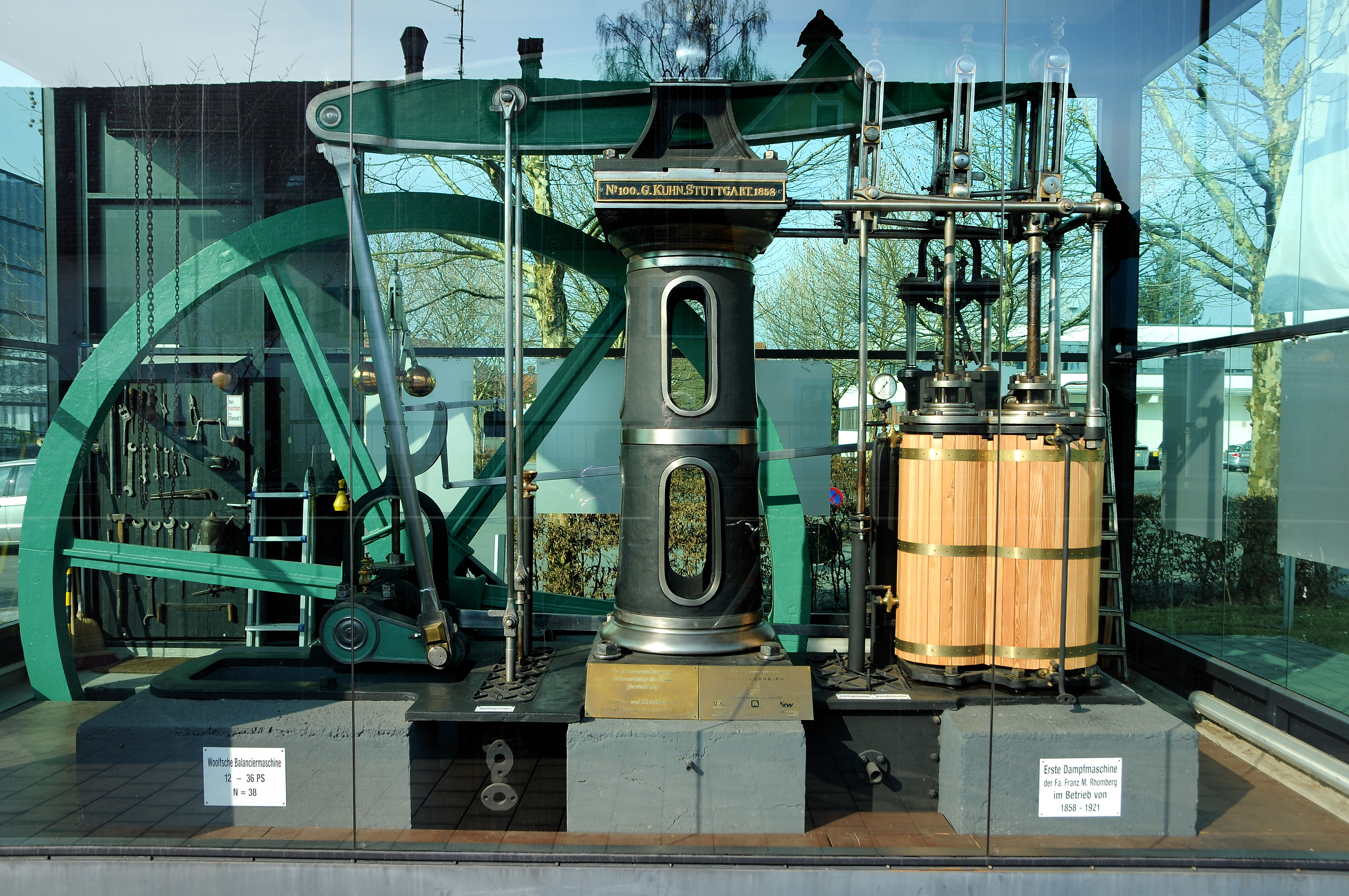
- Woolf compound beam engine of 1858
- Born: 1766; Camborne, Cornwall, England, UK
- Died: 16 October 1837 (aged 70–71); Guernsey
- Spouse(s): wife no 1 Emblin Vincent
- Parent: Arthur Woolf
- Engineering career
- Discipline: Mechanical engineer
- Significant design: high-pressure compound steam engine

Arthur Woolf (1766, Camborne, Cornwall – 16 October 1837, Guernsey) was a Cornish engineer, most famous for inventing a high-pressure compound steam engine. In this way he made an outstanding contribution to the development and perfection of the Cornish engine.

Woolf left Cornwall in 1785 to work for Joseph Bramah's engineering works in London. He worked there and at other firms as an engineer and engine builder until 1811 experimenting with high pressure steam and a much improved boiler. He then returned to Cornwall. Michael Loam, who introduced the man engine to the UK, was trained by him.

When he returned to Cornwall, beam engine designs were crude, shackled by outdated Watt patents and poor engineering, struggling to compete with large water wheels, even used underground. He learned from Bramah that to move forward meant adopting much improved engineering techniques, for it was Bramah who invented quality control. Woolf was chief engineer to Harvey & Co of Hayle, the leading engineering and foundry works, at this time the largest in the world. They eventually swallowed up the rival Copperhouse Foundry run by Sandys, Carne and Vivian. For very many years they were the leading firm worldwide for drainage engines, even supplying three eight-beamed pumping engines to the Dutch government to drain the Haarlemmermeer (see Museum De Cruquius). By the time Woolf retired in 1836 the Cornish engine, owing largely to his efforts, was a thing of magnificent beauty and efficiency.

In 1803, Woolf obtained a patent on an improved boiler for producing high pressure steam. In 1804, he patented his best-known invention, a compound steam engine.

== Woolf's compound engine ==
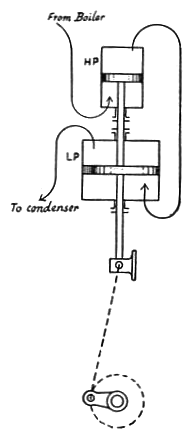

Woolf's engine was a parallel compound engine (Note: Like the tandem compound engine, the two cylinders worked in phase.) with two cylinders in which the steam worked in succession. These were both coupled to the same end of the beam of the engine. The operation of the engine can be described as being a high-pressure cylinder of Trevithick's high-pressure simple expansion engine, followed by a condensing cylinder of Watt's design. Woolf had worked as an engine erector for Hornblower and was familiar with his earlier work on compound engines. As a Cornishman, he was also familiar with Trevithick and his newly developed high-pressure 'puffer' engines that were then entering service. He recognised that, even with the new principle of expansion, the exhaust from a Trevithick engine was still of a pressure comparable to the inlet pressure of a Watt engine. From this step, it was a relatively simple matter to couple the two.

For most uses, the cylinders of the engine were double-acting. Opposing sides of the high- and low-pressure cylinders were cross-connected to each other. Where engines were used for pumping, (Note: Mine pumping engines commonly used single-acting plunger pumps, where their load was required to be driven in only one direction.) Woolf engines were also built with paired single-acting cylinders.

Examples of Woolf compound rotative beam engines may be seen at Abbey Pumping Station, Blagdon Lake, Claymills Pumping Station, The Hamilton Museum of Steam & Technology, and the Western Springs Pumphouse, now part of the Museum of Transport and Technology Auckland, New Zealand.

== See also ==
- Benjamin Hick

== Bibliography ==
- T. R. Harris, Arthur Woolf: The Cornish Engineer 1766-1837, (Truro: Bradford Barton Ltd., 1966).
- Edmund Vales, The Harveys of Hayle (Truro: D. B. Barton, 1966).
