= Richard L. Hills =

English historian and clergyman (1936–2019)

Richard Leslie Hills MBE (1 September 1936 – 10 May 2019) was an English historian and clergyman who wrote extensively on the history of technology, particularly steam power. He helped to found Manchester's Science & Industry Museum, where he was its first lecturer-in-charge.

== Background ==
Hills was born on 1 September 1936 in Lee Green, the second son of the Rev. Leslie Hills and Margaret Magdalen Miller ("Peggy"), daughter of John Ontario Miller. His mother died of cancer when he was two, and he spent his childhood in the care of an aunt in Tunbridge Wells.

His father Leslie Hills (1897–1983) was the elder son of Henry Hills of Kingsfield, Matfield, in 1938 a director of the brewers E. Robin & Son, and was born at Maidstone. He was educated at St Lawrence College, Ramsgate, and then served in World War I as an officer in the Royal Field Artillery, being awarded the Military Cross. He then went to Queens' College, Cambridge, where he graduated B.A. in 1920, and Ridley Hall. He was ordained deacon in the Church of England in 1921, and priest the following year. From 1921 to 1924 he was a curate in St Helens. From 1924 he was in the Sudan, for the first year as a chaplain and then at Juba for the Church Missionary Society to 1927.

In 1927 Leslie Hills returned to the United Kingdom, as a curate at Luton. He was a curate also at St James's Church, Paddington. He married, firstly on 10 July 1930, Margaret Miller. That year he became vicar of Christ Church, Rotherhithe. In 1935 he moved as vicar to the Church of the Good Shepherd, Lee Green.

Leslie Hills was an army chaplain during World War II, proceeding from OCTU to Operation Aerial, and the evacuation of Saint-Nazaire with the Brigade of Guards. He then became in 1945 vicar of Seal, Kent, and married, secondly, in 1949, Audrey Eleanor T. Mann (1906–1993), daughter of Gerard Noel Cornwallis Mann. In 1960 he became vicar of West Malling. He served as a member of the Palestine Commission of the London Society for Promoting Christianity Amongst the Jews.

== Education ==
Hills attended Charterhouse School in Godalming, Surrey. During National Service, he obtained a commission as 2nd Lieutenant in the Royal Artillery, ending up with the 26 Field Regiment at Folkestone during the Suez Crisis. He was sent to Lydd-on-Sea to supervise the accommodation for Territorial Army units practising shooting on the Dungeness ranges.

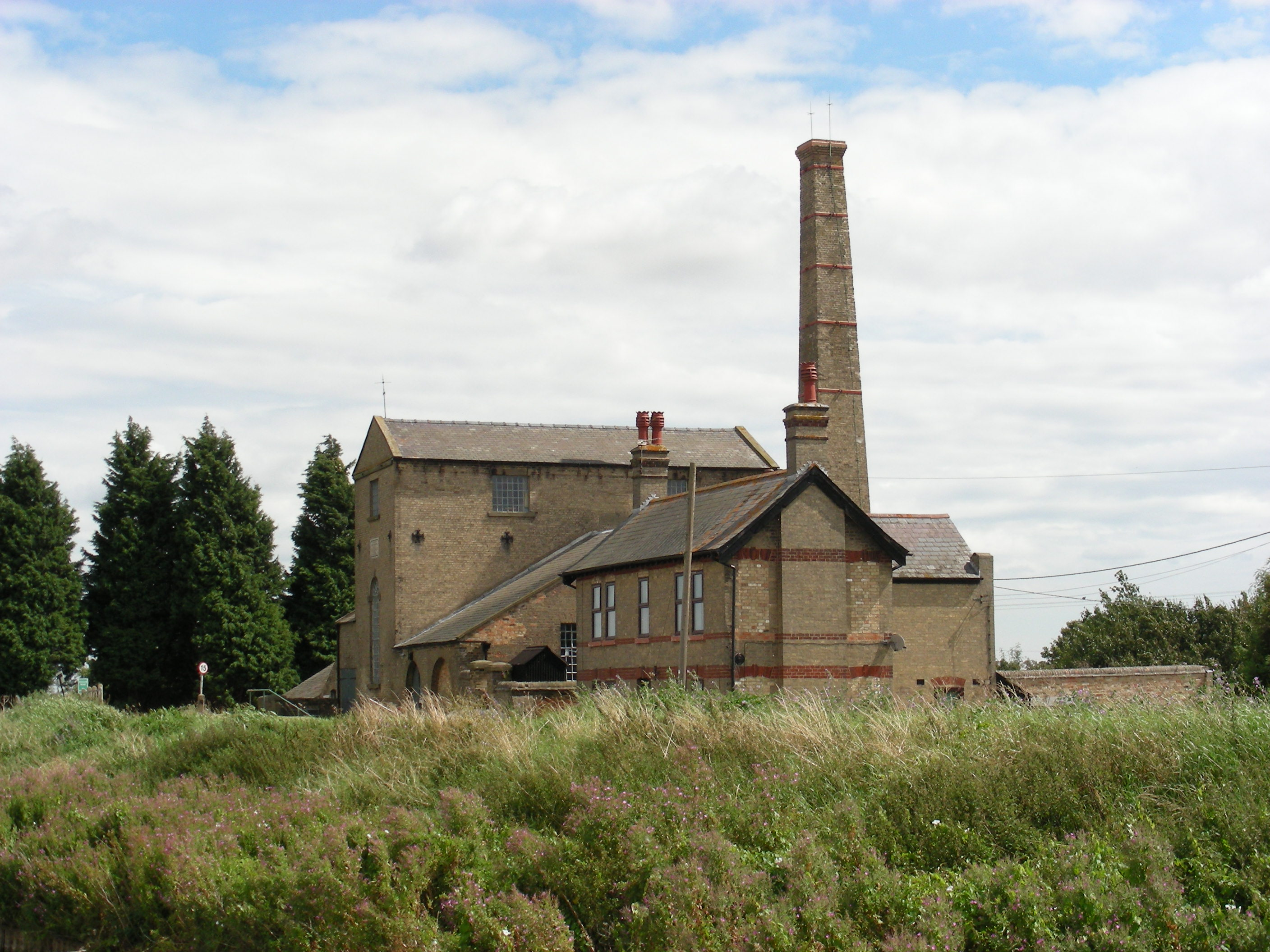
Stretham Old Engine

Hills then read for the History Tripos at Queens' College, Cambridge. Working to restore a Lancia Lambda, he had help from E. J. André Kenny and his wife. They were trying to restore the Stretham Old Engine that once drained the Fens. Finding a cache of old documents there relating to the Waterbeach Level, Hills was in possession of his first research direction.

== Postgraduate into research ==
After he had completed a Dip. Ed. at Cambridge, Hills spent brief period teaching. It included a spell at Worcester College for the Blind. He then carried out a year's research into fen drainage at Imperial College, London, and awarded the D.I.C..

With a recommendation from Rupert Hall at Imperial, Donald Cardwell offered Hills a post as research assistant in the History of Science Department at the University of Manchester Institute of Science & Technology (UMIST) to study the history of textile technology. From 1965 to 1968, he wrote a PhD at UMIST, living for a time near Hyde, Cheshire. He published his first book, Machines, Mills and Uncountable Costly Necessities, in 1967.

== Science & Industry Museum ==
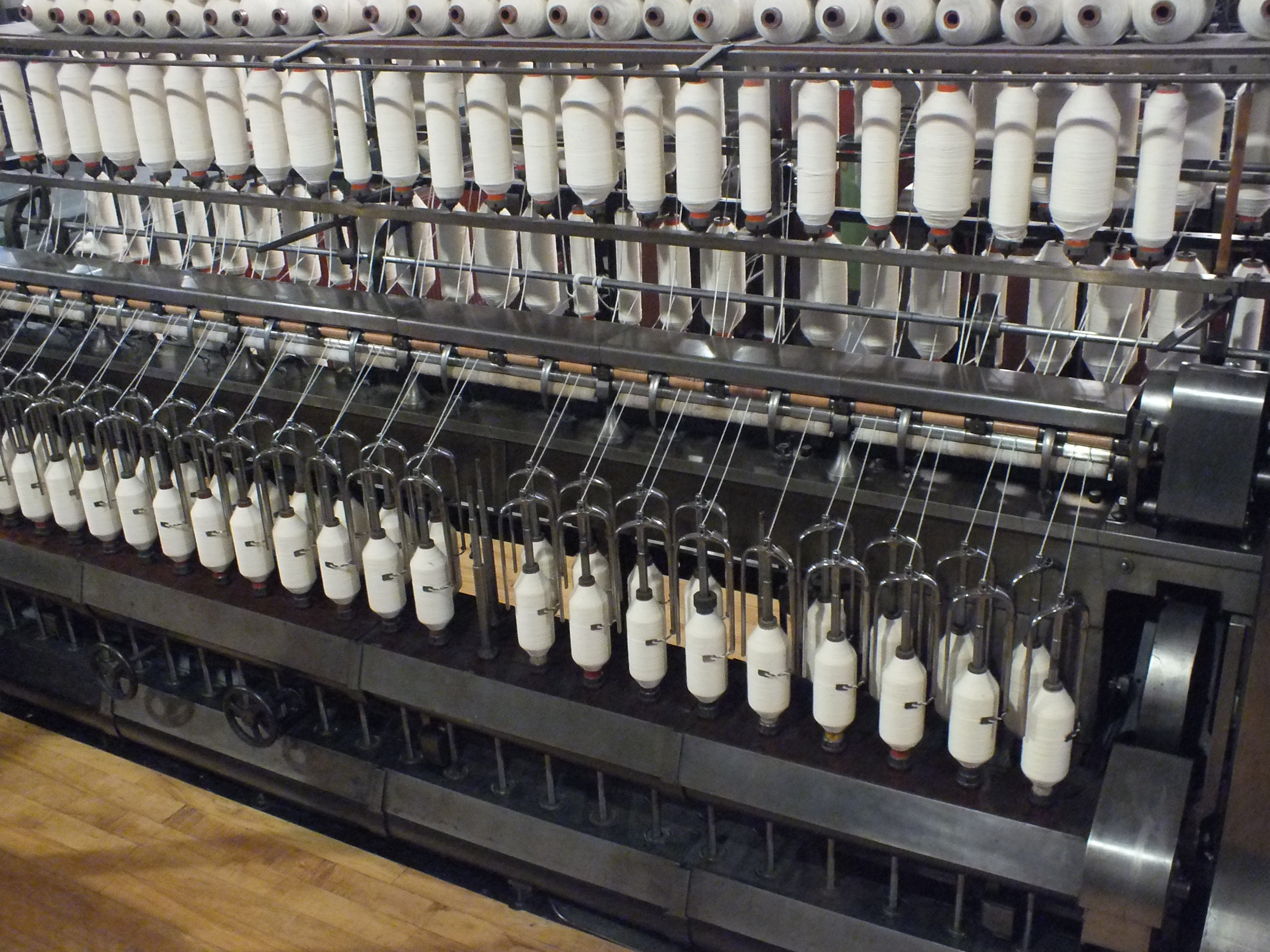
Ring spinning frame at the Science & Industry Museum, Manchester

Hills was instrumental, with help from Lord Bowden of UMIST, in preserving the archives of locomotive manufacturer Beyer, Peacock & Company, before there was adequate space to store them. He then in 1968 became the first curator of the Science & Industry Museum in Manchester.

Hills wrote "I tried so hard ... to preserve the exhibits in working order and have them demonstrated regularly." He decided to concentrate on mill engines of medium size that would still be impressive — they could be demonstrated under steam from a modern package boiler — and that the museum would collect exhibits they could not display immediately. The first Chief Engineer with whom he worked was Frank Wightman, who began as an apprentice at George Saxon & Co in 1927. Hills described him as

a really experienced millwright of the old school, who needed all the tricks he had learnt over the years to effect the removal of these engines.

Hills lived for a time in a cottage at Styal. He then moved to Mottram in Longdendale. In 1983 the museum moved from its initial and temporary site on Grosvenor Street to the site of the former Manchester Liverpool Road railway station.

=== Accessions ===
Offered a steam beam engine of around 1830 (like those that would have driven the first cotton spinning mills), he decided to dismantle it for storage. Likewise he accepted an offer of one of the last steam mill engines ever built, the 1925 Galloway engine from Elm Street Mill, Burnley. It was re-erected in 1983.

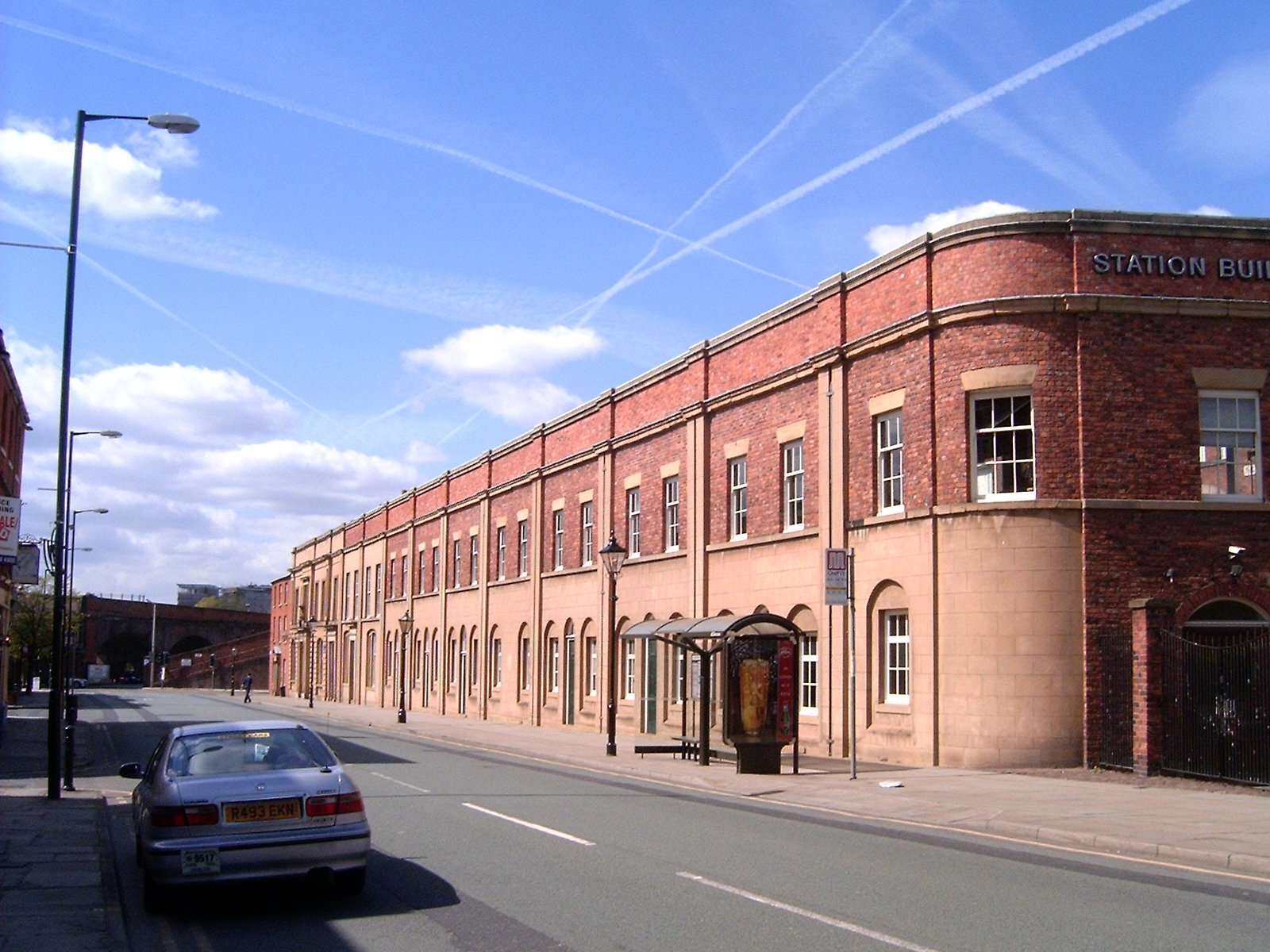
Manchester Liverpool Road railway station

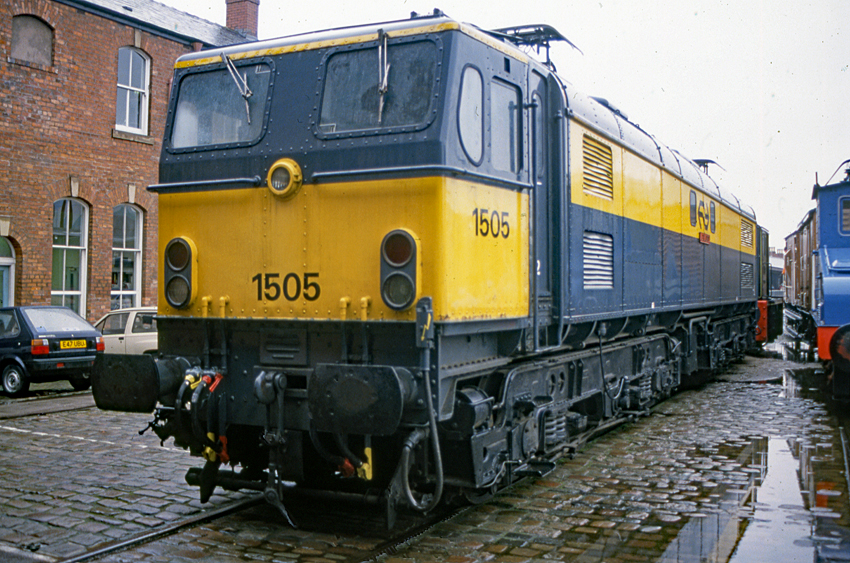
NS 1505 Ariadne outside the museum

Hills saw that the museum could complement the National Railway Museum by displaying locomotives that had been exported overseas. A cousin, Elspeth Quayle, who was a member of the Manx House of Keys, introduced him to their Minister of Transport and so was arranged the return to Manchester of the Beyer, Peacock-built Pender. The British Overseas Railways Historical Society helped with the return of a Vulcan Foundry 4-4-0 locomotive from Pakistan. Netherlands State Railways presented the high-speed electric EM2 Class Ariadne built at Gorton with Metropolitan-Vickers electrics. Hills also secured the repatriation of a South African Railways GL Class Garratt articulated locomotive; he visited South Africa to deal with the transport.

== Cleric ==
In 1983, Hills took early retirement on grounds of poor health, that year becoming a Fellow of the Museums Association. He trained to serve in the Church of England, studying at St Deiniol's Library. He was ordained deacon in 1987 and became a curate at Urmston. He was ordained priest in 1988. He moved to Great Yarmouth for a year in 1989, still as a curate. From 1990 to 2001 he was a non-stipendiary minister at Mottram in Longdendale.

Hills continued to write on the history of technology, and published a three volume biography of James Watt. Hills was also Honorary Reader in History of Science and Technology at UMIST.

== Publications ==
- Hills, Richard L. (1967). Machines, Mills and Uncountable Costly Necessities: A Short History of Drainage of the Fens.
- —— (1970). Power in the Industrial Revolution. Manchester University Press. ISBN 0719003776.
- —— (1973). Richard Arkwright and Cotton Spinning.
- —— (1982). Beyer-Peacock, Locomotive Builders to the World. with David Patrick
- —— (1988). Paper Making in Britain, 1488–1988: A Short History. reprinted 2015
- —— (1993). Power from Steam.
- —— (1993). Power from Wind: A History of Windmill Technology.
- —— (2000). The Origins of the Garratt Locomotive. Plateway Press. ISBN 1871980437.
- —— (2000). Windmills, A Pictorial History of Their Technology.
- —— (2002). James Watt: Volume 1: His time in Scotland, 1736–1774.
- —— (2002). Life and Inventions of Richard Roberts.
- —— (2003). The Drainage of the Fens.
- —— (2005). James Watt: Volume 2: His time in England, 1774–1815.
- —— (2006). James Watt: Volume 3: Triumph through Adversity, 1785–1819.

Hills also wrote numerous articles for journals and encyclopedic works.

== Offices, awards and honours ==
Hills held various positions in learned societies at various times:

- Manchester Literary and Philosophical Society – Member of Council, later (2014) an Honorary Member
- Manchester Region Industrial Archeology Society – chairman, Secretary, later an Honorary Member
- International Association of Paper Historians – President, later an Honorary Member
- British Association of Paper Historians – Founding President
- Newcomen Society for the History of Engineering – Member of Council, Chairman of the North West Branch
- Manchester Association of Engineers – Member of Council, Editor, President
- Society of Ordained Scientists – Secretary

Awards and honours included:

- Award of Merit, Cambridge Education Diploma
- Abbot Payson Usher Prize, 1973 (R. L. Mills and A. J. Pacey, "The Measurement of Power in the Early Steam-driven Textile Mills," Technology and Culture 13 (1972): 25–43)
- Companion of the Institution of Mechanical Engineers
- Honorary Life Vice-president, Museum of Science and Industry, Manchester
- Awarded Manchester University Medal of Honour (2014)

Hills was appointed Member of the Order of the British Empire (MBE) in the 2015 New Year Honours for services to industrial heritage.

== Family and last years ==
While working as curate at St Michael and All Angels Church, Mottram in Longdendale, Hills met Bernice Pickford and they were married there in August 2008. She died from cancer in 2016. After her death, as therapy, he was encouraged to write his autobiography, The Seven ages of One Man (published in 2018).

He was diagnosed with Parkinson's disease in 2011 and died on 10 May 2019, aged 82.
