= Caroline =

Caroline may refer to:

== People ==
- Caroline (singer) (born 1981), Japanese glitch pop musician
- Caroline (given name), a feminine given name
- J. C. Caroline (1933–2017), American football player
- Jamie Caroline (born 1999), British racing driver
- Jordan Caroline (born 1996), American basketball player
- Nancy Caroline (1944–2002), American-Israeli physician

== Places ==
=== Antarctica ===
- Caroline Bluff, a headland in the South Shetland Islands

=== Australia ===
- Caroline, South Australia, a locality in the District Council of Grant
- Hundred of Caroline, a cadastral sub-unit of the County of Grey in South Australia
- Caroline Springs, Victoria a town in Victoria

=== Canada ===
- Caroline, Alberta, a village

=== Kiribati ===
- Caroline Island, an uninhabited coral atoll in the central Pacific

=== Micronesia ===
- Caroline Islands an archipelago in the western Pacific, northeast of New Guinea
- Caroline Plate, a small tectonic plate north of New Guinea

=== United States ===
- Caroline, New York, a town
- Caroline, Ohio, an unincorporated community
- Caroline, Wisconsin, an unincorporated census-designated place
- Caroline County, Maryland
- Caroline County, Virginia
- Fort Caroline, the first French colony in what is now the United States
- Caroline Church and Cemetery, Setauket, New York

== Arts, entertainment, and media ==
=== Compositions and songs ===
- "La Caroline" (C. P. E. Bach), a classical solo piano piece by Carl Philipp Emanuel Bach
- "Caroline" (Aminé song), 2016
- "Caroline" (Status Quo song), 1973
- "Caroline" (Concrete Blonde song), 1990
- "Caroline" (The Badloves song), 1995
- "Caroline" (Kirsty MacColl song), 1995
- "Caroline" (Arlo Parks Song), 2020
- "Caroline" (MC Solaar song), 1992
- "Caroline", a 1964 song by The Fortunes
- "Caroline", a 1974 song by Jefferson Starship from Dragon Fly
- "Caroline", a 1987 song by Fleetwood Mac from Tango in the Night
- "Caroline", a 2006 song by Chicago from Chicago XXX
- "Caroline", a 2017 song by Steve Martin and the Steep Canyon Rangers
- "Caroline", a 2023 song by Conrad Sewell from Precious
- "Caroline", a 2025 song by Mumford & Sons from Rushmere

=== Other arts, entertainment, and media ===
- Caroline? (1990), a made-for-TV film
- Caroline, or Change, a musical with lyrics by Tony Kushner
- Caroline (play), also called The Unattainable, a comedy play by W. Somerset Maugham first performed in 1916
- Caroline Records, a record label
  - Caroline Distribution
- Radio Caroline, a UK radio station
- Caroline (band), a rock band from London, England

== Ships ==
- HMS Caroline, various ships of the British Royal Navy
- Caroline-class cruiser, a Royal Navy class of light cruisers, launched between 1914 and 1915
- French frigate Caroline (1806)
- French ship Caroline (1785)
- USS Caroline (SP-1105), a United States Navy patrol boat in commission from 1917 to 1918
- Caroline (ship), several other ships

== Airplane ==
- The Caroline was the name of the private jet used by JFK for his 1960 campaign

== Other uses ==
- Caroline Street (disambiguation), various streets
- Leblanc (automobile manufacturer) Caroline, a sports car
- List of storms named Caroline, various tropical cyclones
- 975025 Caroline, an inspection saloon operated in Great Britain, additionally used for VIPs
- The Caroline minuscule script, sometimes just "Caroline", also known as the Carolingian minuscule

== See also ==
- Carolines on Broadway, an American comedy club
- Caroline era, the common historical name for the reign of Charles I of England
- Coraline, a novella by Neil Gaiman
- Coraline (film), a 2009 film based on the novella
- Caroleans, soldiers of Charles XII of Sweden
- Karoline (disambiguation)
- Sweet Caroline (disambiguation)
