= Caroline (ship) =

A number of vessels were named Caroline:

- Caroline (1794 ship) was a ship launched in France in 1792, possibly under another name. She was taken in prize in 1794 and sailed first as a West Indiaman, then as a whaler, and finally as a slave ship. She was lost in 1801 on her second slave-trading voyage after she had delivered her slaves to Kingston, Jamaica.
- Caroline (1800 ship) was launched in 1799 or 1800 at Ipswich. She spent the first 40 years or so as a West Indiaman. She then spent the remainder of her career trading more widely, particularly with Quebec. She was last listed in 1864 with minimal data unchanged since 1859.
- Caroline (schooner), an American schooner that disappeared in 1802
- Caroline (1804 ship) was a French privateer commissioned in Saint-Malo in 1804. She served in the Indian Ocean, based at Mauritius. As she was returning to Saint-Malo, a British sloop captured her off Cape Finisterre in 1809; she was accidentally sunk shortly thereafter.
- Caroline (1804 Shoreham ship) was a merchant vessel launched at Shoreham as a West Indiaman. She spent almost her entire career sailing to the West Indies, and endured two maritime mishaps during that period, one at Sierra Leone. She sailed to Batavia in 1824 under a license from the British East India Company (EIC). From Batavia she sailed to Sincapore, where she was condemned.
- Caroline (1805 ship) was launched at Calcutta in 1805. She made one voyage for the British East India Company (EIC). Thereafter, she became a London-based transport, sailing between England and India under a license from the EIC. She was wrecked in 1816.
- Caroline (1800 Philadelphia ship) was launched at Philadelphia in 1800. She was taken in prize. New owners retained her name and she appeared in British records from 1813. From 1820 on she was based at Hobart in Van Diemen's Land. From there she sailed to and from Port Jackson and on seal hunting voyages to Macquarie Island. She departed on a sealing voyage in November 1824 and wrecked at Macquarie Island in March 1825; her crew were rescued some five months later.
- Caroline (1825 ship) was built at Cochin, British India, in 1825. She sailed to the United Kingdom and took up British registry. She then sailed between England and India under a license from the British East India Company (EIC). She made one voyage transporting convicts from Ireland to Australia. Later, she carried immigrants to Australia. She was wrecked in March 1850.
- Caroline (1827) was launched at Nursapore. Her early career as a country ship, trading east of the Cape of Good Hope, is currently obscure. From 1834 on she proceeded to make six voyages as a whaler in the British Southern Whale Fishery. She disappeared from online records after her return to Great Britain in 1859.
- Caroline, of Hobart, Smith, master, foundered at Tonga 24 March 1831 while on a whaling voyage.
- Caroline (steamboat), Great Lakes steamer destroyed in 1837, triggering the Caroline Affair
- Caroline a coastal cargo schooner built in 1845. She was lost off Broken Bay, during a gale in July 1860.
- Caroline, a Schleswig-Holstein brig captured by the Prussian frigate Gazelle during the Second Schleswig War
- Caroline, a blockade runner for the Confederate States of America, later USS Arizona
- Caroline, a 1931-built motor yacht, later the tender USS Hilo

== See also ==
- French ship Caroline
- HMS Caroline
- USS Caroline
