= List of ship launches in 1827 =

The list of ship launches in 1827 includes a chronological list of some ships launched in 1827.

Date	Ship	Class	Builder	Location	Country	Notes
2 January	Dauntless	Schooner	Nichol, Reid & Co.	Aberdeen	United Kingdom	For private owner.
9 January	Carron	Alban-class paddle steamer		Deptford Dockyard	United Kingdom	For Royal Navy.
27 January	Thorn	Mersey flat	George Stringer & Co.	Northwich	United Kingdom	For private owner.
30 January	Crusader	Steamship	Graham	Harwich	United Kingdom	For Post Office Packet Service.
30 January	Duke of Gordon	Packet ship	Nicol, Reid & Co.	Aberdeen	United Kingdom	For private owner.
30 January	Sapphire	Sapphire-class sloop		Portsmouth Dockyard	United Kingdom	For Royal Navy.
January	Stansfield	Merchantman	G. Gowland	Sunderland	United Kingdom	For private owner.
11 February	Actéon	Cygne-class Brig		Lorient	France	For French Navy.
12 February	Adonis	Cygne-class brig		Toulon	France	For French Navy.
12 February	Aventure	Gazelle-class schooner		Toulon	France	For French Navy.
24 February	Unnamed	Diving support vessel	Wake & Sissons	Hull	United Kingdom	For Hull Dock Company.
27 February	Gledstanes	West Indiaman	Anderson	Leith	United Kingdom	For private owner.
28 February	Margaret	Schooner	Menzies & Sons	Leith	United Kingdom	For private owner.
February	Abdiel	Brig	W. Sanderson	Sunderland	United Kingdom	For J. Riden.
February	Echo	Merchantman		Bideford	United Kingdom	For private owner.
February	John & Mary	Merchantman	J. Storey	Sunderland	United Kingdom	For J. Storey.
February	Vesta	Merchantman	John M. & William Gales	Sunderland	United Kingdom	For George Thompson.
February	Wye	Sloop			United Kingdom	For private owner.
4 March	Chalonaise	Steamboat		Lyon	France	For Gaillard et Cie.
4 March	Lyonnaise	Steamboat		Lyon	United Kingdom	For Gaillard et Cie.
8 March	Natchez	Lexington-class sloop		Norfolk Naval Shipyard	United States	For United States Navy.
14 March	Rhine	Brig	S. S. Walton	Hull	United Kingdom	For Depledge, Fressick & Co.
15 March	Ripleys	Brig	Lomax and Wilson	Tranmer	United Kingdom	For Thomas and Henry Ripley.
27 March	Albion	Sloop	Anderson	Leith	United Kingdom	For private owner.
28 March	Confiance	Alban-class paddle steamer		Woolwich Dockyard	United Kingdom	For Royal Navy.
30 March	Cerberus	Leda-class frigate		Portsmouth Dockyard	United Kingdom	For Royal Navy.
March	Agrippina	Paddle steamer	Smit	Alblasserdam	Netherlands	For Preußisch-Rheinische Dampfschiffahrts-Gesellschaft.
March	Jane	Schooner		Hull	United Kingdom	For private owner.
9 April	Mermaid	Sloop	Rose & Son	Leith	United Kingdom	For private owner.
11 April	William and Ann	Brig	MacNelland and Mustard	Alloa	United Kingdom	For private owner.
12 April	Queen of Scotland	Paddle steamer	Duffus & Co.	Aberdeen	United Kingdom	For Aberdeen Steam Navigation Company.
13 April	John and Margaret	Schooner	Rose & Son	Leith	United Kingdom	For William Ross.
13 April	Minx	Brig	Sime	Leith	United Kingdom	For private owner.
16 April	Erivan	Erivan-class brig	S. O. Burachek	Astrakhan	Russia	For Imperial Russian Navy.
April	Henry	Brig		Saint John	(United Kingdom of Great Britain and Ireland) Colony of New Brunswick	For private owner.
1 May	City of Bristol	Steamship	G. Hilhouse & Co.	Bristol	United Kingdom	For private owner.
3 May	Iphigénie	Frigate		Toulon	France	For French Navy.
10 May	Flora	Schooner	William Bayley	Ipswich	United Kingdom	For John Roberts.
10 May	Rashid	Fourth rate		Venice	Austrian Empire	For Egyptian Navy.
12 May	Nandi	Full-rigged ship	Bland and Chaloner	Liverpool	United Kingdom	For W. F. Potter.
12 May	Terpsichore	Fourth rate	Philippe-Jacque Moreau	Brest	France	For French Navy.
15 May	Pomona	Merchantman	G. W. Porritt	Scarborough	United Kingdom	For Charles Reed and Mark Whitwell.
19 May	Protector	Barque	John Richard Portelos	Lincoln	(United Kingdom of Great Britain and Ireland) Colony of New Brunswick	For private owner.
26 May	Therese	Yacht	Joseph White	Cowes	United Kingdom	For private owner.
27 May	Sardar Abad	Erivan-class brig	S. O. Burachek	Astrakhan	Russia	For Imperial Russian Navy.
27 May	Tavriz	Erivan-class brig	S. O. Burachek	Astrakhan	Russia	For Imperial Russian Navy.
28 May	Echo	Alban-class paddle steamer		Woolwich Dockyard	United Kingdom	For Royal Navy.
11 June	John and Mary	Brig	John Thomas	Llanelly	United Kingdom	For private owner.
14 June	Emily	Schooner	William Bayley	Ipswich	United Kingdom	For private owner.
25 June	Hussard	Cygne-class brig		Rochefort	France	For French Navy.
26 June	Dapper	Brig	Gleadow	Hull	United Kingdom	For private owner.
June	Hercules	Paddle tug		Boom	Netherlands	For Nederlandsche Stoomboot Maatschappij.
12 July	Edith	Schooner		Northam	United Kingdom	For Mr. Oake.
18 July	Charlotte	Smack	William Bayley	Ipswich	United Kingdom	For private owner.
19 July	Don Pedro	Brig of war		Lisbon	Portugal	For Portuguese Navy.
25 July	Clarence	Canopus-class ship of the line		Pembroke Dockyard	United Kingdom	For Royal Navy.
25 July	Earl of Erroll	Brig	Duthie	Aberdeen	United Kingdom	For private owner.
25 July	Garland	Schooner	Thornton	Aberdeen	United Kingdom	For private owner.
July	Aquila	Schooner	John M. & William Gales	Sunderland	United Kingdom	For Craig & Co.
July	Canning	Brig	Wilkinson	Sunderland	United Kingdom	For private owner.
July	Melby	Brig			United Kingdom	For Mr. Scott.
9 August	Admiral Moorsom	Full-rigged ship	Longburn & Co.	Whitby	United Kingdom	For private owner.
9 August	Pomona	Schooner	Roberts	Milford Haven	United Kingdom	For private owner.
10 August	Williams	Schooner	William Blair	Arbroath	United Kingdom	For private owner.
16 August	Abbas Abad	Erivan-class brig	S. O. Burachek	Astrakhan	Russia	For Imperial Russian Navy.
20 August	Stag	Cutter		Cowes	United Kingdom	For Board of Customs.
23 August	Champion	Schooner		Northam	United Kingdom	For private owner.
23 August	Childers	Snake-class sloop		Chatham Dockyard	United Kingdom	For Royal Navy.
25 August	Gypsy	Brig	Bolton & Humphrey	Hull	United Kingdom	For private owner.
August	Charles	Ballast lighter			United Kingdom	For private owner.
August	De Batavier	Paddle steamer	L. Smit en Zoon	Nieuw-Lekkerland	Netherlands	For Nederlandsche Stoomboot Maatschappij.
August	Medea	Pallas-class frigate		Venice	Austrian Empire	For Austrian Navy.
August	Stadt Frankfurt	Paddle steamer	Nederlandsche Stoomboot Maatschappij	Ijsselmonde	Netherlands	For Dampfschiffarts-Gesellschaft von Rhein und Main.
21 September	William and Mary	Sloop	McClellan	Kelton	United Kingdom	For William Turner.
22 September	Circe	Leda-class frigate		Plymouth Dockyard	United Kingdom	For Royal Navy.
22 September	Royal George	Caledonia-class ship of the line		Chatham Dockyard	United Kingdom	For Royal Navy.
24 September	Thetis	East Indiaman	Gibson	Hull	United Kingdom	For private owner.
September	Four Brothers	Steamship			United Kingdom	For private owner.
5 October	Badine	Gazelle-class schooner		Bayonne	France	For French Navy.
5 October	Thistle	Smack	L. Rose & Son	Leith	United Kingdom	For private owner.
6 October	Pigeon	Cherokee-class brig-sloop		Pembroke Dockyard	United Kingdom	For Royal Navy.
6 OCtober	Resina	Schooner	William Roberts	Hubberston Pill	United Kingdom	For private owner.
6 October	Spey	Cherokee-class brig-sloop		Pembroke Dockyard	United Kingdom	For Royal Navy.
6 October	United Friends	Smack	William Roberts	Hubberston Pill	United Kingdom	For private owner.
6 October	Variable	Cherokee-class brig-sloop		Pembroke Dockyard	United Kingdom	For Royal Navy.
15 October	George and John	Merchantman	Benson	Doncaster	United Kingdom	For George Hastings.
22 October	Lady Rowena	Passenger ship	J. and R. Fisher	Liverpool	United Kingdom	For Mr. Lodge.
27 October	Voltigeur	Cygne-class brig		Rochefort	United Kingdom	For French Navy.
October	George Canning	Full-rigged ship			United Kingdom	For private owner.
October	James	Brig			Unknown	For private owner.
3 November	Falmouth	Sloop of war		Boston Navy Yard	United States	For United States Navy.
3 November	Reliance	East Indiaman	Thames Shipbuilding Co.	Deptford	United Kingdom	For British East India Company.
November	Ada Bella or Adahbella	Snow	John M. Gales	Sunderland	United Kingdom	For private owner.
November	Al-Buhayra	Fourth rate		Marseille	France	For Egyptian Navy.
November	Annabella	Full-rigged ship		Gaspé	(United Kingdom of Great Britain and Ireland) Upper Canada	For private owner.
19 December	Delta	Brig	Syme & Rankin	Leith	United Kingdom	For Syme & Rankin.
20 December	Africaine	Seringapatam-class frigate		Chatham Dockyard	United Kingdom	For Royal Navy.
Autumn	Jane	Brigantine			Unknown	For private owner.
Unknown date	Acorn	Snow	James Leithead	Sunderland	United Kingdom	For Wilkinson & Co.
Unknown date	Adahlina or Adahline	Snow	John M. & William Gales	Sunderland	United Kingdom	For William Gales.
Unknown date	Adams	Merchantman		Sunderland	United Kingdom	For private owner.
Unknown date	Amelia	Schooner		Sunderland	United Kingdom	For private owner.
Unknown date	Brunswick	Merchantman		Maine	United States	For private owner.
Unknown date	Caroline	Merchantman		Nursapore	India	For private owner.
Unknown date	Catherine & Hannah	Merchantman	James Leithead	Sunderland	United Kingdom	For private owner.
Unknown date	Cheviot	Merchantman	Philip Laing	Sunderland	United Kingdom	For Philip Laing.
Unknown date	Content	Merchantman	John M. & William Gales	Sunderland	United Kingdom	For John M. & William Gales.
Unknown date	Coote	Sloop-of-war		Bombay Dockyard	India	For British East India Company.
Unknown date	Countess of Lonsdale	Paddle steamer	T. & J. Brocklebank	Whitehaven	United Kingdom	For T. & J. Brocklebank.
Unknown date	Courier	Schooner			United Kingdom	For private owner.
Unknown date	Crown	Merchantman		Sunderland	United Kingdom	For private owner.
Unknown date	Cumberland	Merchantman	C. C. Poney Guizelar	Cochin	India	For Steele, Lambden & Co.
Unknown date	Curlew	Merchantman		Sunderland	United Kingdom	For private owner
Unknown date	Cygnet	Barque	John Gilmore & Co.	Sulkea	India	For private owner.
Unknown date	Echo	Full-rigged ship		Rotterdam	Netherlands	For Royal Netherlands Navy.
Unknown date	Eclipse	Schooner		Sunderland	United Kingdom	For private owner.
Unknown date	Fethiye	Second rate		Gemlik	Ottoman Empire	For Ottoman Navy.
Unknown date	Governor Fenner	Merchantman		Massachusetts	United States	For private owner.
Unknown date	Hawthorn	Snow	T. Ogden	Sunderland	United Kingdom	For T. Ogden.
Unknown date	Henry	Merchantman	Philip Laing	Sunderland	United Kingdom	For Laing & Christie.
Unknown date	Isabella	Barque	T. Barrick	Whitby	United Kingdom	For Nelson & Co.
Unknown date	John & Ann	Merchantman	J. Dryden	Sunderland	United Kingdom	For Mr. Collingwood.
Unknown date	Justinian	Snow	Kirkbride & Co.	Sunderland	United Kingdom	For private owner.
Unknown date	Latona	Merchantman	John M. & William Gales	Sunderland	United Kingdom	For William Gales.
Unknown date	Leije	Sixth rate			Netherlands	For Royal Netherlands Navy.
Unknown date	Liddell	Merchantman	John M. and William Gales	Sunderland	United Kingdom	For R. Scurfield.
Unknown date	Lord Farnham	Merchantman	William Gales	Sunderland	United Kingdom	For John White.
Unknown date	Mary Hall	Schooner		Sunderland	United Kingdom	For private owner.
Unknown date	Matilda	Snow		Sunderland	United Kingdom	For private owner.
Unknown date	Medusa	Sixth rate			Netherlands	For Royal Netherlands Navy.
Unknown date	Messenger of Peace	Schooner	John Williams	Rarotonga	(United Kingdom of Great Britain and Ireland) Cook Islands	For London Missionary Society.
Unknown date	Nadir	Schooner	John Ball Jr.	Salcombe	United Kingdom	For John Ball.
Unknown date	Nehalennia	Sixth rate		Vlissingen	Netherlands	For Royal Netherlands Navy.
Unknown date	Oak	Merchantman	James Leithead	Sunderland	United Kingdom	For Dawson & Co.
Unknown date	Oculus	Snow	John M. & William Gales	Sunderland	United Kingdom	For John M. & William Gales.
Unknown date	Orestes	Steamship	"Netherlands Steam-packet Company"		Netherlands	For Dutch Government.
Unknown date	Philemon	Schooner	Frederick Baddeley	Brixham	United Kingdom	For Frederick & John Baddeley.
Unknown date	Pylades	Steamship	"Netherlands Steam-packet Company"		Netherlands	For Dutch Government.
Unknown date	Rainbow	Brig	Wilkinson	Sunderland	United Kingdom	For P. Austin.
Unknown date	Thames	Steamship	Fletcher	Limehouse	United Kingdom	For City of Dublin Steam Packet Company.
Unknown date	William	Merchantman	Philip Laing	Sunderland	United Kingdom	For Mr. Rann.
Unknown date	William & Isabella	Snow		Sunderland	United Kingdom	For private owner.
