= Benson (ship) =

Several ships have been named Benson:

- Benson (1794 ship) was launched in Liverpool as a West Indiaman. She sailed under a letter of marque and in December 1798 engaged in a notable single-ship action in which she repelled an attack by a French naval corvette of superior force. Benson was wrecked on 23 March 1811.
- Benson (1811 ship) was launched at Quebec. She entered Lloyd's Register (LR) in 1813. She was condemned at Mauritius in 1817 and her loss gave rise to a notable court case.
