= Elizabeth (1813 ship) =

History

United Kingdom
- Name: Elizabeth
- Owner: 1813:John Barksworth; c.1823:Brooks & Co.
- Builder: Barkworth & Hawkes, Hessle, Hull
- Launched: 21 January 1813
- Fate: Last listed in 1841

General characteristics
- Type: Ship
- Tons burthen: 362, or 363 (bm)
- Propulsion: Sail
- Armament: 6 × 6-pounder guns + 8 × 12-pounder carronades

Elizabeth was launched at Hull in 1813. She made one round-trip to Bengal for the British East India Company (EIC). She was last listed in 1841.

== Career ==
Elizabeth appears in Lloyd's Register for 1813 with T. Forest, master, Barkworth, owner, and trade Hull—West Indies.

EIC voyage: Captain Thomas Forrest sailed for Bengal on 22 May 1815 on a voyage for the EIC. He returned on 19 November 1816.

On 17 February 1817 Forest again sailed for India, this time for Bombay, and under a license from the EIC.

Elizabeth, Forest, master, arrived at Île de France on 23 June. There she and Cadmus took on the undamaged cargo from Benson, 500 bags of sugar and 179 chests of indigo. Benson had been sailing from Bengal to London when she had had to put into Île de France leaky. There she had been surveyed and condemned.

On 15 January 1821 Elizabeth, Forest, master, had to put into Kinsale to unload. She had been on a voyage from Quebec, to London but had sustained damage and was leaky.

In the early 1920s Barkworth sold Elizabeth to Brooks & Co., London. They then sailed her between England and Australia.

Elizabeth arrived at the Cape of Good Hope on 6 April 1826 on a voyage from Singapore to London. She had sailed on 1 February 1826 and in 11°S 106°E she encountered James Scott, which had lost her mainmast, rudder, and boats. She had also had to jettison some of her cargo and put back to Batavia. Elizabeth had stayed with James Scott for three days and left her with her rudder shipped and pumps working.

Year	Master	Owner	Trade
1815	T. Forrest	Barkworth	London—Île de France
1820	T. Forrest; J. Pixley	Barkworth	London—Ceylon; London—Jamaica
1825	T. Collins	Brooks	London—New South Wales
1830	T. Collins	Brooks	London—New South Wales
1833	T. Collins	Brooks	London—New South Wales
1835			No entry
1840			No entry
1841	T. Evans; G. Bruce	H. Castle	London—Bermuda; London

== Fate ==
Elizabeth is last listed in 1841. She is listed in 1842, but the entry is incomplete and struck out.
