= French ship Caroline =

Several ships of the French Navy have borne the name Caroline:

- French ship Caroline (1785)
- French frigate Caroline (1806)

== See also ==
- Caroline (ship)
