= List of shipwrecks in March 1850 =

The list of shipwrecks in March 1850 includes ships sunk, foundered, wrecked, grounded, or otherwise lost during March 1850.

== 1 March ==
List of shipwrecks: 1 March 1850
Ship	State	Description
Britain	United Kingdom	The ship was wrecked near Musquash, New Brunswick, British North America. Her crew were rescued. She was on a voyage from Saint John, New Brunswick to Trinidad.
Esther	United Kingdom	The sloop was wrecked on the Goodwin Sands, Kent. Her crew were rescued. She was on a voyage from Dunkirk, Nord, France to Rochester, Kent.
Miranda	United Kingdom	The ship departed from São Miguel Island, Azores for London. No further trace, presumed foundered with the loss of all hands.
Norfolk	United Kingdom	The steamship ran aground on the Hinder Bank, in the North Sea off the Dutch coast. She was on a voyage from Goole, Yorkshire to Rotterdam, South Holland, Netherlands.

== 2 March ==
List of shipwrecks: 2 March 1850
Ship	State	Description
Dart	United Kingdom	The ship spang a leak and foundered in the North Sea off Sunderland, County Durham. Her crew were rescued. She was on a voyage from Whitby, Yorkshire to Newcastle upon Tyne, Northumberland.
Edward Marie	United Kingdom	The ship departed from Liverpool, Lancashire for Batavia, Netherlands East Indies. Presumed subsequently foundered. Wreckage from the ship was discovered off Bray, County Wicklow on 4 April.
Exquisite	United Kingdom	The ship sank off Skagen, Denmark. Her crew were rescued by Egness (Denmark). Exquisite was on a voyage from Sunderland to Helsingør, Denmark.
Lincoln	United States	The brig was struck by lightning in the Atlantic Ocean (3°20′N 24°30′W) and was set afire. She was abandoned on 5 March. Her crew were rescued by the full-rigged ship Maria Christina (Denmark). Lincoln was on a voyage from Boston, Massachusetts to San Francisco, California.
Mary Ann	United Kingdom	The ship ran aground on the Whitton Sand and capsized with the loss of a crew member. She was on a voyage from Goole, Yorkshire to Ipswich, Suffolk.
Melville	United Kingdom	The sloop ran aground on the Gore Patch Sand. She was on a voyage from London to Hastings, Sussex. She was refloated and taken in to Margate, Kent in a sinking condition.
Native	United Kingdom	The brig was wrecked off Spiekeroog, Kingdom of Hanover. Her crew were rescued. She was on a voyage from Seaham, County Durham to Hamburg.
Queen of Scotland	Hamburg	The full-rigged ship ran aground on the Holme Sands, in the North Sea off the coast of Lincolnshire, United Kingdom. She was refloated and towed in to Hull, Yorkshire, United Kingdom.
Wave	(United Kingdom of Great Britain and Ireland) New South Wales	The schooner was driven ashore and wrecked near Newcastle. Her crew were rescued.

== 3 March ==
List of shipwrecks: 3 March 1850
Ship	State	Description
Ann	United Kingdom	The schooner struck a sunken object and sank in the River Tyne at Stanhope Drops, County Durham.
Brilliant	United Kingdom	The ship was driven ashore by ice at Galaţi, Ottoman Empire.
British Merchant	United Kingdom	The full-rigged ship ran aground at South Shields, County Durham. She was refloated.
Cadiz Packet	United Kingdom	The ship was driven ashore by ice at Galaţi.
Despatch	United Kingdom	The sloop ran aground on the Covesea Rocks, off the coast of Moray. She was on a voyage from Inverness to Lossiemouth, Moray. She was refloated and resumed her voyage.
Diana	United Kingdom	The ship was wrecked off the mouth of the River Spey. Her crew were rescued. She was on a voyage from Dundee, Forfarshire to Dublin.
Princess Royal	United Kingdom	The ship ran aground at Porthcawl, Glamorgan. She was refloated on 10 March.
Susannah	United Kingdom	The ship was driven ashore by ice at Galaţi.

== 4 March ==
List of shipwrecks: 4 March 1850
Ship	State	Description
Aimable Eulalie	United Kingdom	The steamship struck a rock 5 nautical miles (9.3 km) off "Porthcall", capsized and sank. Her crew were rescued. She was on a voyage from Honfleur, Calvados to Saint-Pierre-d'Oleron.
Barbara Ann	United Kingdom	The ship was driven ashore and severely damaged at Warkworth, Northumberland.
Briton	United Kingdom	The ship was driven ashore and wrecked at Lindisfarne, Northumberland. She was on a voyage from Newcastle upon Tyne, Northumberland to Dundee, Forfarshire.
Chance	United Kingdom	The ship was driven ashore and wrecked at Mundesley, Norfolk.
Dart	United Kingdom	The ship sprang a leak and foundered in the North Sea off Sunderland, County Durham. Her crew were rescued. She was on a voyage from Whitby, Yorkshire to Newcastle upon Tyne, Northumberland.
Francis	United Kingdom	The ship ran aground at Tralee, County Kerry.
Royalist	United Kingdom	The ship ran aground in the Isles of Scilly. She was on a voyage from Alexandria, Egypt to Southampton, Hampshire. She was refloated and taken in to harbour.
Sea Lark	United Kingdom	The ship ran aground at Tralee.
Two Friends	United Kingdom	The ship was driven ashore 5 nautical miles (9.3 km) south of Bridlington, Yorkshire. She was on a voyage from London to South Shields, County Durham. She was refloated and taken in to Bridlington.

== 5 March ==
List of shipwrecks: 5 March 1850
Ship	State	Description
Albion	Sweden	The ship was wrecked at Lønstrup, Denmark with the loss of four of her crew. She was on a voyage from Pernambuco, Brazil to Gothenburg.
Dwina	Rostock	The schooner ran aground on the Trindelen Rock and was abandoned by her crew, who were rescued by Gazelle (United Kingdom). Dwina was subsequently driven ashore at Särö, Sweden. She was on a voyage from Hull, Yorkshire, United Kingdom to Rostock.
Electra	United Kingdom	The ship was wrecked on reefs in Grand Lerera Bay, Granada.
Erin	United Kingdom	The ship ran aground at Teignmouth, Devon. She was refloated the next day and proceeded on her voyage.
Gesina Jantina	Netherlands	The ship was driven ashore at Busum, Duchy of Schleswig and was abandoned by her crew. She was on a voyage from Amsterdam, North Holland to Hamburg.
Isabella	United Kingdom	The ship was abandoned off Margate, Kent. Her crew were rescued. She was on a voyage from Harwich, Essex to Liverpool, Lancashire. She was subsequently taken in to Margate in a waterlogged condition.
Justus Frederick	Kingdom of Hanover	The schooner was driven ashore at the Point of Tortora, Spain and was abandoned by her crew. She was on a voyage from Newcastle upon Tyne, Northumberland, United Kingdom to Barcelona, Spain.
Trident	United Kingdom	The steamship was damaged by fire at London.

== 6 March ==
List of shipwrecks: 6 March 1850
Ship	State	Description
Aln	United Kingdom	The ship was wrecked 2 nautical miles (3.7 km) west of Skagen, Denmark. Her crew were rescued. She was on a voyage from Sunderland, County Durham to Stettin.
Chaffey	(United Kingdom of Great Britain and Ireland) British North America	The ship ran aground on reefs in Whitehall Bay, Nevis. She was on a voyage from Saint Andrew, New Brunswick to Barbados and Saint Martin. She was consequently condemned.
Fanny	United Kingdom	The schooner ran aground on the Whitby Rock. She was refloated and resumed her voyage.
Jenny	United Kingdom	The schooner ran aground on the Whitby Rock. She was refloated and resumed her voyage.
Maria	France	The brig was driven ashore 2 nautical miles (3.7 km) west of Dénia, Spain. Her crew survived
Rose	United Kingdom	The whaler ran aground at Grimsby, Lincolnshire. She was on a voyage from Grimsby to Greenland. She was refloated on 10 March and resumed her voyage.

== 7 March ==
List of shipwrecks: 7 March 1850
Ship	State	Description
Nimrod	Duchy of Holstein	The ship ran aground in the Elbe and was damaged. She was on a voyage from Ütersen, Duchy of Schleswig to Hull. She was refloated and taken in to Glückstadt, Duchy of Schleswig in a leaky condition.
Waterwitch	United Kingdom	The steamship ran aground on the Ware Rocks, on the north Devon coast and was severely damaged.

== 8 March ==
List of shipwrecks: 8 March 1850
Ship	State	Description
Black Eyed Susan	United Kingdom	The lugger was in collision with the barque Jane E. Williams (United States) and was severely damaged with the loss of a crew member. She put in to Plymouth, Devon.
Tay	United Kingdom	The schooner was in collision with Eagle (United Kingdom) and sank at Demerara, British Guiana with the loss of three or four lives.
Trois Frères	France	The ship was wrecked near Le Tréport, Seine-Inférieure. She was on a voyage from Havre de Grâce, Seine-Inférieure to London, United Kingdom.

== 9 March ==
List of shipwrecks: 9 March 1850
Ship	State	Description
Amity	United Kingdom	The ship was driven ashore on an island off the coast of Ayrshire. She was on a voyage from Newcastle upon Tyne, Northumberland to Dublin. She was refloated on 16 March and taken in to Ayr.
George	United Kingdom	The sloop was wrecked on the west coast of Sutherland with the loss of all hands.
Hermann	Prussia	The schooner was wrecked on Læsø, Denmark. Her crew were rescued.
Lawrence O'Connor Doyle	United Kingdom	The schooner struck a sunken rock and capsized 6 nautical miles (11 km) off the Isle of Lewis. Outer Hebrides with the loss of two of her crew. She was on a voyage from Liverpool to Apenrade, Denmark. The wreck was towed in to a creek near the Isle of Glass Lighthouse on 19 March.
Louise	Flag unknown	The schooner was holed by ice off Bolderāja, Russia and was abandoned by her crew.
Naomi Frances	United Kingdom	The ship was driven ashore and wrecked near Varberg, Sweden. her crew were rescued. She was on a voyage from Sunderland, County Durham to a Baltic port.
Occidente	Papal States	The ship departed from Gibraltar for London, United Kingdom. No further trace, presumed foundered with the loss of all hands.
Rosanna	United Kingdom	The brig was wrecked on the Manacles. Her crew were rescued. She was on a voyage from Sunderland to Alexandria, Egypt.
Vertumno	Hamburg	The brig was driven ashore on Scharhörn. She was on a voyage from Messina, Sicily to Hamburg. She was refloated with assistance from the steamship Elbe (Hamburg) and taken in to Cuxhaven.
Victoria	United Kingdom	The brig ran aground on the English Bank, in the River Plate and was wrecked. Her crew were rescued. She was on a voyage from Patagonia, Argentina to Montevideo, Uruguay.

== 10 March ==
List of shipwrecks: 10 March 1850
Ship	State	Description
Harvest	United Kingdom	The ship was twice driven ashore in Widewall Bay, Orkney Islands. She was on a voyage from Sunderland, County Durham to St. Andrews, Fife. She was refloated but drove ashore on Gromsay on 12 March. She was refloated on 16 March and put in to Stromness, Orkney Islands in a leaky condition.
Josephine	United Kingdom	The ship ran aground and was wrecked at Tampico, Mexico.
Rosina	France	The ship was wrecked near Læsø, Denmark. Her crew were rescued. She was on a voyage from Saint Petersburg, Russia to Nantes, Loire-Inférieure.

== 11 March ==
List of shipwrecks: 11 March 1850
Ship	State	Description
Afra	Netherlands	The ship was wrecked at Curaçao. She was on a voyage from La Guaira, Venezuela to Curaçao and Amsterdam, North Holland.
Anna	Spain	The ship capsized off Cape Bona, Algeria. Her crew were rescued. She was on a voyage from Cartagena to "St. Paula", Livorno, Grand Duchy of Tuscany, Genoa, Kingdom of Sardinia and Marseille, Bouches-du-Rhône, France.
Betsey	United Kingdom	The ship ran aground and sank on the Nash Sands, in the Bristol Channel with the loss of all hands.
Elizabeth	United Kingdom	The smack ran aground on the Nash Sand. She was on a voyage from Swansea, Glamorgan to Gloucester. She was refloated on 14 March and assisted in to Swansea for repairs.
Maria	United Kingdom	The ship ran aground off Skagen, Denmark. She was on a voyage from Montrose, Forfarshire to Memel, Prussia. She was refloated and put in to Helsingør, Denmark in a leaky condition.
Seagull	United Kingdom	The ship was wrecked on the coast of Cambodia. She was on a voyage from Singapore to "Kongpoot".

== 12 March ==
List of shipwrecks: 12 March 1850
Ship	State	Description
Ajax	United Kingdom	The ship was wrecked at Anjeer, Netherlands East Indies. Her crew were rescued. She was on a voyage from Manila, Spanish East Indies to London.
Burton	United Kingdom	The ship was holed by her anchor whilst on a voyage from Stettin to an English port. She consequently put in to Swinemünde, Prussia in a leaky condition.
Harlequin	Belgium	The ship ran aground off Point de Pierre, Haita. She was on a voyage from Gonaïves, Haiti to Antwerp. She was refloated on 19 March and resumed her voyage.
Isabella	United Kingdom	The ship was wrecked on a reef off Wangeroog, Kingdom of Hanover. Her crew were rescued. She was on a voyage from Newcastle upon Tyne, Northumberland to Hamburg.
Mary Stuart	United Kingdom	The ship ran aground near the "Rock of Tulchs", Ottoman Empire. She was refloated on 14 March and resumed her voyage.
Waters	United Kingdom	The ship ran aground on the Woolsteners, in the Solent. She was on a voyage from Sunderland, County Durham to Langstone, Hampshire. She was refloated on 14 March and taken in to Langstone.

== 13 March ==
List of shipwrecks: 13 March 1850
Ship	State	Description
Covenant	United Kingdom	The ship was driven ashore at "Princetown". She was on a voyage from Saint John, New Brunswick, British North America to New York, United States.
Humber	United Kingdom	The schooner was driven ashore and wrecked at Husby Klit, Denmark with the loss of all hands.
Jane	United Kingdom	The schooner was wrecked on Marshall's Island, off Isle au Haut, Maine, United States with the loss of four lives. She was on a voyage from Weymouth, Nova Scotia, British North America to Boston, Massachusetts, United States.
John Botcherley	United Kingdom	The ship ran aground in the River Wear. She was on a voyage from South Shields, County Durham to London. She was refloated and resumed her voyage.

== 14 March ==
List of shipwrecks: 14 March 1850
Ship	State	Description
Anna Elizabeth	Netherlands	The ship was driven ashore at Dungeness, Kent, United Kingdom. She was on a voyage from Amsterdam, North Holland to the Clyde and Surinam. She was refloated and resumed her voyage.
Argo	United States	The ship was driven ashore on Fire Island, New York. She was on a voyage from Havre de Grâce, Seine-Inférieure, France to New York City.
Edward	United Kingdom	The sloop ran aground on the Herd Sand, in the North Sea off the coast of County Durham. Her crew were rescued by a coble. She was on a voyage from Port Glasgow, Renfrewshire to South Shields, Count Durham.
Halcyon	United States	The barque was driven ashore at Point Lessiur, near Gonaïves, Haiti.
James W. Andrews	United States	The ship ran aground on the Nantucket Shoal, off the coast of Massachusetts. She was on a voyage from London, United Kingdom to Boston, Massachusetts. She was refloated and completed her voyage.
John and Henry	United Kingdom	The ship was driven ashore and wrecked at Charlestown, Cornwall.
Thomas	United Kingdom	The ship ran aground at Sunderland, County Durham. She was on a voyage from Sunderland to Colchester, Essex. She was refloated and resumed her voyage, but consequently put in to Hartlepool, County Durham in a leaky condition.

== 15 March ==
List of shipwrecks: 15 March 1850
Ship	State	Description
Cleddy	United Kingdom	The sloop was abandoned off the Tuskar Rock. She was towed in to Watchet, Somerset on 16 March by a Bristol pilot boat.
Edward	United Kingdom	The sloop ran aground and was wrecked at South Shields, County Durham. She was on a voyage from Berwick upon Tweed, Northumberland to South Shields.
Esther Ann	United Kingdom	The ship ran aground on the Olinda Reef, off the coast of Brazil. She was on a voyage from Maranhão, Brazil to Liverpool, Lancashire. She was refloated and put back to Maranhão.
Morning Star	United Kingdom	The ship was driven ashore at Arnold's Point, near Little Harbour, Nova Scotia, British North America. Her crew were rescued. She was on a voyage from Cardiff, Glamorgan to Wilmington, Delaware, United States. She had become a wreck by 3 April.
Trio	United Kingdom	The smack was in collision with Fame (United Kingdom) and sank in the Bristol Channel off Ilfracombe, Devon. Her crew were rescued.

== 16 March ==
List of shipwrecks: 16 March 1850
Ship	State	Description
Branch	United Kingdom	The schooner was driven ashore near Glettkau. Her crew were rescued. She was on a voyage from Kirkcaldy, Fife to Danzig. She was consequently condemned.
British King	United Kingdom	The ship ran aground on the Shoe Bank, in the North Sea off the coast of Forfarshire. She was on a voyage from Dundee, Forfarshire to Brazil. She was refloated and put back to Dundee.
Lord Douglas	United Kingdom	The ship ran aground at Poole, Dorset and was damaged. She was refloated and put back to Poole in a leaky condition.
Lycurgue	France	The steamship ran aground at Nagara Point, in the Dardanelles. She was refloated with assistance from Mecidiye (Ottoman Navy).
Naiad	United Kingdom	The ship was driven ashore at St. Ann's Head, Pembrokeshire. She was on a voyage from Dublin to Milford Haven, Pembrokeshire. She was refloated and taken in to Milford Haven.
Union	(United Kingdom of Great Britain and Ireland) Jersey	The ship was in collision with Fides (France) and was abandoned in the English Channel 22 nautical miles (41 km) off Barfleur, Manche, France. Her crew were rescued. She was on a voyage from Jersey to Livorno, Grand Duchy of Tuscany.
William and Jane	United Kingdom	The ship was driven ashore on the coast of Denmark. She was on a voyage from Newcastle upon Tyne, Northumberland to Stettin. She was refloated and taken in to Helsingør, Denmark in a leaky condition.

== 17 March ==
List of shipwrecks: March 1850
Ship	State	Description
Belhaven	United Kingdom	The barque was driven ashore and wrecked on Bali, Netherlands East Indies.
Charlotta Lætitia	Sweden	The barque was wrecked on Mayaguana, Bahamas. She was on a voyage from Cap-Haïtien, Haiti to Hamburg.
Johan Range	Netherlands	The ship was discovered derelict in the Dogger Bank. She was towed in to the Helvoet Canal.
Neptunus	Norway	The barque foundered in the Atlantic Ocean 80 nautical miles (150 km) off Cape St. Vincent, Portugal. Her twelve crew were rescued by the brig James and Elizabeth (United Kingdom). Neptunus was on a voyage from Newcastle upon Tyne, Northumberland, United Kingdom to Barcelona, Spain.
Rose	(United Kingdom of Great Britain and Ireland) Jersey	The schooner ran aground on the Kinderbalje. She was on a voyage from Hamburg to Jersey and Dublin. She was refloated and assisted in to Cuxhaven.

== 18 March ==
List of shipwrecks: 18 March 1850
Ship	State	Description
Dandie Dinmont	United Kingdom	The schooner was driven ashore on Bornholm, Denmark. Her crew were rescued. She was on a voyage from Newcastle upon Tyne, Northumberland to Memel, Prussia.
Esperance	(United Kingdom of Great Britain and Ireland) Guernsey	The ship was wrecked on the Small Rabbit, in the Channel Islands with some loss of life. There were fourteen survivors. She was on a voyage from Guernsey to Alderney, Channel Islands.
James	United Kingdom	The ship ran aground and was wrecked north of Bornholm. She was on a voyage from Sunderland, County Durham to Pillau, Prussia. She was later refloated and taken in to Rønne, where she was repaired.
Neptune	United Kingdom	The ship was abandoned in the Mediterranean Sea. Her crew were rescued. She was on a voyage from Newcastle upon Tyne to Barcelona, Spain.
Pilot	United Kingdom	The ship ran aground on the Inner Gabbard Sand. She was on a voyage from Sunderland, County Durham to Marseille, Bouches-du-Rhône, France. She put in to Portsmouth, Hampshire in a leaky condition.
Urania	Stettin	The ship ran aground on the Trindel Grounds, in the Baltic Sea. She floated off the next day but consequently sank. She was on a voyage from Middlesbrough, Yorkshire, United Kingdom to Stettin.

== 19 March ==
List of shipwrecks: 19 March 1850
Ship	State	Description
Eagle	United States	The schooner was wrecked on a reef near Cape Colville in New Zealand's Hauraki Gulf. Her crew were rescued. She was on a voyage from Auckland to San Francisco, Alta California.
Exporter	United Kingdom	The ship was in collision with Moselle (United Kingdom) and was then wrecked at Cantay Head, Caithness. She was on a voyage from Leith, Lothian to Saint John, New Brunswick.
Harmonie	Bremen	The ship ran aground on the Corton Sand, in the North Sea off the coast of Suffolk, United Kingdom. She was on a voyage from Bremen to London, United Kingdom. She was refloated and taken in to Lowestoft, Suffolk.
James	United Kingdom	The brig ran aground on the Hvideodde Reef, in the Baltic Sea. Her crew were rescued. She was on a voyage from Sunderland, County Durham to Pillau, Prussia.
James and Ann	United Kingdom	The ship was driven ashore and wrecked in the Ogmore River.
Mary Ann	United Kingdom	The ship ran aground on the Whitby Rock. She was on a voyage from Seaham, County Durham to London. She was refloated and taken in to Whitby, Yorkshire in a leaky condition.
Musica	United Kingdom	The ship was wrecked near Cape Bon, Beylik of Tunis. She was on a voyage from London to Constantinople, Ottoman Empire.
Renard	United Kingdom	The schooner ran aground on the Whitby Rock. She was refloated with the assistance of a coble and a steamboat and taken in to Whitby.

== 20 March ==
List of shipwrecks: 20 March 1850
Ship	State	Description
Cenna	Flag unknown	The ship was driven ashore at Gibraltar. She was on a voyage from Livorno, Grand Duchy of Tuscany to Barcelona, Spain. She was refloated on 23 March and taken in to Gibraltar in a leaky condition.
Clarence	United Kingdom	The ship was wrecked on the Castle Gordon Reef, off Port Maria, Jamaica. Her crew were rescued. She was on a voyage from Liverpool, Lancashire to New Orleans, Louisiana, United States.
Era, or Eva	United Kingdom	The ship foundered in the North Sea 14 nautical miles (26 km) off the Tynemouth Lighthouse. She was on a voyage from Newcastle upon Tyne, Northumberland to Rotterdam, South Holland, Netherlands.
Grand Duquesne	France	The full-rigged ship was wrecked in Cádiz Bay, Cuba. All on board were rescued. She was on a voyage from Matanzas, Cuba to Havre de Grâce, Seine-Inférieure.
Grand Mère	France	The ship ran aground on the Sunk Sand, in the North Sea off the coast of Essex, United Kingdom. She was refloated but consequently sank. Her crew were rescued. She was on a voyage from Hartlepool, County Durham, United Kingdom to L'Orient, Morbihan. Also reported as 1 March.
Janet Muir	United Kingdom	The ship was wrecked on the Stone Key, off the coast of Cuba. She was on a voyage from Newport, Monmouthshire to Havana, Cuba.
Lillias	United Kingdom	The ship ran aground on the High Sand, in the North Sea off the coast of Lincolnshire. She was on a voyage from Berwick upon Tweed, Northumberland to Hull, Yorkshire. She was refloated on 29 March and taken in to Hull.
Manuela	Chile	The ship sprang a leak and foundered in the Strait of Magellan. Her crew were rescued. She was on a voyage from Arica to Cork, United Kingdom.
Sir James Kent	United Kingdom	The ship was wrecked 8 leagues east of St. Jago de Cuba, Cuba. Her crew survived. She was on a voyage from the Rio de la Hacha to Saint Petersburg, Russia.
Sophie Elizabeth	Hamburg	The ship was driven ashore near Cuxhaven. She was on a voyage from La Guaira, Venezuela to Hamburg. She was refloated the next day and towed in to Altona.

== 21 March ==
List of shipwrecks: 21 March 1850
Ship	State	Description
Amphitrite	Bremen	The ship was wrecked on the Wittsand. She was on a voyage from Antwerp, Belgium to Hamburg.
Bella Rosa	Malta	The ship was driven ashore and wrecked at Bône, Algeria.
Christian and Johannes	Kingdom of Hanover	The ship departed from Leer for London, United Kingdom. No further trace, presumed foundered with the loss of all hands.
Isabella	United Kingdom	The brig was wrecked on Baltrum, Kingdom of Hanover. Her crew were rescued. She was on a voyage from Stockton on Tees, County Durham to Hamburg.
Liberty	United Kingdom	The ship ran aground off Scharhörn and was wrecked. Her crew were rescued. She was on a voyage from Seaham, County Durham to Hamburg.
Neb	(United Kingdom of Great Britain and Ireland) Isle of Man	The smack struck a sunken rock in the Sound of Mull and sank. She was on a voyage from Montrose, Forfarshire to Liverpool, Lancashire.
Romulus	United Kingdom	The ship ran aground off Scharhörn and was wrecked. Her crew were rescued. She was on a voyage from Stockton-on-Tees, County Durham to Hamburg.

== 22 March ==
List of shipwrecks: 22 March 1850
Ship	State	Description
Coaster	United Kingdom	The ship was in collision with Maxwell (United Kingdom) and was abandoned off the Farne Islands, Northumberland. Her crew were rescued by Maxwell. Coaster was on a voyage from Berwick upon Tweed, Northumberland to Great Yarmouth, Norfolk. She sank on 25 March.
Tite	United States	The ship was driven ashore and wrecked at Veracruz, Mexico.

== 23 March ==
List of shipwrecks: 23 March 1850
Ship	State	Description
Ancholm	United Kingdom	The sloop was driven ashore at Hemsby, Norfolk. She was on a voyage from Boston, Lincolnshire to Maldon, Essex. She floated off and was taken in to Great Yarmouth, Norfolk in a derelict condition.
Annette	Sweden	The brig foundered off North Ronaldsay, Orkney Islands, United Kingdom. She was on a voyage from Maruim, Brazil to Copenhagen, Denmark.
Dasher	United Kingdom	The ship ran aground and was wrecked off Bideford, Devon with the loss of a crew member. She was on a voyage from Hayle, Cornwall to Llanelly, Glamorgan.
Jupiter	United Kingdom	The ship was in collision with a schooner and was beached in the River Thames downstream of Gravesend, Kent. She was on a voyage from London to Constantinople, Ottoman Empire. She was refloated and towed back to London.
Mina	United Kingdom	The flat sank in the River Mersey. Her crew were rescued.
Nell	United Kingdom	The smack was driven ashore on the Goodwick Sands, Pembrokeshire. She was on a voyage from Newport, Monmouthshire to Aberystwyth, Cardiganshire. She was refloated on 28 March.
Return	(United Kingdom of Great Britain and Ireland) British North America	The schooner was wrecked at Mariel, Cuba. She was on a voyage from Havana, Cuba to Mariel.
Volant	United Kingdom	The ship was driven ashore at Liverpool, Lancashire. She was on a voyage from Saint Andrews, Fife to Liverpool. She was refloated and taken in to Liverpool.

== 24 March ==
List of shipwrecks: 24 March 1850
Ship	State	Description
Abraham	United Kingdom	The ship was driven ashore at Saltfleet, Lincolnshire. She was on a voyage from Wisbech, Cambridgeshire to Goole, Yorkshire.
Bellona	United Kingdom	The ship was driven ashore and wrecked on the Longscar Rocks, on the coast of County Durham. Her crew were rescued. She was on a voyage from Grangemouth, Stirlingshire to Stettin.
Friends	United Kingdom	The ship ran aground on the Gunfleet Sand, in the North Sea off the coast of Essex. She was on a voyage from London to Leith, Lothian. She was refloated and put in to Harwich, Essex in a leaky condition.
Highlandman	United Kingdom	The schooner was driven ashore and wrecked at Peterhead, Aberdeenshire. Her crew were rescued. She was on a voyage from Sunderland, County Durham to Port Gordon, Moray.
Margaretta	United Kingdom	The ship was beached on the Goodwick Sands, Pembrokeshire.
Tigress	United Kingdom	The brig foundered in the Swin, off the coast of Essex. Her crew were rescued by Henry and Mary (United Kingdom).

== 25 March ==
List of shipwrecks: 25 March 1850
Ship	State	Description
Howard	United Kingdom	The ship was driven ashore and broke her back at Southport, Lancashire with the loss of a crew member. Survivors were rescued by the Southport Lifeboat. She was on a voyage from Mobile, Alabama, United States to Liverpool, Lancashire.
Imperial	United Kingdom	The ship ran aground on the Krusker Reef and sank. Her crew were rescued. She was on a voyage from Port Gordon, Inverness-shire to Liverpool.

== 26 March ==
List of shipwrecks: 26 March 1850
Ship	State	Description
Caroline	(United Kingdom of Great Britain and Ireland) South Australia	The ship was driven ashore at Honolulu, Sandwich Islands with the loss of a crew member. She was on a voyage from South Australia to a port in Alta California.
Janet	United Kingdom	The ship sprang a leak in the Irish Sea. She was on a voyage from Belfast, County Antrim to Girvan, Ayrshire. She was towed in to Loch Ryan in a waterlogged condition by Ayrshire Lass.

== 27 March ==
List of shipwrecks: 27 March 1850
Ship	State	Description
Madura	Netherlands	The ship was abandoned in the Indian Ocean. All 35 people on board were rescued by Blanch (United Kingdom) and Columbus (United States). Madura was on a voyage from Batavia, Netherlands East Indies to Rotterdam, South Holland.
Phoenix	(United Kingdom of Great Britain and Ireland) New South Wales	The steamship was wrecked whilst on a voyage from Grafton to Sydney.

== 28 March ==
List of shipwrecks: 29 March 1850
Ship	State	Description
Robert and James	United Kingdom	The brig ran aground on the Barber Sand, in the North Sea off the coast of Norfolk. She was on a voyage from South Shields, County Durham to London. She was refloated and resumed her voyage.

== 29 March ==
List of shipwrecks: 29 March 1850
Ship	State	Description
Alert	United Kingdom	The ship was driven ashore and wrecked at Beaumaris, Anglesey. Her crew were rescued. She was on a voyage from Newport, Monmouthshire to Liverpool, Lancashire.
Alice and Ann	United Kingdom	The ship was driven ashore and severely damaged at Beaumaris.
Anne	United Kingdom	The ship collided with a lighter and sank at Dublin. She was on a voyage from Dublin to Liverpool. She was refloated on 1 April.
Anne and Mary	United Kingdom	The sloop was driven ashore at Beaumaris. She was refloated on 11 April.
Barbara	United Kingdom	The sloop was driven ashore and damaged at Beaumaris.
Betsy	United Kingdom	The ship was driven ashore and sank at Clee Ness, Lincolnshire. she was refloated and taken in to Grimsby, Lincolnshire.
Betty and Peggy	United Kingdom	The ship was driven ashore and severely damaged at Beaumaris.
Brothers	United Kingdom	The smack was driven ashore and damaged near Penmon, Anglesey with the loss of three lives. She was on a voyage from Liverpool to Caernarfon.
Burrell	United Kingdom	The barque was driven ashore near Ardglass, County Down. She was refloated on 3 April.
Cato	United Kingdom	The ship was driven ashore in Ballytrent Bay. She was on a voyage from Dunkirk, Nord to Liverpool.
Coromandel	United Kingdom	The ship was driven ashore and damaged at Beaumaris. She was on a voyage from Freetown, Sierra Leone to Liverpool.
Don Quixote	United Kingdom	The ship struck a sunken rock off St. David's Head, Pembrokeshire and was damaged. She was on a voyage from Marseille, Bouches-du-Rhône, France to Liverpool. She put in to Holyhead, Anglesey in a leaky condition.
Edouard Marie	France	The ship departed from Liverpool for Batavia, Netherlands East Indies. She subsequently foundered in the Irish Sea.
Emmet	United Kingdom	The ship was driven ashore at Beaumaris. She was on a voyage from Irwin to Hartlepool, County Durham. She was refloated on 3 April.
Enterprise	United Kingdom	The ship was driven ashore at Beaumaris. She was refloated on 11 April.
Finish	United Kingdom	The schooner was wrecked on the Collie Rock, off the coast of Aberdeenshire. Her three crew were rescued by the Macduff pilot boat.
George and Mary	United Kingdom	The ship was wrecked at Cantick Head, Orkney Islands. Her crew were rescued. She was on a voyage from Newcastle upon Tyne, Northumberland to Liverpool, Lancashire.
Guest	United Kingdom	The ship was driven ashore and damaged at Beaumaris. She was on a voyage from North Carolina, United States to Liverpool.
John	United Kingdom	The ship was driven ashore and severely damaged at Beaumaris. She was on a voyage from North Carolina, United States to Liverpool.
John and Mary	United Kingdom	The schooner was wrecked at Charlestown, Cornwall.
John and William	United Kingdom	The ship was driven ashore and wrecked at Beaumaris. Her crew were rescued. She was on a voyage from Newport to Liverpool.
Mars	United Kingdom	The schooner sank off Dunaff Head, County Londonderry. Her crew were rescued. She was on a voyage from Ballycastle, County Antrim to Londonderry.
Mary	United Kingdom	The ship was driven ashore and damaged at Beaumaris. Her crew were rescued She was on a voyage from Chester, Cheshire to Caernarfon.
Mary	United Kingdom	The schooner was driven ashore at Queenstown, County Cork. She was on a voyage from Queenstown to Llanelly, Glamorgan. She was refloated on 31 March.
Mercury	United Kingdom	The ship was driven ashore and severely damaged at Beaumaris. She was on a voyage from Cardiff, Glamorgan to Liverpool. She was refloated on 11 April.
Naiad	United Kingdom	The yacht was driven ashore and damaged at Beaumaris.
Nancy	United Kingdom	The ship was driven ashore and damaged on the coast of County Kerry. She was refloated on 31 March.
Otto	United Kingdom	The ship was driven ashore in Ballytrett Bay, County Wexford. She was on a voyage from Dunkirk to Liverpool.
Peggy	United Kingdom	The schooner was driven ashore near Cloghy, County Down with some loss of life. She was on a voyage from Liverpool to Aberdeen.
Robert and Mary	United Kingdom	The ship was driven ashore and severely damaged at Beaumaris. She was on a voyage from Cardiff to Liverpool.
Ruby	United Kingdom	The smack was driven ashore and wrecked on Sandycove Island, County Cork with the loss of all hands.
Sally	United Kingdom	The ship was driven ashore and wrecked at Lossiemouth, Inverness-shire.
Signette	United Kingdom	The brig was sunk by ice in the Atlantic Ocean with the loss of all on board. She was on a voyage from Alloa, Clackmannanshire to Quebec City, Province of Canada, British North America.
St. Jean	France	The ship was driven ashore and damaged at Beaumaris.
Vestal	United States	The ship ran aground on the Brigantine Shoals. She was on a voyage from Porto, Portugal to New York. She was refloated and resumed her voyage.
Victoria	United Kingdom	The ship was driven ashore at Beaumaris. She was refloated on 3 April.
William	United Kingdom	The flat was driven ashore and damaged at Beaumaris.
Wilton	United Kingdom	The ship was driven ashore and damaged at Beaumaris. She was refloated on 3 April and sailed for Liverpool.

== 30 March ==
List of shipwrecks: 30 March 1850
Ship	State	Description
Alexandrina	United Kingdom	The ship was driven ashore at Hartlepool, County Durham.
Amity	United Kingdom	The collier was driven ashore on the coast of County Durham.
Amsterdam	United Kingdom	The ship departed from Aarhus, Denmark for Portrush, County Antrim. No further trace, presumed foundered with the loss of all hands.
Ann	United Kingdom	The ship ran aground in the River Tees and was severely damaged. She was on a voyage from Fowey, Cornwall to Middleton, Hartlepool, County Durham.
Ariadne	United Kingdom	The ship was driven ashore and wrecked at Tynemouth, Northumberland. Her crew were rescued.
Atlas	United Kingdom	The brig was wrecked at Sunderland. Her crew were rescued.
Balmoral	United Kingdom	The ship ran aground and was damaged in the Solent. She was on a voyage from Guernsey, Channel Islands to London. She was refloated and put in to Portsmouth, Hampshire in a leaky condition.
Bee	United Kingdom	The schooner was driven ashore and severely damaged at Sunderland.
Branson	United Kingdom	The ship was driven ashore at Hartlepool.
Calthus	United Kingdom	The schooner was driven ashore and wrecked at Douglas, Isle of Man. Her crew were rescued. She was on a voyage from Chester, Cheshire to Thurso, Caithness.
Camille	France	The ship foundered with the loss of two of her seven crew. She was on a voyage from Bayonne, Basses-Pyrénées to Bristol, Gloucestershire, United Kingdom.
Caroline	(United Kingdom of Great Britain and Ireland) Jamaica	The sloop ran aground at Port Morant with the loss of seven lives. She was on a voyage from Port Morant to Kingston.
Catherine	United States	The ship foundered off the coast of Sutherland, United Kingdom. All hands presumed lost.
Cleadon	United Kingdom	The brig was driven ashore at Sunderland.
Cleopatra	Hamburg	The ship ran aground on the Half-ebb Rock, off Harwich, Essex, United Kingdom. She was on a voyage from Messina, Sicily to Hamburg.
Countess of Morley	United Kingdom	The ship was driven ashore at Hartlepool.
Cruizer	United Kingdom	The ship was driven ashore and severely damaged at Hartlepool. She was refloated on 15 April and taken in to Hartlepool.
Daubur	Stettin	The ship was driven ashore at Hartlepool.
Earl of Arran	United Kingdom	The smack was driven ashore and wrecked in Church Bay, County Antrim. Her crew were rescued.
Earl of Kingston	United Kingdom	The smack was driven ashore in Lough Swilly. She was refloated in mid-April.
Emma	United Kingdom	The brig was driven ashore and wrecked on South Ronaldsay, Orkney Islands with the loss of all ten crew. She was on a voyage from Dundee, Forfarshire to Montreal, Province of Canada, British North America.
Empress	United Kingdom	The ship was driven ashore and wrecked at Sundeland.
Frances	United Kingdom	The ship was driven ashore at Hartlepool, County Durham. Her crew were rescued.
Frau Annie	(Denmark) Duchy of Schleswig	The ship was driven ashore and wrecked at Warkworth, Northumberland with the loss of a crew member.
George	France	The sloop was driven ashore and wrecked at Warkworth. Her crew were rescued.
Georgina	United Kingdom	The ship was driven ashore and severely damaged at Annagassan, County Louth. Her crew survived. She was on a voyage from Glasgow, Renfrewshire to Porto, Portugal. Georgina was refloated in mid-April.
Good Intent	United Kingdom	The ship was driven ashore at Tynemouth.
Grace	United Kingdom	The brig was driven ashore and wrecked in Ardmore Bay with the loss of nine of her eleven crew. She was on a voyage from Alexandria, Egypt to Queenstown, County Cork.
Heloise	France	The brig sank at Sunderland. She was on a voyage from Rouen, Seine-Inférieure to Sunderland.
Henry	United Kingdom	The ship was driven ashore at Hartlepool.
Hibernia	United Kingdom	The schooner was driven ashore at Dungarvon, County Waterford. She was on a voyage from Newport, Monmouthshire to Youghal, County Cork.
James	United Kingdom	The schooner was driven ashore at Tynemouth.
Jane	United Kingdom	The schooner was wrecked on the Muck Rocks, off the coast of Moray. Her crew were rescued. She was on a voyage from Sunderland to Portgordon, Moray.
John Souchay	United Kingdom	The ship ran aground and was damaged at Mauritius during a hurricane.
Kate	United Kingdom	The brig was driven ashore at Ballinacourty, County Waterford. She was on a voyage from Cádiz, Spain to Dublin.
Laurel	United Kingdom	The ship was driven ashore in the Bay of Luce. Her crew were rescued. She was on a voyage from Liverpool to Stralsund. She was refloated on 14 April and towed in to Ardrossan, Ayrshire.
Liberty and Property	United Kingdom	The ship was driven ashore and severely damaged at Hartlepool.
Little Henry	United Kingdom	The ship was in collision with the barque Isis (United Kingdom). She was then driven ashore at Hartlepool.
Luna	Kingdom of Hanover	The galiot was driven ashore at Tynemouth. Her crew were rescued. She was on a voyage from Hamburg to South Shields, County Durham.
Martin	United Kingdom	The brig was driven ashore and severely damaged at Sunderland.
Mary	United Kingdom	The schooner was driven ashore at Queenstown, County Cork.
Mary Anne	United Kingdom	The collier was driven ashore at Tynemouth. Her crew were rescued by a lifeboat. She was on a voyage from South Shields to London. Mary Ann was refloated in mid-April.
Merchant	United Kingdom	The ship was driven ashore and severely damaged at Hartlepool.
Minnett	Sweden	The brig was driven ashore at Tynemouth. Her crew were rescued. She was on a voyage from Newcastle upon Tyne, Northumberland to Trieste. Minnet was refloated on 10 June and taken in to North Shields, County Durham.
Mona	United Kingdom	The sloop was driven ashore and wrecked in Chapelrossan Bay. Her crew were rescued.
Nancy	United Kingdom	The ship was driven ashore at Hartlepool.
New Darlington	United Kingdom	The ship was driven ashore on the coast of County Durham. She was refloated.
Nelson	United Kingdom	The ship was abandoned in the North Sea off Banff, Aberdeenshire with the loss of one life. She was on a voyage from Sunderland to Aberdeen.
Pegasus	United Kingdom	The ship was driven ashore on the coast of County Durham.
Preston	United Kingdom	The schooner was wrecked on the Cannon Rock, in the Irish Sea with the loss of all hands. She was on a voyage from Dundalk, County Louth to Llanelly, Glamorgan.
RMS Royal Adelaide	United Kingdom	The paddle steamer was wrecked on the Tongue Sand, in the North Sea off the coast of Kent with the loss of about 300 lives. She was on a voyage from Cork to London.
Salus	United Kingdom	The brig was driven ashore at Sunderland.
Sarah Ellen	United Kingdom	The ship was driven ashore and severely damaged at Sunderland.
Sun	United Kingdom	The ship was wrecked on Hoy, Orkney Islands with the loss of five of her eight crew.
Supply	United Kingdom	The ship was driven ashore and severely damaged at Sunderland.
Sylphiden	Norway	The schooner foundered in the Pentland Firth with the loss of all hands. She subsequently came ashore on South Ronaldsay, Orkney Islands in a capsized condition.
Tar	United Kingdom	The schooner was driven out to sea from Sunderland. She returned to port on 5 April in a damaged condition.
Theodore	United Kingdom	The schooner was driven ashore at Tynemouth. Her crew survived.
Theresa Jane	United Kingdom	The barque was wrecked on the Mew Rocks, in the Belfast Lough with the loss of eight of her sixteen crew. She was on a voyage from Liverpool to Maranhão, Brazil.
Thomas	United Kingdom	The ship was driven ashore and severely damaged at Blyth, Northumberland. Her crew were rescued.
Vigilant	United Kingdom	The schooner was driven ashore and wrecked at Tynemouth. Her crew were rescued.
Violet	United Kingdom	The ship was driven ashore at Hartlepool. She was refloated in mid-April.
William	United Kingdom	The schooner was driven against the quayside and severely damaged at Stromness, Orkney Islands.
William and Ann	United Kingdom	The ship was driven ashore and severely damaged at Hartlepool. She was refloated in mid-April.

== 31 March ==
List of shipwrecks: 31 March 1850
Ship	State	Description
Argo	United Kingdom	The brig was driven ashore at Sunderland, County Durham.
Benjamin and Sarah, or James and Sarah	United Kingdom	The Yorkshire Billyboy was driven ashore at Sunderland. She was on a voyage from London to Sunderland.
Bravo	United Kingdom	The brig sprang a leak. She was run ashore and wrecked near Bamburgh Castle, Northumberland. All on board were rescued. She was on a voyage from Newcastle upon Tyne, Northumberland to London.
Burrell	United Kingdom	The barque was driven ashore in Coney Island Bay, County Down. She was on a voyage from Lancaster, Lancashire to Quebec City, Province of Canada, British North America.
Don Quixote	United Kingdom	The ship struck a sunken rock off St. David's Head, Pembrokeshire. She was on a voyage from Marseille, Bouches-du-Rhône, France to Liverpool, Lancashire. She put in to Holyhead, Anglesey in a leaky condition.
Eliza	United Kingdom	The ship was driven ashore at Gillar Point, Pembrokeshire. Her crew were rescued. She was on a voyage from Llanelly, Glamorgan to San Francisco, Alta California. She was refloated in mid-April and taken in to Tenby, Pembrokeshire for repairs.
Emma	United Kingdom	The ship was driven ashore at South Shields, County Durham.
Esther	France	The brig sank at Sunderland.
Falconer	United Kingdom	The ship was driven ashore at South Shields.
Lance	United Kingdom	The schooner was driven ashore and wrecked 2 nautical miles (3.7 km) north of Drogheda, County Louth. Her crew were rescued. She was on a voyage from Newport, Monmouthshire to Liverpool. Lance was refloated on 14 April and taken in to Drogheda for repairs.
Laurel	United Kingdom	The ship was driven ashore at South Shields.
Louise	France	The ship sank at Sunderland.
Maid of Galloway	United Kingdom	The paddle steamer suffered a boiler explosion. She was consequently driven ashore and wrecked at Balbriggan, County Louth. She was on a voyage from Liverpool to Dublin.
Maize	United Kingdom	The brig was driven ashore and severely damaged at South Shields.
Metcalfe	United Kingdom	The Yorkshire Billyboy was driven ashore at Sunderland. She was on a voyage from London to Sunderland.
Midge	United Kingdom	The schooner was damaged by fire at Whitstable, Kent.
Sally	United Kingdom	The brig was driven ashore and wrecked at South Shields. Her crew were rescued. She was on a voyage from London to South Shields.
Sarah Ann	United Kingdom	The barque ran aground on the North Bull, in the Irish Sea. She was on a voyage from Liverpool to the United States.
Shipwright	United Kingdom	The ship was driven ashore at South Shields.
Spalding	United Kingdom	The Yorkshire Billyboy was driven ashore at Sunderland. She was on a voyage from London to Sunderland.
Stanton	United Kingdom	The ship was driven ashore at South Shields.
Union	United Kingdom	The brig was driven ashore at South Shields. She was refloated on 12 April and taken in to South Shields.

== Unknown date ==
List of shipwrecks: unknown date 1850
Ship	State	Description
Anne	United Kingdom	The ship ran aground and sank on the Middle Ground, in the North Sea off the coast of County Durham. She had been refloated by 16 March.
Carolina Amalia	Flag unknown	The ship struck the Mill Rock, in the Pacific Ocean off the west coast of America and sank between 17 and 31 March.
Commerce	United Kingdom	The brig foundered in the Mediterranean Sea off Malta. Her crew survived.
Commerce	United Kingdom	The flat sank in the Flint Channel. She was refloated on 14 March and beached at Chester, Cheshire.
Eliza	United Kingdom	The ship was driven ashore on Bird Island, County Down. She was on a voyage from Glasgow, Renfrewshire to Neath, Glamorgan.
Experiment	(United Kingdom of Great Britain and Ireland) Guernsey	The cutter was wrecked off the Bréhon Tower, between Guernsey and Herm, Channel Islands. The captain and eight passengers drowned, but 20 people were saved by the lifeboat. She was on a voyage from Guernsey to Alderney, Channel Islands.
Falcon	(United Kingdom of Great Britain and Ireland) New Zealand	The schooner was wrecked in Hawke Bay.
Handelslust	Kingdom of Hanover	The ship was driven ashore on Borkum before 19 March. She was on a voyage from Emden to London.
Maese Packet	United Kingdom	The ship foundered in the North Sea off the coast of Aberdeenshire before 1 April. Crew presumed drowned.
Margaret	United States	The brig was abandoned in the Atlantic Ocean before 2 March. She was on a voyage from the Bay of Honduras to New York.
Mary Stewart	United Kingdom	The ship was driven ashore near the Rock of Tulcha, Ottoman Empire. She was refloated on 12 March.
Montreal	United Kingdom	The ship was lost off the Shetland Islands before 19 March.
Post Boy	(United Kingdom of Great Britain and Ireland) New Zealand	The schooner was wrecked in Hawke Bay.
Sylph	United Kingdom	The schooner was wrecked at Truxillo before 9 March.
True Blue	United Kingdom	The ship was wrecked on the Ve Skerries, Shetland Islands in late March.
Tuscany	United States	The fishing schooner probably sank in a gale on the Georges Bank on the 23rd, last seen a few hours before the storm hit. Lost with all 8 crew.
William Peile	United Kingdom	The ship ran aground on the English Bank, in the River Plate before 29 March. She was later refloated with assistance from HMS Harpy (Royal Navy).
