= Coraline (disambiguation) =

Coraline is a 2002 novella by the British writer Neil Gaiman.

Coraline may also refer to:

== Based on the novella ==
- Coraline (film), a 2009 animated film
- Coraline (musical), a 2009 musical
- Coraline (opera), a 2018 opera by Mark-Anthony Turnage
- "Coraline", a song by Rasputina from Where's Neil When You Need Him?, a 2006 tribute album based on Gaiman's works

== Based on the film ==
- Coraline (video game), a 2009 video game based on the film

== Other uses ==
- Coraline (given name)
- "Coraline" (song), a song by Måneskin from Teatro d'ira: Vol. I (2021)
- Coraline Duvall, a vampire in Moonlight (TV series)
- Coraline, a character in Adolphe Adam's 1849 opera Le toréador
- Coraline, a material used to make a corset bone

== See also ==
- Coralline (disambiguation)
- Caroline
