= List of shipwrecks in December 1831 =

The list of shipwrecks in December 1831 includes ships sunk, foundered, grounded, or otherwise lost during December 1831.

== 2 December ==
List of shipwrecks: 2 December 1831
Ship	State	Description
Briton	United Kingdom	The ship was wrecked on Paul's Island, Labrador, British North America with the loss of all but one of her crew. She was on a voyage from Miramichi, New Brunswick, British North America to London.
Eliza	United Kingdom	The ship was driven ashore on Eierland, North Holland, Netherlands, where she broke up on 8 December. She was on a voyage from Saint Petersburg, Russia to Liverpool, Lancashire.
Feister von Segultz	Prussia	The ship was driven ashore on Bornholm, Denmark. She was on a voyage from Memel to London.
Minerva	United Kingdom	The ship was driven ashore near Danzig, Prussia.

== 3 December ==
List of shipwrecks: 3 December 1831
Ship	State	Description
Fame	United Kingdom	The ship was wrecked on the Shipwash Sand, in the North Sea off the coast of Essex. Her crew were rescued. Her crew were rescued. She was on a voyage from Saint Petersburg, Russia to London.
William and Ann	(United Kingdom of Great Britain and Ireland) British North America	The ship was wrecked on Newfoundland. She was on a voyage from Quebec City, Lower Canada to Newfoundland.

== 4 December ==
List of shipwrecks: 4 December 1831
Ship	State	Description
Alexander	United Kingdom	The schooner was driven ashore and wrecked at Patchogue, New York with the loss of four of the nine people on board. She was on a voyage from Balize, British Honduras to Boston, Massachusetts.
Aurora	United Kingdom	The ship was wrecked at La Baye, Grenada. She was on a voyage from London to Grenada.
Benjamin Milliken	United Kingdom	The ship was wrecked on Cape Sable Island, Nova Scotia, British North America. She was on a voyage from Liverpool, Lancashire to Saint Andrews, New Brunswick, British North America.
Thetis	(United Kingdom of Great Britain and Ireland) Grenada	The ship was run down and sunk by Jeune Volsey (flag unknown) with the loss of ten lives. She was on a voyage from Saint Thomas, Virgin Islands to Grenada.
Vulcan	Sweden	The ship was wrecked at Tacumshane, County Waterford, United Kingdom. Her crew survived.

== 5 December ==
List of shipwrecks: 5 December 1831
Ship	State	Description
William Pugh	United Kingdom	The Mersey flat foundered on the Hoyle Bank, in Liverpool Bay. Her crew were rescued by a lifeboat.

== 6 December ==
List of shipwrecks: 6 December 1831
Ship	State	Description
British Tar	United Kingdom	The ship was wrecked on Prince Edward Island, British North America. Her crew were rescued. She was on a voyage from Cocagne, New Brunswick, British North America to Liverpool, Lancashire.

== 7 December ==
List of shipwrecks: 7 December 1831
Ship	State	Description
Atlas	United States	The brig was wrecked in Chesil Cove with the loss of two of her eleven crew. She was on a voyage from Rotterdam, South Holland, Netherlands to Charleston, South Carolina.
Elizabeth	United Kingdom	The ship was wrecked in the Atlantic Ocean and was consequently abandoned on 12 December. Her crew were rescued by Juno (United Kingdom). She was on a voyage from Quebec City, Lower Canada, British North America to London.
Margaretta	United Kingdom	The ship was driven ashore at Penzance, Cornwall. Her crew were rescued. She was on a voyage from Seville, Spain to London.
Oby	United Kingdom	The ship was driven ashore 4 nautical miles (7.4 km) east of Littlehampton, Sussex. She was on a voyage from Rotterdam, South Holland, Netherlands to Shoreham-by-Sea, Sussex.
William	United Kingdom	The ship sank at Great Yarmouth, Norfolk. She was refloated on 19 December and taken in to Great Yarmouth.

== 8 December ==
List of shipwrecks: 8 December 1831
Ship	State	Description
St. Laurent	France	The ship was driven ashore near Littlehampton, Sussex, United Kingdom. She was on a voyage from the Charente to London, United Kingdom.

== 9 December ==
List of shipwrecks: 9 December 1831
Ship	State	Description
America	United States	The brig was wrecked in the Atlantic Ocean. Her crew were rescued by the barque Nanna (United Kingdom). America was on a voyage from Stockholm, Sweden to Newburyport, Massachusetts.
Jane	United Kingdom	The ship was wrecked 15 leagues (45 nautical miles (83 km) north east of Bahia, Brazil with the loss of two lives. She was on a voyage from Montevideo, Uruguay to Havana, Cuba.

== 10 December ==
List of shipwrecks: 10 December 1831
Ship	State	Description
Hannah	United Kingdom	The brig was wrecked on the Scoughall Rocks, in the Firth of Forth off Dunbar, Lothian. Her crew survived. She was on a voyage from Saint Petersburg, Russia to Hull, Yorkshire.

== 11 December ==
List of shipwrecks: 11 December 1831
Ship	State	Description
Caroline	United States	The brig was driven ashore and wrecked at Cape Henlopen, Delaware with the loss of one of the sixteen people on board. She was on a voyage from Calcutta, India to Philadelphia, Pennsylvania.
Falcon	United Kingdom	The ship was wrecked near "Villanova" with the loss of three of her crew. She was on a voyage from Gibraltar to Villanova.
Kitty	United Kingdom	The ship was driven ashore in Fishguard Bay. She was on a voyage from Newport, Monmouthshire to Youghal, County Cork.
Lady Hamilton	United Kingdom	The whaler was wrecked in the Aldabra Islands. Her crew were rescued.
Phaeton	United Kingdom	The ship was driven ashore at Saltfleet, Lincolnshire. Her crew were rescued. She was on a voyage from Amsterdam, North Holland, Netherlands to Hull.

== 12 December ==
List of shipwrecks: 12 December 1831
Ship	State	Description
David Ricardo	United Kingdom	The ship ran aground in the Scheldt at Fort St. Mari, Antwerp, Belgium. She was on a voyage from Riga, Russia to Antwerp.
Eliza	United Kingdom	The ship was wrecked on the coast of County Donegal. She was on a voyage from Liverpool, Lancashire to Ballyshannon, County Donegal.
Fabius	Netherlands	The ship was driven ashore at Barnegat, New Jersey, United States. She was on a voyage from Amsterdam, North Holland to New York, United States.
John Campbell	United Kingdom	The ship was driven ashore and wrecked at Crookhaven, County Cork. Her crew were rescued. She was on a voyage from Quebec City, Lower Canada, British North America to Cork.

== 13 December ==
List of shipwrecks: 13 December 1831
Ship	State	Description
Friends	United Kingdom	The ship was driven ashore at Careen Point, County Wexford. She was on a voyage from Saint John, New Brunswick, British North America to Dublin.
Friends	United Kingdom	The ship was wrecked on Schouwen, South Holland, Netherlands. She was on a voyage from Riga, Russia to Antwerp, Belgium.
Standard	United Kingdom	The ship was abandoned in the Atlantic Ocean (50°16′N 8°00′W). Her crew were rescued by Agnes ( Bremen). Standard was on a voyage from Quebec City, Lower Canada, British North America to London.

== 14 December ==
List of shipwrecks: 14 December 1831
Ship	State	Description
Ann	United Kingdom	The ship departed from Saint John's, Newfoundland for Swansea, Glamorgan. No further trace, presumed foundered with the loss of all hands.
Nanna	United Kingdom	The barque sprang a leak in the Atlantic Ocean and was abandoned by all on board with the loss of one crew member from Nanna. Survivors were rescued the next day by Nimrod (United Kingdom).

== 15 December ==
List of shipwrecks: 15 December 1831
Ship	State	Description
Fort William	United Kingdom	The ship was dismasted off Halifax, Nova Scotia, British North America and was abandoned by her crew. She was later towed in to Halifax.
Venus	United Kingdom	The ship ran aground in the River Lee and sank. She was on a voyage from Cork to London.

== 16 December ==
List of shipwrecks: 16 December 1831
Ship	State	Description
Esther	United Kingdom	The ship departed from Portland, Dorset for São Miguel, Azores, Portugal. No further trace, presumed foundered with the loss of all hands.
Favourite	United Kingdom	The ship was wrecked on the Kentish Knock, in the North Sea off the coast of Kent with the loss of a crew member. She was o a voyage from South Shields, County Durham to Brixham, Devon.
Hunter	United Kingdom	The brig was driven ashore and wrecked at Crinan, Argyllshire.
Margaret	(United Kingdom of Great Britain and Ireland) Demerara	The schooner capsized off the mouth of the Orinoco River with the loss of three lives. She was on a voyage from Martinique to Demerara.

== 17 December ==
List of shipwrecks: 17 December 1831
Ship	State	Description
Brothers	United Kingdom	The ship was driven ashore and wrecked in Dundrum Bay. Her crew were rescued. She was on a voyage from Dublin to Wick, Caithness.
Lisette	United Kingdom	The ship struck a rock in the North Sea off North Foreland, Kent and foundered. Her crew were rescued. She was on a voyage from Neath, Glamorgan to Danzig, Prussia.
Russell	United Kingdom	The ship ran aground at Pembroke and broke her back. She was on a voyage from Pembroke to New York, United States.
Salus	United Kingdom	The ship was wrecked at Dunoon, Argyllshire. She was on a voyage from Kronstadt, Russia to Belfast, County Antrim.

== 18 December ==
List of shipwrecks: 18 December 1831
Ship	State	Description
Aid	United Kingdom	The ship was driven ashore at "Roslegh Point" with the loss of all hands. She was on a voyage from Miramichi, New Brunswick, British North America to New Ross, County Wexford.
Cyclops	United Kingdom	The brig was wrecked in the Atlantic Ocean with the loss of two of her eleven crew. She arrived off Dunbeg, County Clare on 21 December and the survivors were rescued. Cyclops was on a voyage from Quebec City, Lower Canada, British North America to Dublin.
Hannah	United Kingdom	The ship was driven ashore near "Dunbaron". Her crew were rescued. She was on a voyage from Saint Petersburgh, Russia to Hull.
William Henry	United Kingdom	The ship was wrecked on Seal Island, Nova Scotia, British North America. She was on a voyage from Barbados to Saint Andrews, New Brunswick, British North America.
Mary	United Kingdom	The brig was wrecked near Cape Sable, Nova Scotia, British North America. She was on a voyage from Dublin to Saint John, New Brunswick, British North America, captained by James Duncan of Dublin. Crew and passengers were saved.

== 19 December ==
List of shipwrecks: 19 December 1831
Ship	State	Description
James	United Kingdom	The ship was driven ashore at Mullaghmore, County Sligo. She was on a voyage from Glasgow, Renfrewshire to Ballyshannon, County Donegal.
Miles Standish	United States	The ship was wrecked in the Abaco Islands. Her crew were rescued. She was on a voyage from Savannah, Georgia to Jamaica.
Standard	United Kingdom	The ship was driven ashore crewless and wrecked at Clovelly, Devon. She was on a voyage from Quebec City, Lower Canada, British North America to London.

== 20 December ==
List of shipwrecks: 20 December 1831
Ship	State	Description
Aricic	Kingdom of Sardinia	The ship foundered off Cape Delmele. She was on a voyage from Genoa to Marseille, Bouches-du-Rhône, France.
Eliza	United Kingdom	The ship was wrecked in Whitsand Bay, Cornwall. Her crew were rescued. She was on a voyage from Algeciras, Spain to Falmouth, Cornwall.
Three Friends	United Kingdom	The ship was in collision with Perseverance and sank in the North Sea off Aldeburgh, Suffolk. Her crew were rescued. She was on a voyage from Stockton on Tees, County Durham to London.

== 21 December ==
List of shipwrecks: 21 December 1831
Ship	State	Description
Eclipse	United Kingdom	The ship was wrecked on Cape Sable Island, Nova Scotia, British North America. She was on a voyage from New York, United States to Halifax, Nova Scotia.
Isabella	United Kingdom	The ship was wrecked on the Duggan Rock, in the Atlantic Ocean off Ballinskelligs, County Kerry. All on board were rescued. She was on a voyage from Miramichi, New Brunswick, British North America to Liverpool, Lancashire.

== 22 December ==
List of shipwrecks: 22 December 1831
Ship	State	Description
Edward Walker	United Kingdom	The ship was driven ashore above Digby Gut with the loss of all but two of her crew. She was on a voyage from Saint John, New Brunswick, British North America to Dublin.
Favourite	United Kingdom	The ship was lost on the Kentish Knock Sand, in the North Sea off the coast of Kent with the loss of a crew member. She was on a voyage from South Shields, County Durham to Falmouth, Cornwall. Two survivors were rescued by Success (United Kingdom).

== 23 December ==
List of shipwrecks: 23 December 1831
Ship	State	Description
Junge Jurgon	Hamburg	The ship departed from Gravesend, Kent, United Kingdom for Hamburg. No further trace, presumed foundered with the loss of all hands.
La Bonne Julia	France	The brig was driven ashore and wrecked at Bannow, County Wexford, United Kingdom with the loss of all nine crew. She was on a voyage from Bordeaux, Gironde to Nord.
William Smith	United Kingdom	The sloop foundered in the Bristol Channel. Her crew were rescued. She was on a voyage from Penzance, Cornwall to Cardiff, Glamorgan.

== 25 December ==
List of shipwrecks: 25 December 1831
Ship	State	Description
Wellington	United Kingdom	The ship capsized in the Mediterranean Sea. Her crew survived. She was on a voyage from Genoa, Kingdom of Sardinia to Alicante, Spain.

== 26 December ==
List of shipwrecks: 26 December 1831
Ship	State	Description
Gestrickland	Sweden	The ship sprang a leak and was abandoned off the Blasket Islands, County Cork, United Kingdom. Her crew were rescued by Agnes (United Kingdom). She was on a voyage from Gefle to Gibraltar
Royal Adelaide	United Kingdom	The ship foundered in the Bristol Channel.
William	United Kingdom	The ship sank at Shoreham-by-Sea, Sussex. She was on a voyage from South Shields, County Durham to Shoreham-by-Sea.

== 28 December ==
List of shipwrecks: 28 December 1831
Ship	State	Description
Eagle	United Kingdom	The brig was wrecked on The Skerries, County Antrim with the loss of all six of her crew. She was on a voyage from the Clyde to Londonderry.
Nancy	United Kingdom	The sloop was wrecked on the Skerries with the loss of all but one of her crew. She was on a voyage from the Clyde to Londonderry.

== 29 December ==
List of shipwrecks: 29 December 1831
Ship	State	Description
Caroline	United Kingdom	The mail boat was lost in the Digby Gut. She was on a voyage from Saint John, New Brunswick, British North America to Digby, Nova Scotia, British North America. All aboard were lost.
Kallyline or Molly	United Kingdom	The ship was wrecked on the coast of Connemara, Ireland. She was on a voyage from Plymouth, Devon to Galway.
Pacific	United States	The ship was lost with all hands whilst on a voyage from New York to Halifax, Nova Scotia.
Volante	United Kingdom	The ship was wrecked at Sandy Cove, Digby, Nova Scotia with the loss of three of her crew. She was on a voyage from Saint Johns to Jamaica.

== 30 December ==
List of shipwrecks: 30 December 1831
Ship	State	Description
Mary Ann	United Kingdom	The ship capsized at Newport, Monmouthshire.

== Unknown date ==
List of shipwrecks: Unknown date 1831
Ship	State	Description
Adrian	United Kingdom	The ship was lost near Lagos, Greece before 10 December whilst bound for Constantinople, Ottoman Empire.
Aid	United Kingdom	The ship was wrecked on the Black Water Banks, in the Irish Sea off the coast of County Wexford. Her crew were rescued.
Aid	United Kingdom	The ship was driven ashore and wrecked at Rossbeigh, County Kerry with the loss of all eight of her crew. She was on a voyage from Miramichi, New Brunswick, British North America to New Ross, County Wexford.
Ann	United Kingdom	The ship was driven ashore and wrecked on the coast of Delaware, United States before 17 December. She was on a voyage from Liverpool, Lancashire to Philadelphia, Pennsylvania, United States.
Ann Comer	United Kingdom	The brig was driven ashore and wrecked on Hanö, Sweden. She was on a voyage from Riga, Russia to Liverpool, Lancashire.
Arrow	His Majesty's Coastguard	The watch vessel, a brig, was driven ashore and wrecked near Newhaven, Sussex.
Bellerophon	United Kingdom	The ship was wrecked on Green Point, Newfoundland, British North America.
Briton	United Kingdom	The ship foundered on or after 2 December. She was on a voyage from Miramichi to London.
Cleopatra	United Kingdom	The ship foundered off the coast of Scotland. She was on a voyage from Dublin to Van Diemen's Land.
Concordia	United Kingdom	The ship was wrecked on Öland, Sweden.
Congress	United Kingdom	The ship was wrecked on Belle Île, Finistère, France with the loss of 60 lives. There were at least eighteen survivors.
Duke of Wellington	(United Kingdom of Great Britain and Ireland) Jersey	The ship was abandoned off Cape San Antonio, Spain before 30 December.
Experiment	United Kingdom	The ship foundered in the Atlantic Ocean on or before 31 December. Her crew survived. She was on a voyage from São Miguel, Azores, Portugal to London.
Glentanner	United Kingdom	The ship was wrecked in Loch Madden. She was on a voyage from Stockholm, Sweden to Limerick.
Hannah and Tomb	United Kingdom	The ship departed from Quebec City bound for Liverpool. No further trace, presumed foundered with the loss of all hands.
Hebe	United Kingdom	The ship was wrecked on Düne, Heligoland in late December. Her crew were rescued. She was on a voyage from Riga, Russia to Liverpool.
Henry	France	The ship was lost near Middelburg, Zeeland, Netherlands. She was on a voyage from Bordeaux, Gironde to Antwerp, Belgium.
Jones	France	The ship was wrecked near Christiana, Norway. She was on a voyage from Havre de Grâce, Seine-Inférieure to Saint Petersburgh, Russia.
Lord Wellington	United Kingdom	The ship was driven ashore on "Point Aux Caux", Nova Scotia, British North America. Her crew were rescued. She was on a voyage from Chatham, Kent to Quebec City, Lower Canada, British North America.
Pacific	United States	The ship was lost with all hands in late December. She was on a voyage from New York to Halifax, Nova Scotia.
Rosean	United Kingdom	The ship was wrecked on "Point Sepeau", Nova Scotia. All on board were rescued. She was on a voyage from Halifax, Nova Scotia to London.
Teutonia	Rostock	The ship was wrecked at "Nidinger" before 12 December. She was on a voyage from Rostock to Rouen, Seine-Inférieure, France.
Vigilant	United Kingdom	The ship was wrecked on the North Bank, in Liverpool Bay. Her crew were rescued. She was on a voyage from Newfoundland, British North America to Liverpool, Lancashire.
Volante	(United Kingdom of Great Britain and Ireland) British North America	The ship was wrecked in the Gut of Canso near Sandy Cove, Newfoundland in late December with the loss of three of her crew. She was on a voyage from Saint John's, Newfoundland to Jamaica.
Young Samuel	United Kingdom	The ship was wrecked in the Bay of Bulls. She was on a voyage from Quebec City to Jersey, Channel Islands.
