= Lady Hamilton (disambiguation) =

Lady Hamilton was the mistress of Horatio Nelson.

Lady Hamilton may also refer to:

- Lady Hamilton (1921 film), a silent German film directed by Richard Oswald
- Lady Hamilton (1808 ship), a vessel built in Denmark that the British captured
- That Hamilton Woman, a 1941 British film directed by Alexander Korda
- Emma Hamilton (film), a 1968 European film directed by Christian-Jacque
