= Coralline =

Coralline means 'resembling coral' and may refer to:

- Coralline algae, or corallines, red algae that produce calcareous deposits
- Less commonly, organisms that resemble coral, such as certain bryozoans, hydrozoans, or coralline sponges
- The calcareous material in coral reefs
- Coralline rock, produced by coralline algae
- Something having a red coral colour

== See also ==
- Coraline (disambiguation)
