= Cheviot (1827 ship) =

1827 British ship

History

United Kingdom
- Name: Cheviot
- Namesake: The Cheviot
- Builder: Peter Laing, Deptford, or Sunderland
- Launched: 1827
- Fate: Wrecked 24 March 1854

General characteristics
- Tons burthen: Originally: 218 (bm); 1832: 251, or 258
- Length: 91 ft 2 in (27.8 m)
- Beam: 25 ft 1 in (7.6 m)
- Depth of hold: 5 ft 3 in (1.6 m)
- Sail plan: Snow; later barque
- Armament: 4 guns; one after 1837

Cheviot was a ship launched in Sunderland in 1827. Initially she sailed between London and Quebec. Then in 1831 she became a whaler and sailed to the British Southern Whale Fishery. She never returned to England from that voyage, instead becoming based in Hobart and remaining there as whaler and merchantman. She was lost in March 1854.

== Statement of significance ==
The Cheviot is historically significant for being associated with Hobart whalers James Kelly, William Mansfield and Charles Seal, who all owned the Cheviot at some stage in their careers. When Charles Seal died, ownership of the Cheviot and the rest of his whaling and cargo/ passenger ships passed into the hands of his wife Phillis Seal, making her the first woman shipowner, and fleet owner in Australia. The Cheviot is archaeologically significant for representing the remains of an early 19th century Atlantic, South Seas, and colonial Australian whaling vessel, and is one of only a handful of shipwreck sites relating to the whaling industry in Victoria.

— Victorian Heritage Database.

== Career ==
Cheviot first appeared in the Register of Shipping (RS) with Mawson, master, Laing, owner, and trade Sunderland–London.

Year	Master	Owner	Trade	Source
1830	Mawson; T.Phelp	Laing	Sunderland–London; Sunderland–Quebec	RS
1832	T.Phelp; T[homas] Bateman	Laing; Pirie & Co.	Sunderland–Quebec; London–Southern Fishery	RS

In 1831 the ownership of Cheviot changed. The new owners lengthened her, and with a new master, sailed her on a whaling voyage to the waters of the Dutch East Indies and Pacific.

Cheviot first appeared in Lloyd's Register (LR) in 1831 with a launch year of 1831, and other incorrect or questionable information. This has led several sources, such as Hackman, astray.

Year	Master	Owner	Trade	Source
1831	Helmsley; Bateman	R.Scott	Bristol	LR
1832	Bateman	Pirie & Co.	London–South Seas	LR

Whaling voyage: Captain Thomas Bateman sailed from England on 7 November 1831. The French whaler Aigle on 23 May 1832 informed Bateman that Lady Hamilton had been lost in the Mozambique Channel.

Cheviot sailed through the Gilolo Passage (Laut Halmahera and Gebe Island) into the Pacific on 30 December 1832. She was reported at various times at Oahu, Hobart, Tahiti, and Honolulu. On 3 July 1833 Cadmus passed on to Cheviot that the whaler Borneo had been lost on the coast of the Seychelles.

Later career: Cheviot did not return to England. She continued whaling through to 1837 when Captain James Kelly registered her in Hobart as her owner. Under his ownership she increasingly spent more time in local trade and less in whaling.

In 1842 Charles Seal and William John Mansfield of Hobart purchased Cheviot. When Seal died in November 1852 his wife Phillis Seal became the owner of Cheviot, and the rest of his fleet. (Another one of the Seal whalers was Aladdin.) Mansfield bought out Seal's share in Cheviot but lost his ownership in 1853 to the mortgagor. He remained her master, however, until she was lost. In all, the vessel made 11 whaling voyages from Hobart between 1837 and 1852.

== Fate ==
Cheviot was wrecked on 24 March 1854 off Wilson's Promontory in Waterloo Bay. She was on a voyage from Hobart to Melbourne with a cargo of 343 planks, 213 piles, 705 bags lime, 36 trusses hay, and seven boxes. She foundered in a gale while in the Waterloo Bay anchorage.
