= Sweet Caroline (disambiguation) =

"Sweet Caroline" is a 1969 song by Neil Diamond. Sweet Caroline may also refer to:

- "Sweet Caroline" (Prison Break), 2007
- "Sweet Caroline", a song from a re-release of the 1969 album Ahead Rings Out by Blodwyn Pig
- "Sweet Caroline", a song from The Gap Band's 1980 eponymous album The Gap Band III

== See also ==
- Caroline (disambiguation)
