= Caroline (1804 Shoreham ship) =

History

United Kingdom
- Name: Caroline
- Builder: John Edwards (or Edwardes), Shoreham
- Launched: 17 August 1804
- Fate: Condemned 1824

General characteristics
- Tons burthen: 1804:396 (bm); 1810 (after lengthening): 447 (bm)
- Armament: 1806: 2 guns
- Notes: 1815: 16 guns

Caroline was a merchant vessel launched at Shoreham in 1804 as a West Indiaman. She spent almost her entire career sailing to the West Indies, and endured two maritime mishaps during that period, one at Sierra Leone. She sailed to Batavia in 1824 under a license from the British East India Company (EIC). From Batavia she sailed to Sincapore, where she was condemned.

== Career ==
Caroline first appeared in Lloyd's Register (LR) in 1806.

Year	Master	Owner	Trade	Source & notes
1806	J.W.Phelan	Neave & Co.	London–St Kitts	LR
1810	Hays	Neave & Co.	London–St Kitts	LR; lengthened & damages repaired 1810

Lloyd's List (LL) reported that as Caroline, Hayes, master, was coming to London from St Kitts she had run ashore at Blackwall in October 1810 and had suffered much damage.

Year	Master	Owner	Trade	Source & notes
1815	W.Phelan	Neave & Co.	London–St Kitts	LR; lengthened & damages repaired 1810
1821	J.Clark; Campbell	Neave & Co. Meacham	London–St Kitts	LR; lengthened & damages repaired 1810
1822	Campbell; Dunlop	Neave & Co. Mesburne	London; London–Gibraltar	LR; lengthened & damages repaired 1810

On 23 March 1822 Hetty, Goodwin, master, encountered Caroline, Campbell, master, at 38°40′N 52°40′W. Caroline had lost her bowsprit and foretop mast, her sails had been blown away, and both pumps were going continuously. Hetty passed over provisions and pump leather before a gale drove Hetty away. On 10 April Caroline, Campbell, master, arrived at Plymouth, and on 21 April at Gravesend, from Jamaica.

When Caroline arrived at Plymouth she reported that on 16 March at 43°27′N 32°50′W she had come upon a brig, dismasted and waterlogged. She was of approximately 180 tons (bm), had yellow sides with a black streak, and a mast painted yellow lying ore-and-aft on her deck.

On 21 June 1822 Caroline, Dunlop, master, sailed from Gravesend for Gibraltar. She sailed via Falmouth, which she left on 28 July, bound for Gibraltar and Malta. On 1 January 1823 Caroline, Dunlop, master, arrived at Sierra Leone, from Malta. She was reported to still be at Sierra Leone on 30 March, very leaky, and with her crew having all died. Caroline, Dunlop, master, arrived at Gravesend on 30 June from Sierra Leone.

Year	Master	Owner	Trade	Source & notes
1824	Dunlop; Harrison	Meaborne	London; London–Batavia	LR; lengthened & damages repaired 1810, & damages repaired 1823
1825	Harrison	Meaborne	London–Batavia	LR; damage repaired 1823

In 1813 the EIC had lost its monopoly on the trade between India and Britain. British ships were then free to sail to India or the Indian Ocean under a license from the EIC. Captain Harris sailed from London in December 1823 under a license from the EIC. The list of licensed vessels for 1823 showed her destination as Penang. When Caroline sailed from Plymouth on 27 February 1824 her destination was Batavia.

== Fate ==
A letter to Lloyd's List from Batavia dated 16 July 1824 reported that on 2 July Caroline, Harris, master, had had part of her cargo damaged. A survey on 2 July found that many of her timers and planks were completely decayed; she was found to be unseaworthy in her then present state. However, Captain Harris declared that he would undertake temporary repairs and sail to Singapore with the remainder of her cargo. On 18 July she sailed for Sincapore.

Caroline, Harris, master, reached Sincapore and was condemned there.
