= Duffus & Co. =

Ironworks company and ship builders in 19th century Aberdeen

George Duffus & Co.
- Formerly: John Duffus & Co.
- Industry: Ironworks; Shipbuilding
- Defunct: 1846
- Headquarters: Aberdeen, Scotland, United Kingdom

John Duffus & Co., then George Duffus & Co. was an Aberdeen iron-works and shipbuilding company. The George Duffus company cast the iron parts for Shakkin' Briggie (1836), and also built Aberdeen's first paddle steamer, The Queen of Scotland (1827), the first steamship on the Aberdeen-London service. Duffus & Co. ceased business in 1846.
