= Caroline Street =

Caroline Street may refer to:

- Caroline Street (Hamilton, Ontario), Canada
- Caroline Street (Cardiff), Wales
- Caroline Street (Baltimore), United States
  - Caroline Street Line
- Caroline Street (Key West), United States
