= Caroline (1800 ship) =

British merchant ship 1800–1864

History

Great Britain
- Name: Caroline
- Builder: Ipswich
- Launched: 1799, or 1800
- Fate: Last listed 1864

General characteristics
- Tons burthen: 453, or 468, or 473 (bm)
- Armament: 1800: 4 × 12-pounder carronades; 1812: 6 × 6-pounder guns + 2 × 18-pounder carronades

Caroline was launched in 1799, or 1800, at Ipswich. She had an unusually long service life of almost 60 years. She spent the first 40 years or so as a West Indiaman. She then spent the remainder of her career trading more widely, particularly with Quebec. She was last listed in 1864 with minimal data unchanged since 1859.

== Career ==
Caroline first appeared in Lloyd's Register (LR) in 1800.

Year	Master	Owner	Trade	Source & notes
1800	S.Hayes	R.Neave	London–St Kitts	LR
1805	S.Hayes	Neave & Co.	London–St Kitts	LR
1810	Hodgson	N.Malcom	London–Jamaica	LR
1812	Hodgson; Watson	N.Malcom	London–Jamaica	LR; thorough repair 1812
1815	Hodgson	N.Malcolm	London–Jamaica	LR; thorough repair 1812
1820	Robson	N.Malcolm	London–Jamaica	LR; thorough repair 1812
1825	D.Campbell	N.Malcolm	London–Jamaica	LR; small repair 1824
1830	D.Campbell	N.Malcolm	London–Jamaica	LR; small repair 1824
1833	Campbell	Malcolm	London–Jamaica	Register of Shipping; large repair 1827, small repair 1830, small repairs 1831, & large repairs 1832
1836	Campbell	Niel & Co. MacDonald & Co.	London–West Indies	LR; small repairs 1836
1840	Campbell	Malcolm	London; London–Jamaica	LR; small repairs 1836
1845	Harris	Tullock; Frampton	Dunstable–Africa; Poole–Quebec	LR; small repairs 1843
1850	Harris	Frampton	Poole–Quebec	LR; small repairs 1846 & 1849
1855	J.Harris	Frampton	Poole	LR; small repairs 1849, 1851, & 1853
1858	J.Harris	Frampton	Poole–Quebec	LR; small repairs 1851, 1853, & 1857
1859	J.Harris	Frampton		LR
