= List of storms named Caroline =

The name Caroline was used for one tropical cyclone in the Atlantic Ocean and one in the South-West Indian Ocean.

In the Atlantic:

- Hurricane Caroline (1975) – was one of two tropical cyclones to affect northern Mexico during 1975.

In the South-West Indian:

- Tropical Storm Caroline (1972) – a weak tropical storm that affected Mozambique and South Africa.
