= Caroline (schooner) =

American schooner

History

United States
- Owner: Swain and Co, New Bedford, MA
- Fate: Disappeared in 1802

General characteristics
- Class & type: Schooner
- Tons burthen: 103 (bm)
- Complement: 11 crew, 2 passengers

Caroline was a schooner constructed in New Bedford, Massachusetts. She disappeared without trace in 1802.

Built and registered in New Bedford, she was owned by Swain and Co a New Bedford firm. She reached Sydney on 22 December 1801 under the command of St. Tuckerman. She left Sydney on 29 March 1802 with Lieutenant Neil McKellar on board who carried the dispatches from Governor Phillip Gidley King to England. Caroline was to return to New Bedford.

There was a report that she had been at Saint Mary Island, Chile in August 1802. She had sprung her mast on her way from New South Wales, and had stopped to effect repairs. After Caroline was repaired, Captain Tuckermann had sailed for his destination.

Caroline was never heard of again and was lost with McKellar, Tuckerman, and a crew of nine men.
