= Caroline Bluff =

Caroline Bluff (61°55′S 57°42′W) is a bluff lying one nautical mile (1.9 km; 1.2 mi) southeast of North Foreland, King George Island, in the South Shetland Islands. The bluff was charted and named "North Foreland Head" by Scottish geologist David Ferguson in 1921. To avoid confusion with North Foreland, the UK Antarctic Place-Names Committee rejected this name in 1960 and substituted a new one. The Hobart sealing vessel Caroline (Captain D. Taylor) visited the South Shetland Islands in 1821–22.
