= Benson (1811 ship) =

British ship

History

United Kingdom
- Name: Benson
- Owner: 1811:Benson & Co.; 1817:J.W.Buckles & Co.
- Builder: Sam Finch, Saint Patrick, Quebec
- Launched: 1811
- Fate: Condemned 1817

General characteristics
- Tons burthen: 572, or 573 (bm)
- Length: 126 ft (38 m)
- Beam: 32 ft (9.8 m)
- Depth of hold: 6 ft (1.8 m)
- Armament: 10 × 18-pounder carronades

Benson was a British ship launched at Quebec in 1811. She entered Lloyd's Register (LR) in 1813. She was condemned at Mauritius in 1817 and her loss gave rise to a notable court case.

== Career ==
Lloyd's Register in 1813 listed Benson's master as Thatcher, her owner as Benson, and her trade London transport.

On 5 July 1817 Captain "Botham" wrote from Île de France that Benson, which had been sailing from Madras to London, had had to put into port leaky and with the crew mutinous. He thought that she would be condemned. A later report stated that Benson had been surveyed and the cost of her repairs was estimated at less than 8000 dollars. A week after this report, on 20 January 1818, Lloyd's List reported that Benson had been condemned and sold. She had been surveyed, condemned, and finally sold on 21 July.

The Register General's letter dated 29 June 1819 stated that she had been condemned in the Isle of France in 1818.

== Colvin vs. Newberry ==
Before Captain George Betham left England, bound for Bengal, Thomas Starling Benson, as Benson's managing owner, on 7 June 1816 chartered Benson to Betham. At Bengal, Betham took on board on 11 March 1817 2171 bags of sugar and 191 chests of indigo for delivery to England for Colvin & Co. Betham also took on board a large quantity of wheat that during the voyage fermented, disabling Benson. Benson put into Île de France where she was surveyed and condemned. Much of her cargo of sugar, and part of the cargo of indigo, had been lost.

At Île de France Cadmus and Elizabeth took on the undamaged cargo from Benson: 500 bags of sugar and 179 chests of indigo.

Colvin and Co., the plaintiffs, sued Benson's owners for 1651 bags of sugar and 12 chests of indigo, the amount of their cargo that had been lost. Benson's owners, the defendants, argued that they had discharged themselves of all liability when they had chartered Benson to Betham, the charter being known to the plaintiffs. The Court of King's Bench ruled on 19 January 1827 for the plaintiffs that their suit could proceed and that the charter to Betham had not absolved the owners of their liability.
