= SS Queen of Scotland =

Queen of Scotland was the first steamship on the Aberdeen-London service, and the first paddle steamer built in Aberdeen's shipyards. Duffus & Co. ceased business in 1846. Launched in 1827 by Duffus & Co., the vessel was involved in an accident in 1833 at Northfleet, when the steamship ran down the 410 ton United Kingdom, a rum and sugar vessel arrived from Jamaica. Queen of Scotland, though wooden-hulled, was undamaged and continued to serve the route.

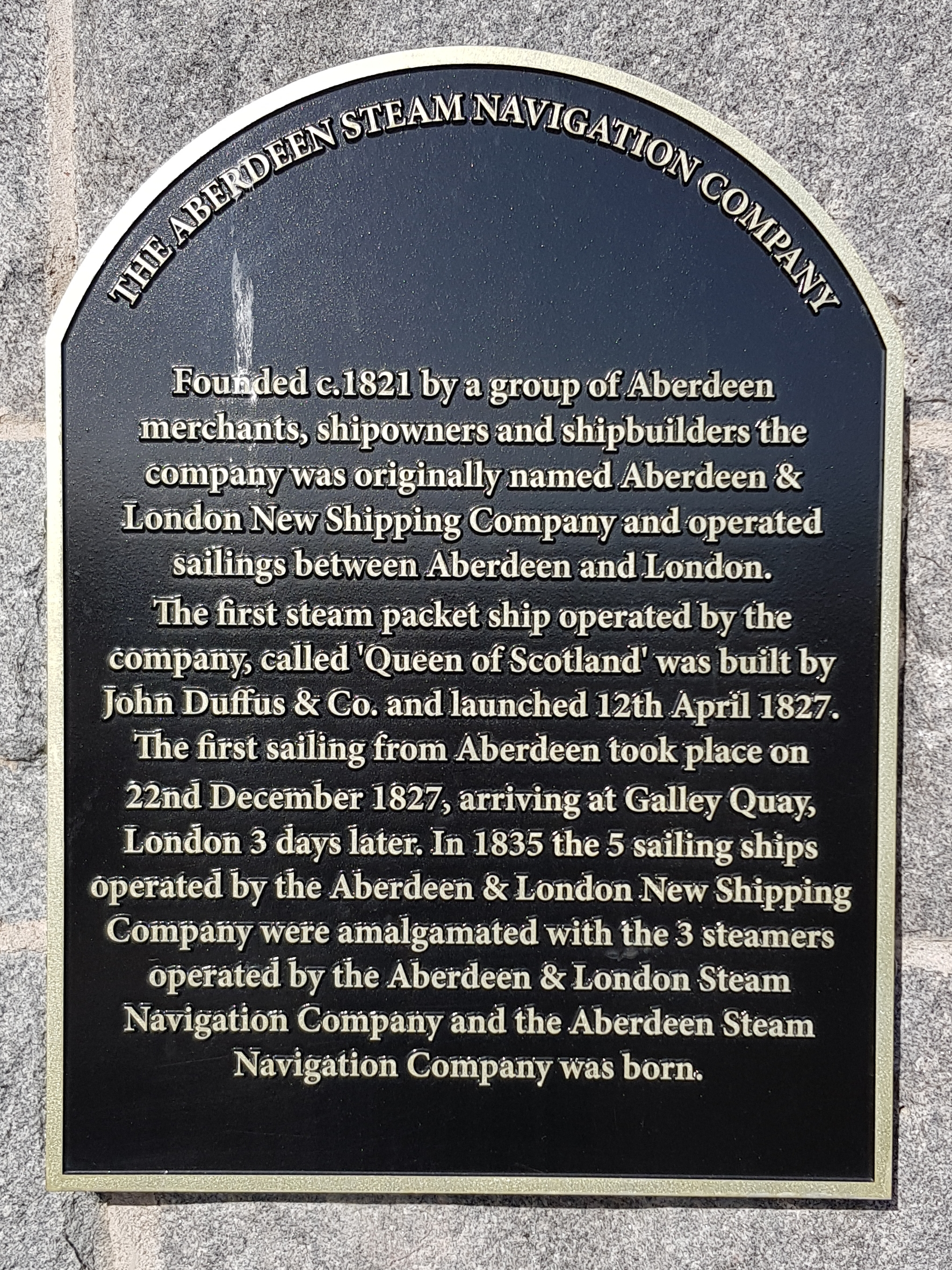
This was the first ship of the Aberdeen and London New Shipping Company, which later became the Aberdeen Steam Navigation Company.
