= Caroline (1805 ship) =

History

United Kingdom
- Name: Caroline
- Owner: 1805:Clastelin & Co.; 1812:Forbes & Co.
- Builder: John Harvey & John Foster, Fort Gloucester, Calcutta
- Launched: 29 May 1805
- Fate: Wrecked 1816
- Notes: Teak-built

General characteristics
- Tons burthen: 442, or 44278/94, or 450, or 455, or 456, (bm)
- Length: 115 ft 5 in (35.2 m)
- Beam: 30 ft 5 in (9.3 m)
- Propulsion: Sail
- Armament: 1812:8 × 12-pounder carronades; 1816:2 × 12-pounder carronades

Caroline was launched at Calcutta in 1805. She made one voyage for the British East India Company (EIC). Thereafter, she became a London-based transport, sailing between England and India under a licence from the EIC. She was wrecked in 1816.

== Career ==
Captain George Harrower sailed from Bombay on 6 November 1811, bound for England and under charter to the EIC. Caroline first sailed up to Goa, where she arrived on 11 November, and then down to Tellichery, where she arrived on 18 November. She reached the Cape of Good Hope on 6 January 1812, and Saint Helena on 14 February. She arrived at Portsmouth on 25 April, and Blackwall on 15 May.

She was admitted to the Registry of Great Britain on 3 July 1812. Caroline enters Lloyd's Register in 1812 with Patterson, master, Forbes & Co. owner, and trade London—Bengal.

On 5 February 1815 The Examiner reported that the Lord Mayor of London had investigated the charge that Captain Thomas Finney, of Caroline, had caused the death of a man named Butler John by defenestration during a voyage from Bengal to Europe. The Lord Mayor dismissed the charge; the Solicitor of the Admiralty concurred.

Lloyd's Register for 1816 carried Caroline with T. Finney, master, Forbes & Co., owner, trade London—Bombay.

== Fate ==
On 28 August 1816, Caroline foundered in the Strait of Malacca. She was on a voyage from Bengal to China. Lloyd's List referred to her as "The Caroline of Bengal".

The Register of Shipping continued to carry her with T.D. Finney, master, Forbes & Co., owner, trade London—Bengal, until 1822. Lloyd's Register continued to carry the same information until 1825. However, Caroline no longer appeared on Lloyd's Register's "Licensed and Country Ships" after the 1818 volume, where she appears as having sailed from London on 16 May 1817. The Registers were only as accurate as owners choose to keep them. The lists of licensed and country ships, however, came from the EIC.
