= Leblanc (automobile manufacturer) =

Swiss automobile manufacturer

- Industry: Automotive
- Headquarters: Zurich, Switzerland
- Products: High performance vehicles

Leblanc is a Zürich based Swiss car manufacturer. It makes modified high-performance automobiles in very low quantities. The company is just beginning to enter the American market.

== Caroline ==
The Leblanc Caroline was introduced in 1999 and is a closed LeMans-type street legal racing car with 512 bhp (382 kW), from a twin-turbo 2000 cc engine, and a weight of 785 kg. It has a top speed of 348 km/h and a 0–97 km/h time of 2.6 seconds.

== Mirabeau ==
The Leblanc Mirabeau is an open street legal race car with a rear mid-engine, rear-wheel drive layout, designed to the specifications of the FIA/Le Mans standards. The engine outputs approximately 700 horsepower (520 kW) and 850 N⋅m (630 ft⋅lbf) from a 4700 cc supercharged engine. The Mirabeau has a top speed of 370 km/h and a price tag of $650,000.
