= HMS Caroline =

Eight ships of the Royal Navy have borne the name HMS Caroline:

- HMS Caroline (1794) was a 3-gun gunvessel, formerly a barge, purchased in 1794. She was sold in 1802.
- HMS Caroline (1795) was a 36-gun fifth rate launched in 1795 and broken up in 1815.
- HMS Caroline was a 14-gun brig, formerly the French ship Affronteur, that HMS Doris captured in 1803 and that was probably broken up in 1807. Accounts differ as to whether she was commissioned or instead was a hired vessel serving the Royal Navy under contract.
- HMS Caroline (1809) was a schooner that HMS Halifax captured from the French in 1809 and that was listed until 1814.
- HMS Caroline (1856) was a wood screw gunboat of the Albacore class, launched in 1856 and broken up in 1862.
- HMS Caroline (1859) was a sailing gunboat serving in New Zealand waters. She was purchased in 1859 and sold in 1863.
- HMS Caroline (1882) was a Satellite-class composite screw corvette launched in 1882. She was reassigned to harbour service in 1897 and then became a training ship and was renamed HMS Ganges in 1908. She was renamed Powerful III in 1913 and Impregnable IV in 1919. She was finally sold in 1929.
- HMS Caroline (1914) is a C-class light cruiser launched in 1914 and decommissioned in 2011. From 1924 she served as the headquarters of the Northern Ireland division of the Royal Naval Reserve until 2010 when the division moved ashore and was recommissioned as HMS Hibernia.

== See also ==
- HMS Princess Caroline
- Caroline (ship)
