= Borneo (1817 ship) =

Merchant ship

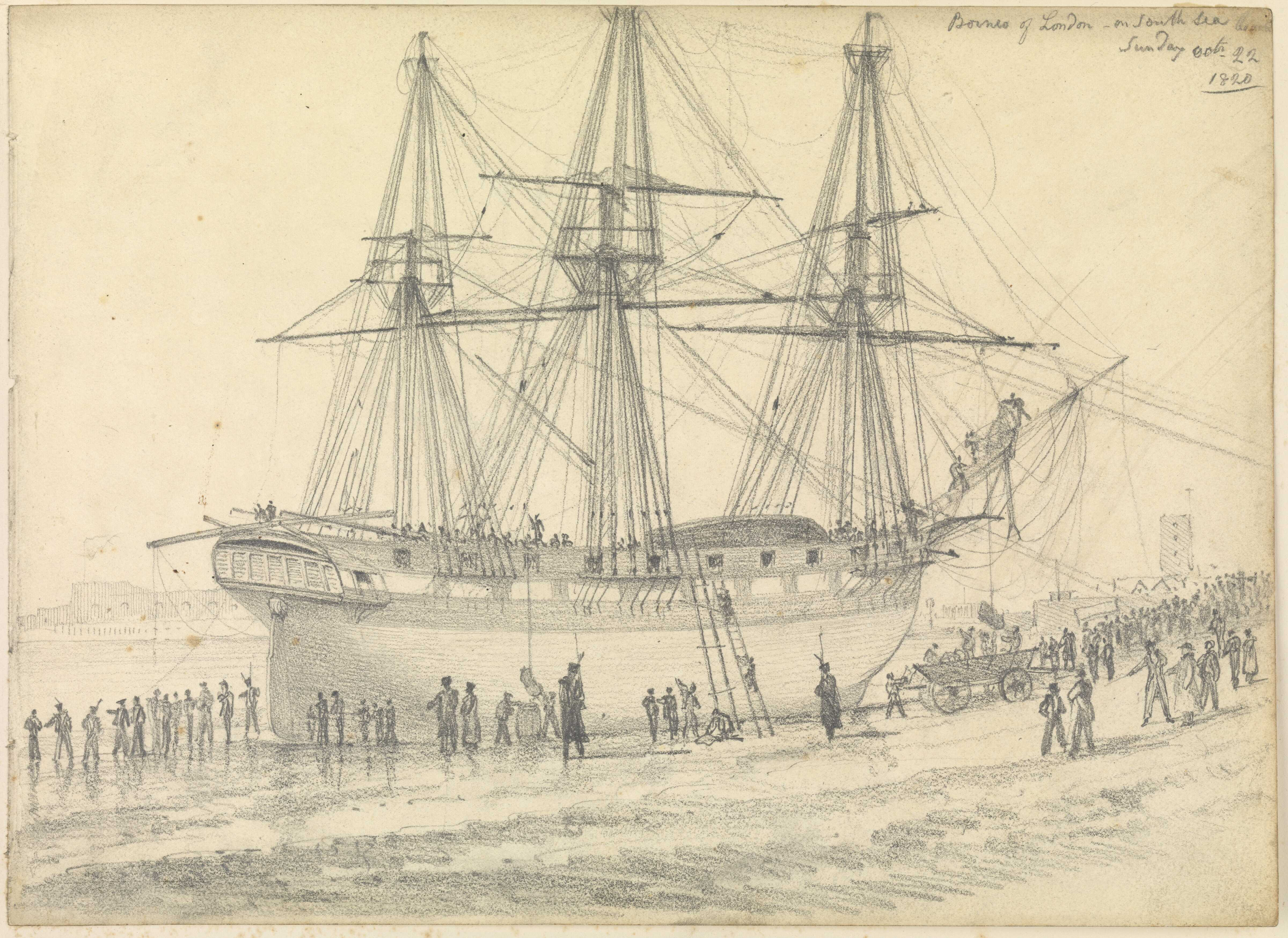
- 'Borneo' of London on Southsea beach, 22 October 1820

History

United Kingdom
- Name: Borneo
- Namesake: Borneo
- Owner: Richard Hare; later Scott & Co.
- Builder: Richard Hare, Borneo
- Laid down: June 1815; keel laid by Curaow, Borneo
- Launched: 1817, or 1818
- Fate: Wrecked 22 July 1832

General characteristics
- Tons burthen: 421, or 428, or 428 49/94 (bm)
- Length: 111 ft 2 in (33.9 m)
- Beam: 31 ft 0 in (9.4 m)
- Propulsion: Sail

Borneo was a merchant ship built in Borneo in 1817. She undertook one convict voyage to Van Diemen's Land in 1828. She was wrecked in 1832 on her first whaling voyage.

== Career ==
In 1818 Clunies-Ross was appointed captain of Borneo, a vessel "of 428 tons launched by Richard Hare in Java, which he took back to England with a cargo of spices and coffee, en route disembarking Alexander Hare at the Cape of Good Hope". (C. Ross was John Clunies-Ross).

Borneo enters Lloyd's Register in 1820 with C. Ross, master, Hare, owner, and trade Cowes. On 22 October 1820 a gale caused Borneo, Ross, master, to strand on Southsea beach at Portsmouth. She had come from Batavia and had to unload her cargo. She was gotten off on 25 October with trifling damage after about three-quarters of her cargo had been unloaded. She then went into King's Dock to effectuate repairs.

The next volume has her having received copper sheathing in 1821, and trade changing to London–Batavia.

Captain Richard M. Wichelo sailed on 11 May 1828, via Madeira and the Cape of Good Hope. Borneo arrived at Van Diemen's Land on 8 October. She had embarked 73 female convicts, of whom three died en route. On her way home, Borneo, Wichelo, master, had to put into Mauritius for repairs.

On 29 March 1831 Captain R.C. Ross sailed Borneo for the East Coast of Africa and the Seychelles on a whale hunting voyage. She was reported at St Helena on 28 August 1832, but this report was incorrect.

== Fate ==
Borneo was wrecked on 22 July 1832 on a reef east of the Comoros Islands (approx. 12°00′S 46°00′E). The crew reached Johanna in their own boat. Captain Snowden, of Cadmus, advised Cheviot on 3 July 1833 off the bottom of Japan of Borneo's loss.

The Register of Shipping for 1833 showed her with Ross, master, Scott & Co., owner, and trade London–Southern Fishery. It has the annotation "LOST" by her entry.
