= Cadmus (1813 ship) =

United Kingdom
- Name: Cadmus
- Namesake: Cadmus
- Owner: 1814:Laing & Co.; 1815:Blanchard; 1825:Sturge & Co.; 1835:Brown & Co.
- Builder: Sunderland; H. Blanchard, Monkwearmouth, (sub-contract from Philip Laing), for own account
- Launched: 28 August 1813
- Fate: Wrecked 1835

General characteristics
- Tons burthen: 376, or 376 70/94 or 381, or 382,(bm)
- Armament: 4 × 18-pounder carronades

Cadmus was launched in 1813 at Sunderland. She traded with the East Indies under license from the British East India Company (EIC) until 1827. Then between 1827 and 1834 she made two voyages as a whaler. She was lost in 1835.

== Career ==
Cadmus first appears in Lloyd's Register in 1813 with the little information beyond her burthen and place of launch. After a voyage to Jamaica, Cadmus started trading with the East Indies, primarily to Île de France, but also on to Bombay or Bengal.

In 1813 the British East India Company had lost its monopoly on the trade between India and Britain. British ships were then free to sail to India or the Indian Ocean under a licence from the EIC. Cadmus's owners applied on 20 December 1815 for a licence, which they received the next day.

For instance, Cadmus, Captain J. Dent, master, sailed from Gravesend on 24 January 1817, bound for Île de France. At Île de France Cadmus took on some of the undamaged cargo from Benson, which had arrived leaky there and been condemned. Cadmus arrived back at Gravesend on 21 January 1818.

Equally, Captain R. Appleby sailed on 28 February 1819 and on 5 April 1821 for Fort William, India.

Year	Master	Owner	Trade	Source & notes
1814	I. Taylor; J. Dent	Laing & Co.	London–Jamaica	Lloyd's Register (1814)
1815	J. Dent	Blanchard	London–Île de France	Register of Shipping (1815)
1820	R. Appleby	Blanchard	London–Île de France	Register of Shipping (1820)
1825	Snowden	Sturge & Co.	London-Quebec	Register of Shipping (1825)

In 1827 T. Sturge & Co. started to use Cadmus as a South Sea whaler.

Whaling voyage #1 (1827-1830): Captain Snowden sailed from England on 11 November 1827, bound for Timor. In April 1829 Cadmus was near Timor. Then, by March 1830 she had moved to the Bay of Islands and was whaling there, as was Woodlark, Grimes, master, and a number of other whaling ships from London, Port Jackson, and the United States. She returned to England on 4 August 1830 with 450 casks of oil.

Whaling voyage #2 (1830–1834): Captain Snowden sailed from England on 24 December 1830, bound for the Pacific Ocean. On 27 August 1831 Cadmus was off Ocean Island. She then sailed to Christmas Island. On 4 April 1832 she was near Guam.

On 21 March 1833 Cadmus was at Sydney, New South Wales, with 112 tuns of sperm oil. There she unloaded her oil for transshipment to London aboard Nelson. Cadmus left on 9 May.

On 3 July 1833 Snowden passed on the news to Cheviot that the whaler Borneo had been lost on the coast of the Seychelles.

By one report Snowden landed 14 mutinous crewmen on the Bonin Islands. He had engaged some of them at Sydney. However, another report states that Cadmus was at the Bonins between 22 and 23 August, and that the 14 men that had been landed against the wishes of the inhabitants, had come a month earlier from Harriet, Bunker, master.

On 17 November 1833 Cadmus was at Oahu. Then she was reported to have been at the Bay of Islands on 13 March 1834, and homeward bound. She returned to England on 15 October 1834 with 98 tons of oil.

Year	Master	Owner	Trade	Source & notes
1830	Snowden	Sturge & Co	London–South Seas	Register of Shipping (1830); Large repairs 1827 & 1830
1835	W. Soot (Foot)	J. Brown	Poole-North America	Lloyd's Register (1835); Small repairs 1835

== Loss ==
Cadmus was wrecked on Cape Breton Island, Nova Scotia, on 30 November 1835. She was on a voyage from Quebec City, Lower Canada to Poole, Dorset, or Prince Edward Island to Haiti.
