= Lady Hamilton (1808 ship) =

Ship

History

Denmark-Norway
- Launched: 1806
- Captured: c.1808

United Kingdom
- Name: Lady Hamilton
- Namesake: Emma, Lady Hamilton
- Acquired: 1808 by purchase of a prize
- Fate: Wrecked 11 December 1831

General characteristics
- Tons burthen: 340 (bm)
- Armament: 8 × 18-pounder guns "of the New Construction"

Lady Hamilton was a Danish vessel of another name, taken in prize. She first appeared under British ownership in 1808. She became a transport and then a whaler in the British southern whale fishery. She was wrecked in December 1831.

== Career ==
=== Transport ===
Lady Hamilton was a Danish prize. She first appeared in Lloyd's Register (LR) in 1808 with Gander, master, Gouch & Co., owners, and trade London transport.

Year	Master	Owner	Trade	Source
1810	Gainder	Gouch & Co.	London transport	LR
1815	Gander; Pritchard	Gouch & Co.	London transport	LR
1820	Pritchard	Dawson & Co	Cork; London–Jamaica	LR
1822	J.Kain	Dawson & Co.	London–South Seas	LR

=== 1st whaling voyage (1821–1824) ===
Captain J. Keen sailed from England on 25 May 1821, bound for the Pacific. In 1823 and 1824 she was reported at Tahiti and Hawaii. She returned to England on 17 November 1824 with 350 casks of whale oil.

=== 2nd whaling voyage (1824–1828) ===
Captain Maughan sailed from England on 6 March 1825. Lady Hamilton was reported to have visited Honolulu, Tahiti, and Oahu. She returned to England on 29 May 1828 with 2000 barrels or more of whale oil.

=== 3rd whaling voyage (1829–Loss) ===
The Register of Shipping for 1832 showed Lady Hamilton with Maughan, master, changing to Hayward, T.Ward, owner, and trade London–Southern Fishery. She had undergone a through repair in 1829.

Captain Hayword (or Haywood) sailed from England on 12 February 1829. She sailed via the Seychelles Bank to Socotra. In 1831 she stopped at Mauritius. The whaler L'Aigle reported on 23 May 1832 to Cheviot that Lady Hamilton had been lost in the Mozambique Channel. Her crew had been saved but her cargo of 1800 barrels of whale oil had been lost.

== Fate ==
Lady Hamilton was wrecked on 11 December 1831 in the Aldabra Islands. Her crew were rescued.
