= Caroline (1827) =

History

United Kingdom
- Name: Caroline
- Builder: Nursapore, or Cochin (Note: Nursapore, which is on India's east coast, is more probable as the launch site than Cochin, which is on India's west coast. The reason for favoring Nursapore is that Phipps was closer to the original records than Lloyd's Register.)
- Launched: 1827
- Fate: No record after 1859

General characteristics
- Tons burthen: 363, or 370 (bm)

Caroline was launched at Nursapore in 1827. Her early career as a country ship, trading east of the Cape of Good Hope, is currently obscure. From 1834 on she proceeded to make six voyages as a whaler in the southern whale fishery. She disappears from records available online in November 2023 after her return to Great Britain in 1859.

== Career ==
Caroline first appeared in Lloyd's Register in 1834. She then became a whaler in the British Southern Whale Fishery.

Year	Master	Owner	Trade	Source
1834	Meek	Wilson & Co.	London–South Seas	LR

1st whaling voyage (1834–1838): Captain Meek cleared outward bound (in ballast) on 4 October 1834 for the South Seas. Meek was still her captain in November 1835. Caroline, G.Wheeler, master, returned from the Pacific on 26 May 1838 with 220 casks of whale oil.

2nd whaling voyage (1838–1843): Captain Drybugh (or Dryborough) sailed from England on 16 August 1834. On 16 June 1841 she put into Sydney leaky, having also lost her main mast, fore and main top masts, head, and four boats, and bowsprit sprung. She had encountered a hurricane on 4–5 June at 16°S 157°E. Caroline returned on 29 September 1843 with 280 casks (160 tons), of whale oil.

Caroline last appeared in LR in 1845, suggesting that she then changed her registry from Great Britain.

Year	Master	Owner	Trade	Source & notes
1845	Wilson	Wilson	London–South Seas	LR; small repairs 1838 & 1848

3rd whaling voyage (1844-1847): Captain Wilson sailed from England on 1 April 1844. She returned on 3 September 1847 with 229 casks of whale oil and 11 casks of train (bowhead whale) oil (143 tons).

4th whaling voyage (1848–1851): Captain G. W. Andrew (or Andrews) sailed from England on 7 March 1848. Caroline returned on 21 October 1851 with 220 casks.

5th whaling voyage (1852–1855): Captain J. Trulles (or Tresslles) sailed from England on 3 February 1852. Caroline returned on 25 September 1855 with 60 casks.

6th whaling voyage (1856–1859): Captain G. Benson sailed in 1856. Caroline returned to England on 19 October 1859 with 66 casks of sperm oil.
