= Caroline (1825 ship) =

History

United Kingdom
- Name: Elizabeth
- Owner: Chapman & Co. (1831)
- Builder: John Crookenden, Cochin; C. C. Poney Guizelar, Cochin Dockyard
- Launched: April 1825
- Renamed: Caroline
- Fate: Wrecked March 1850

General characteristics
- Tons burthen: 329, or 32967/94 or 330 (bm)
- Length: 102 ft 3 in (31.2 m)}; 106 ft 3 in (32.4 m)}
- Beam: 26 ft 10 in (8.2 m); 26 ft 7 in (8.1 m)}
- Depth: 6 ft 8 in (2.0 m)}
- Propulsion: Sail
- Complement: 22
- Armament: 6 guns
- Notes: Two decks & three masts; coppered 1829

Caroline was built at Cochin, British India, in 1825. She sailed to the United Kingdom and took up British registry. She then sailed between England and India under a license from the British East India Company (EIC). She made one voyage transporting convicts from Ireland to Australia. Later, she carried immigrants to Australia. She was wrecked in March 1850.

== Design ==
Caroline was built by John Crookenden and was registered at Calcutta on 21 November 1825. She was built of teak, was sheathed in yellow metal, and had two decks. She had three masts and was square rigged.

== Career ==
Caroline first appeared in Lloyd's Register (LR) in 1827.

Year	Master	Owner	Trade	Source
1827	R.Hare	Chapman	London	LR
1829	R.Hare; Fewson	Chapman	London	LR

A ship named Caroline, under the command of Captain Howey, left London on 19 April 1828 and arrived in Sydney on 12 September 1828, carrying a cargo of general merchandise, livestock, and passengers including immigrants. Another source states that the ship sailed from Plymouth, also on 19 April 1828, under the command of Captain Howard.

Under the command of James Fewson, she left St Katharine Docks, London on 2 June 1829, stopping at Worthing, Sussex on 4 June to load additional cargo. She left on 6 June and after stopping over at Rio de Janeiro, arrived at the Swan River Colony on 12 October. She was carrying some 66 passengers.

Year	Master	Owner	Trade	Source
1830	Fewson	Chapman	London–New South Wales	LR
1832	Fewson	Chapman	London–Mauritius	LR

Caroline left British registry c. 1833.

On her only convict voyage, Caroline, under the command of Alexander Macdonald and surgeon George Birnie, she departed Cork, Ireland on 15 April 1833 and arrived in Sydney on 6 August. She embarked 120 female convicts, none of whom died en route.

She returned to British registry in 1836. She carried immigrants and passengers to Adelaide Port Philip on some of her voyages.

Year	Master	Owner	Trade	Source & notes
1836	William	Stainbank	London	LR
1838	William	Stainbank	London–Sydney	LR
1840	Williams	Stainbank	London–Sydney; Port Philip	LR; small repairs 1838
1848	Williams; W.Parry	Stainbank; C.Parry	London–Mauritius; London–Port Philip	LR; small repairs 1838 & 1849
1850	W.Perry	C.Perry	London–Port Philip	LR; small repairs 1849

== Fate ==
A report from Honolulu dated 26 March 1850 reported that Caroline, Perry, master, had wrecked in a gale. She had been sailing from Adelaide to California. Her passengers were saved, as were all but one of her crew.
