= French ship Caroline (1785) =

History

France
- Name: Caroline

Caroline was a 200-ton ship. On 19 October 1785, under the command of Captain Nicolas Baudin, she left Nantes, France, transporting 80 Acadians to Louisiana. She landed them at New Orleans on 17 December 1785.
