= Beek en Donk =

- Town
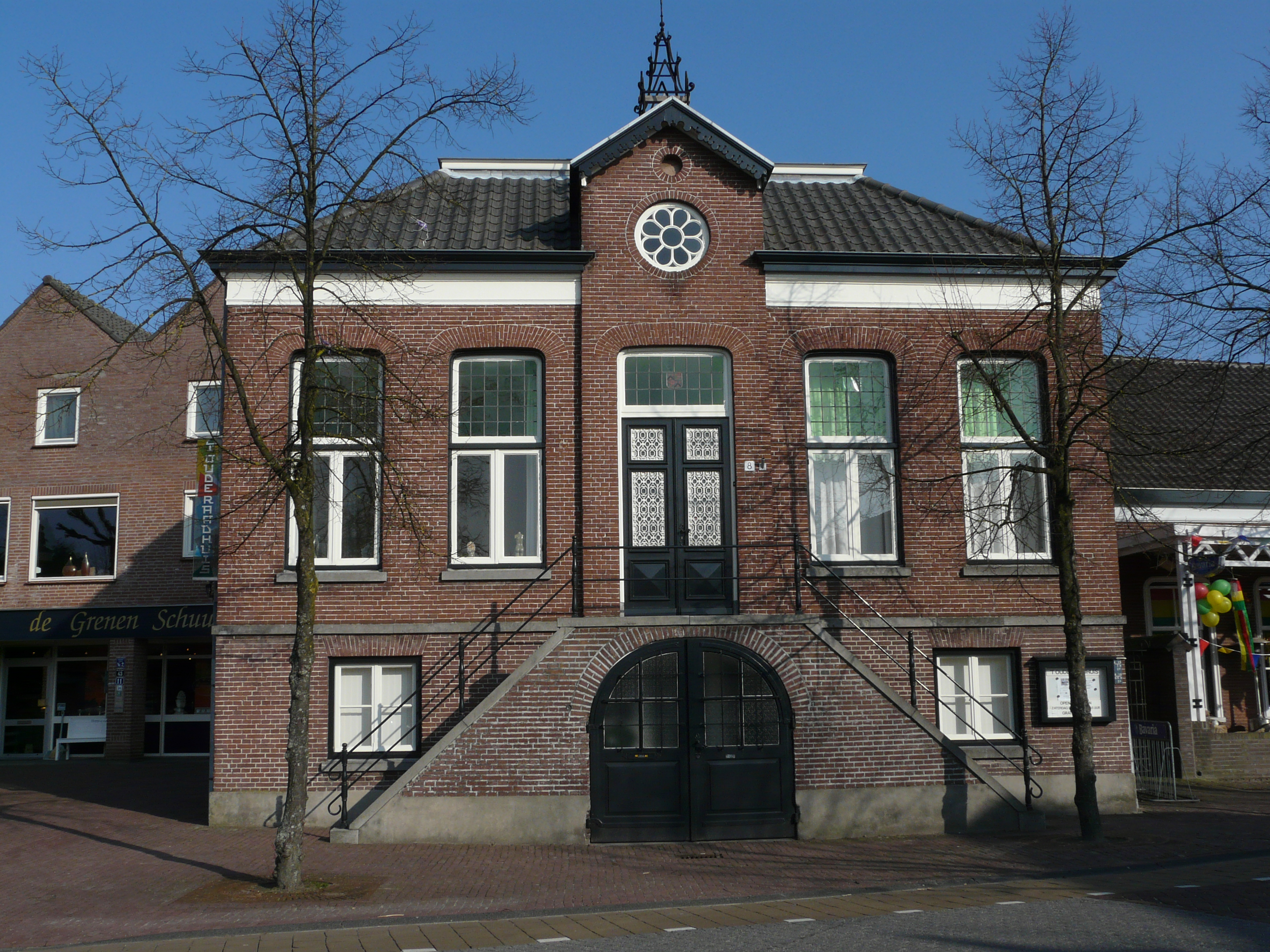
- Former town hall of the municipality Beek en Donk

- Flag Coat of arms

- Location in the province of North Brabant in the Netherlands Beek en Donk (Netherlands)
- Coordinates: 51°32′5″N 5°37′49″E
- Country: Netherlands
- Province: North Brabant
- Municipality: Laarbeek

Area
  - Total: 16.80 km^{2} (6.49 sq mi)
- Elevation: 14 m (46 ft)

Population (2021)
  - Total: 10,745
  - Density: 639.6/km^{2} (1,657/sq mi)
- Time zone: UTC+1 (CET)
  - Summer (DST): UTC+2 (CEST)
- Postal code: 5740, 5741
- Dialing code: 0492

Beek en Donk is a town in the province North Brabant, Netherlands. There are 10,028 inhabitants. The spoken language is Peellands (an East Brabantian dialect, which is very similar to colloquial Dutch).

== History ==
The area of nowadays Beek en Donk has been inhabited for a long time. Tools of Stone Age nomadic people have been found. The first permanent inhabitants come around 700 AD. In the Middle Ages, the basis was made for the current towns. First Beek grew around the Oude Toren, and Heereind. In the 13th century, the role of Heereind was taken over by the expanding Donk. Heereind is noted in a document in 1314, where it was given the same importance as Aarle, Rixtel and Beek. On Saint Barbara day (December 4) in 1300, duke Jan II of Brabant gave the inhabitants of 'Rikestele, Arle ende Beke' (Rixtel, Aarle and Beek) the right to use common lands around the towns. In the 14th century, Beek en Donk got its first church. In 1809, it was demolished, but the tower remains, as the Oude Toren (old tower)

During the reign of Johanna van Brabant, Beek, together with Aarle and Stiphout, was sold to Dirk de Roovere, for 1.700 gulden. In later ages, the area changed owners a few times, until in 1798 the feudal system was abolished, inspired by the French revolution.

During the Eighty Years' War, the town suffered from passing enemy armies. After the war, Beek en Donk remained poor. Only in the late 18th century, when there was more land cultivated, the situation slowly got better. In the 19th century, the town started to develop more. In 1836 the Zuid-Willemsvaart canal was dug by hand, and in 1880-1881, the steam tram between Den Bosch and Helmond was built, having a stop in Beek en Donk. The tram was broken up later; the canal still remains.

In 1997, Beek en Donk, Lieshout, Aarle-Rixtel and Mariahout formed the municipality Laarbeek. The town hall of Beek en Donk serves as the town hall of the new municipality.

In 2020, at a future construction site in Beek en Donk, phosphor was found in the ground at the site, dating back to explosives used by Germans during World War II. The construction was postponed.

== Gallery ==
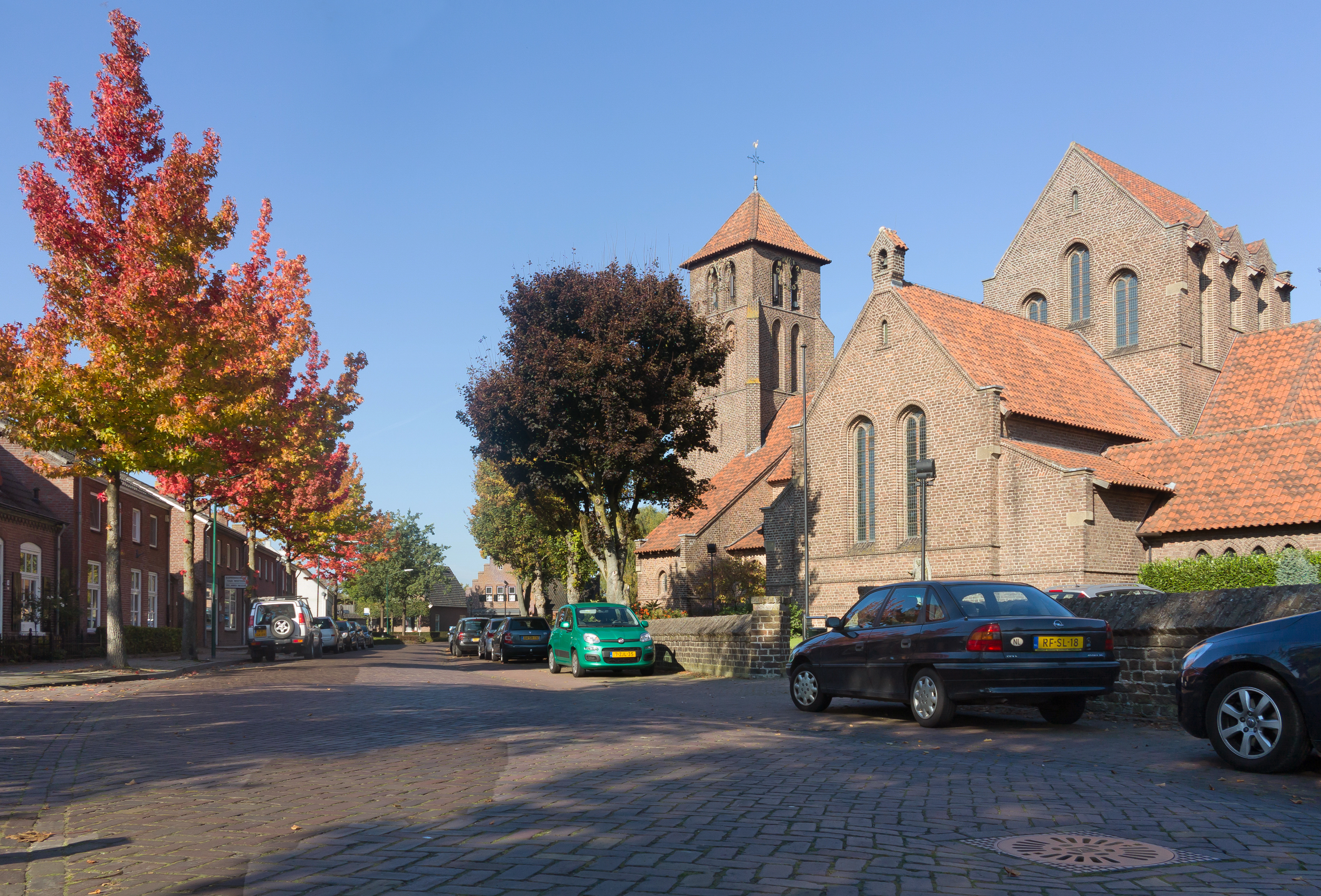
Church (de Sint Michaëlkerk)

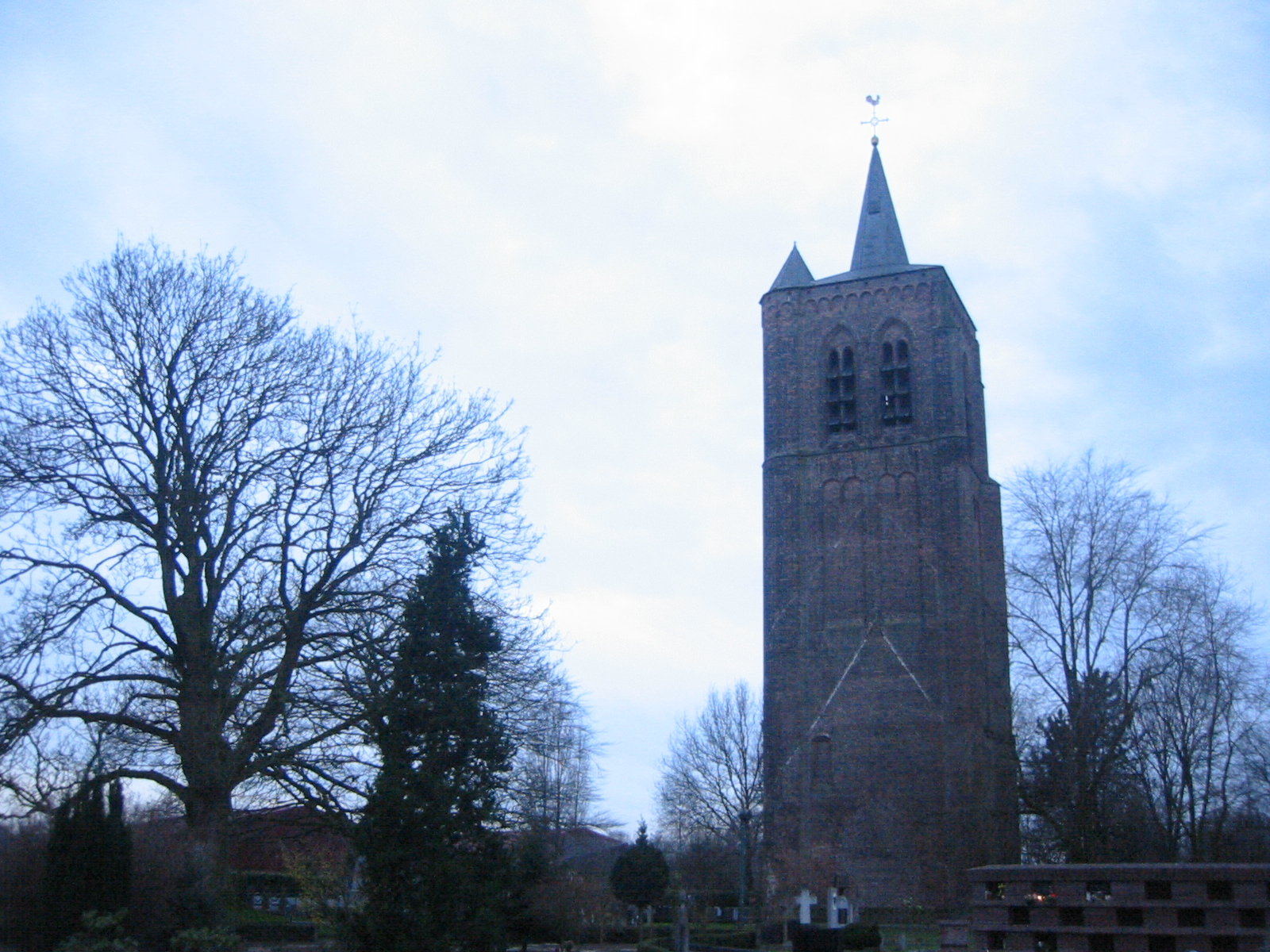
Oude Toren (Old Belfry)

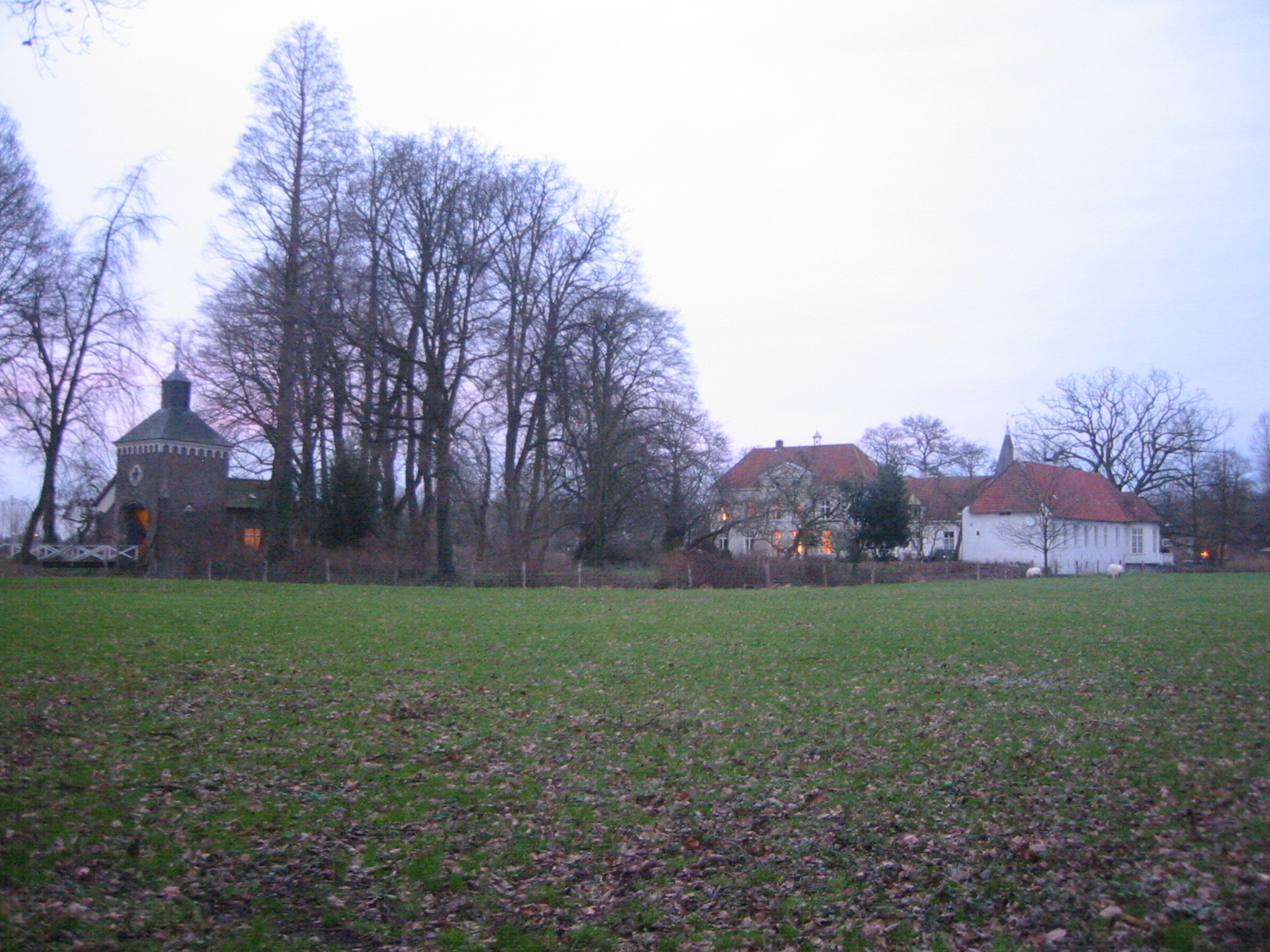
Castle Eyckenlust

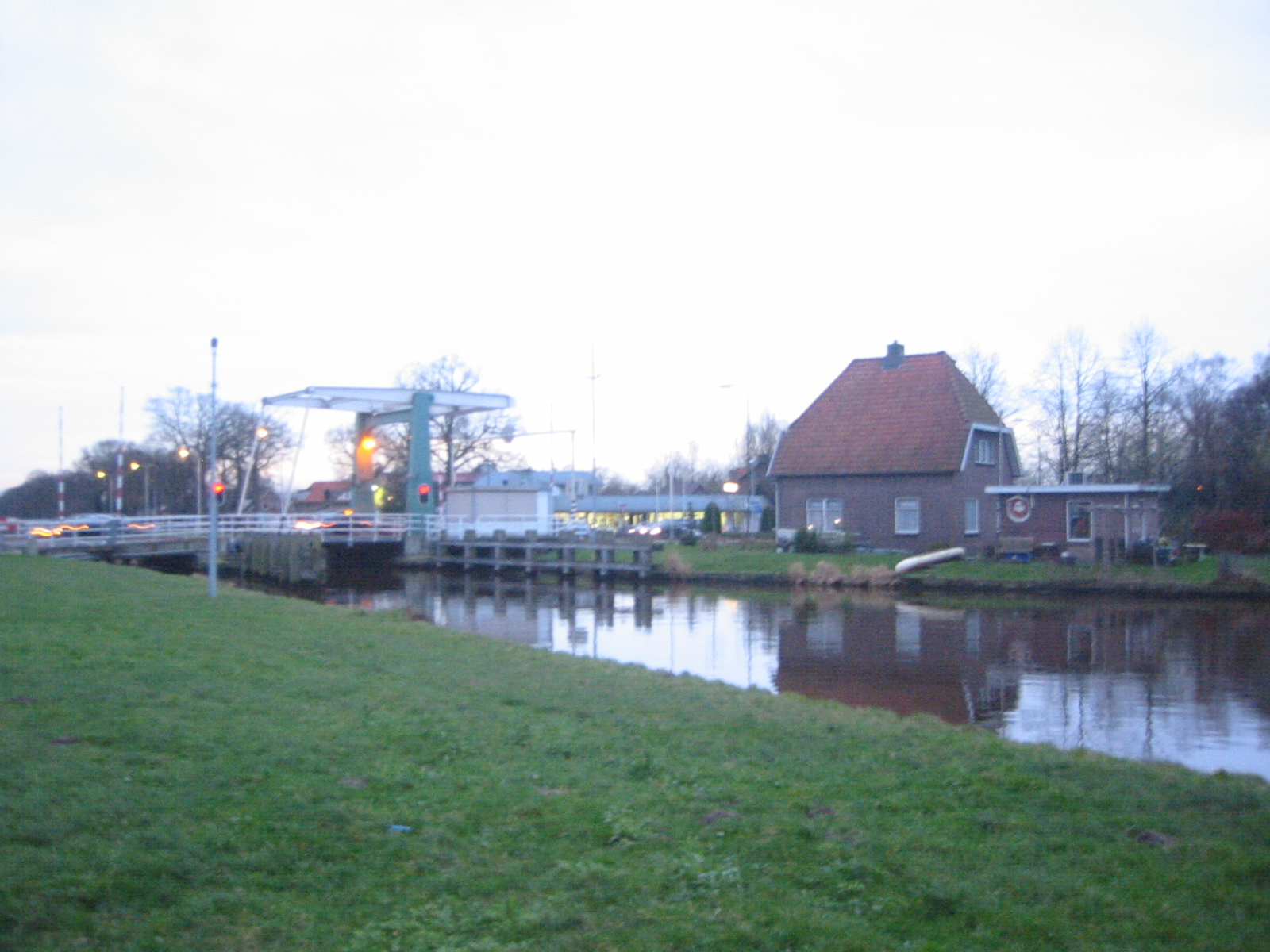
Bridge over Zuid Willemsvaart
