= Laarbeek =

- Municipality
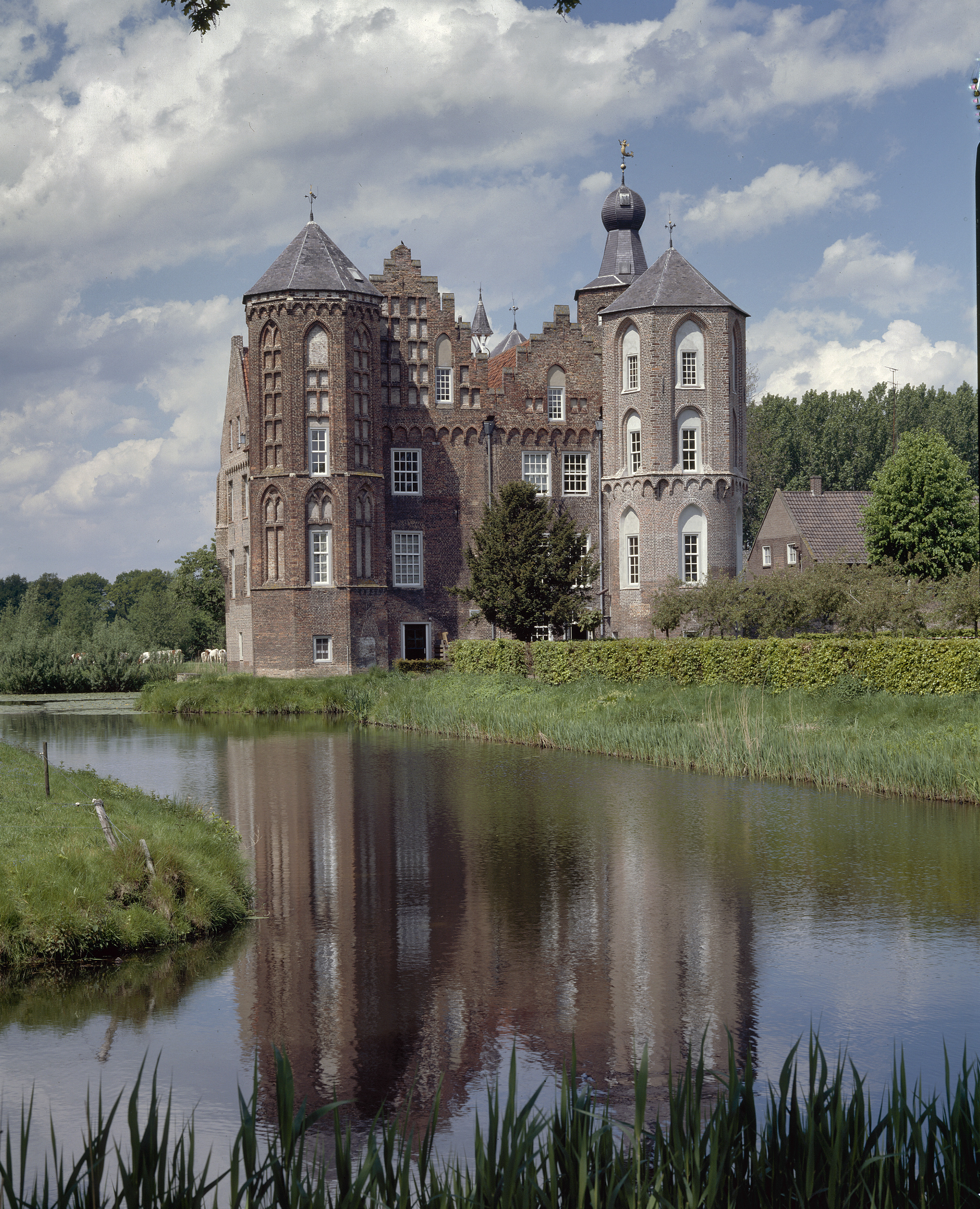
- Croy Castle

- Flag Coat of arms

- Location in North Brabant
- Coordinates: 51°32′N 5°38′E
- Country: Netherlands
- Province: North Brabant
- Established: 1 January 1997

Government
  - Body: Municipal council
  - Mayor: Lianne van der Aa (CDA)

Area
  - Total: 56.17 km^{2} (21.69 sq mi)
  - Land: 55.35 km^{2} (21.37 sq mi)
  - Water: 0.82 km^{2} (0.32 sq mi)
- Elevation: 14 m (46 ft)

Population (January 2021)
  - Total: 22,805
  - Density: 412/km^{2} (1,070/sq mi)
- Time zone: UTC+1 (CET)
  - Summer (DST): UTC+2 (CEST)
- Postcode: 5735–5741
- Area code: 0492, 0499
- Website: www.laarbeek.nl

Laarbeek (Dutch pronunciation: [ˈlaːrbeːk]) is a municipality located in the province of North Brabant in the south of the Netherlands. It was formed in 1997 from the former municipalities Beek en Donk, Aarle-Rixtel and Lieshout (which included the village Mariahout). Laarbeek is part of the city region 'Samenwerkingsverband Regio Eindhoven', centered on the city of Eindhoven. The town hall is located in Beek en Donk.

Lieshout is home of the Bavaria Brewery, one of the Netherlands' largest breweries which produces for local and foreign markets.

The Croy Castle is located near the village Aarle-Rixtel.

== Population centres ==
- Aarle-Rixtel
- Achterbosch
- Beek en Donk
- Beemdkant
- Broek
- De Hei
- Deense Hoek
- Ginderdoor
- Groenewoud
- Heikant
- Het Hool
- Het Laar
- 't Hof
- Kruisschot
- Lieshout
- Mariahout
- Scheepstal
- Strijp
- Wolfsputten

== Politics ==
=== Municipal government ===
After the 2026 municipal election, the municipal council of Laarbeek had six parties.

Party	Seats
Partij Nieuw Laarbeek	7 / 19
Algemeen Belang Laarbeek	4 / 19
Christian Democratic Appeal	2 / 19
Ouderen Appèl - Hart voor Laarbeek	2 / 19
De Werkgroep	2 / 19
Progressief Nederland	2 / 19

As of May 2026, the municipal executive consists of three coalition parties: Partij Nieuw Laarbeek (PNL), Algemeen Belang Laarbeek (ABL) and De Werkgroep (DWG).

Municipal Executives
Name	Portfolio	Party
Lianne van der Aa	Mayor	CDA
Ron van den Berkmortel	First Deputy Mayor	PNL
Monika Slaets-Sonneveldt	Second Deputy Mayor	ABL
Nicole Otten	Third Deputy Mayor	DWG
Ton van de Wijdeven	Fourth Deputy Mayor	PNL

== Topography ==
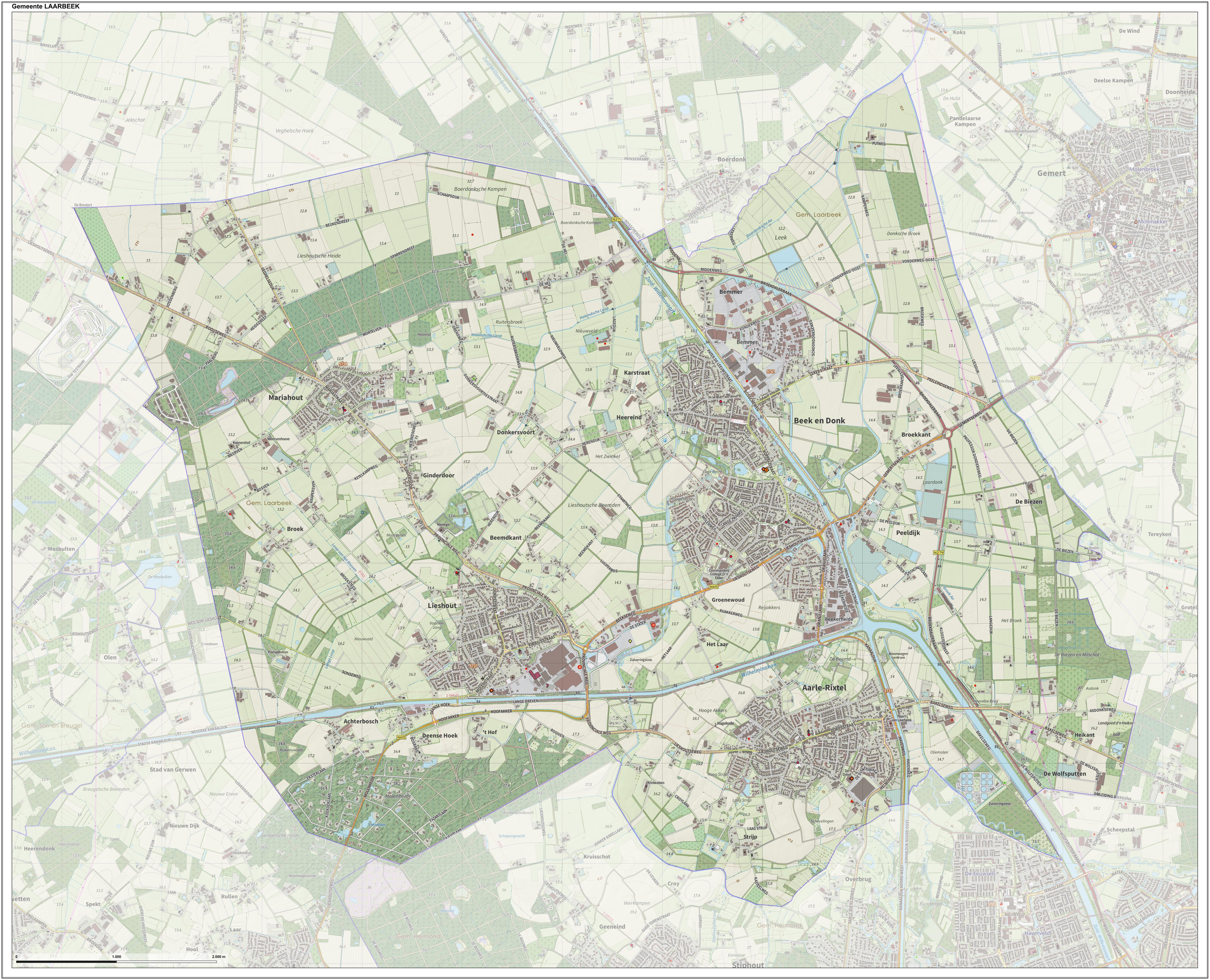
Map of the municipality of Laarbeek, June 2015.

== Notable people ==
- Arnoldus Arlenius (ca.1510–1582) a Dutch humanist philosopher and poet
- Eustáquio van Lieshout (1890 in Aarle-Rixtel – 1943) a Dutch RC missionary in Brazil
- Guus Meeuwis (born 1972 in Mariahout) a Dutch singer-songwriter
- Bram Zwanen (born 1998 in Aarle-Rixtel) a Dutch footballer

== Gallery ==
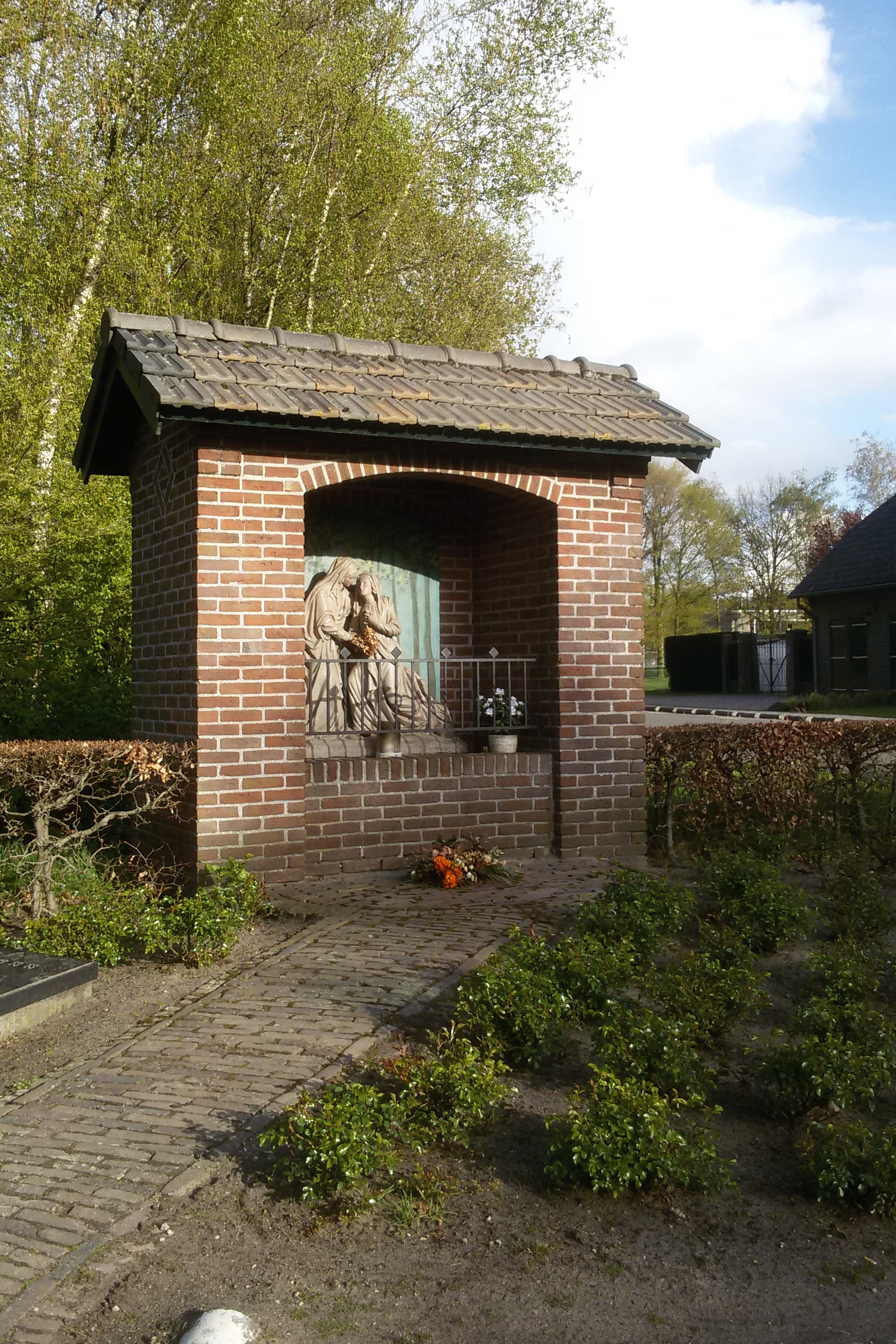
Aarle-Rixtel Veldkapel Bakelseweg

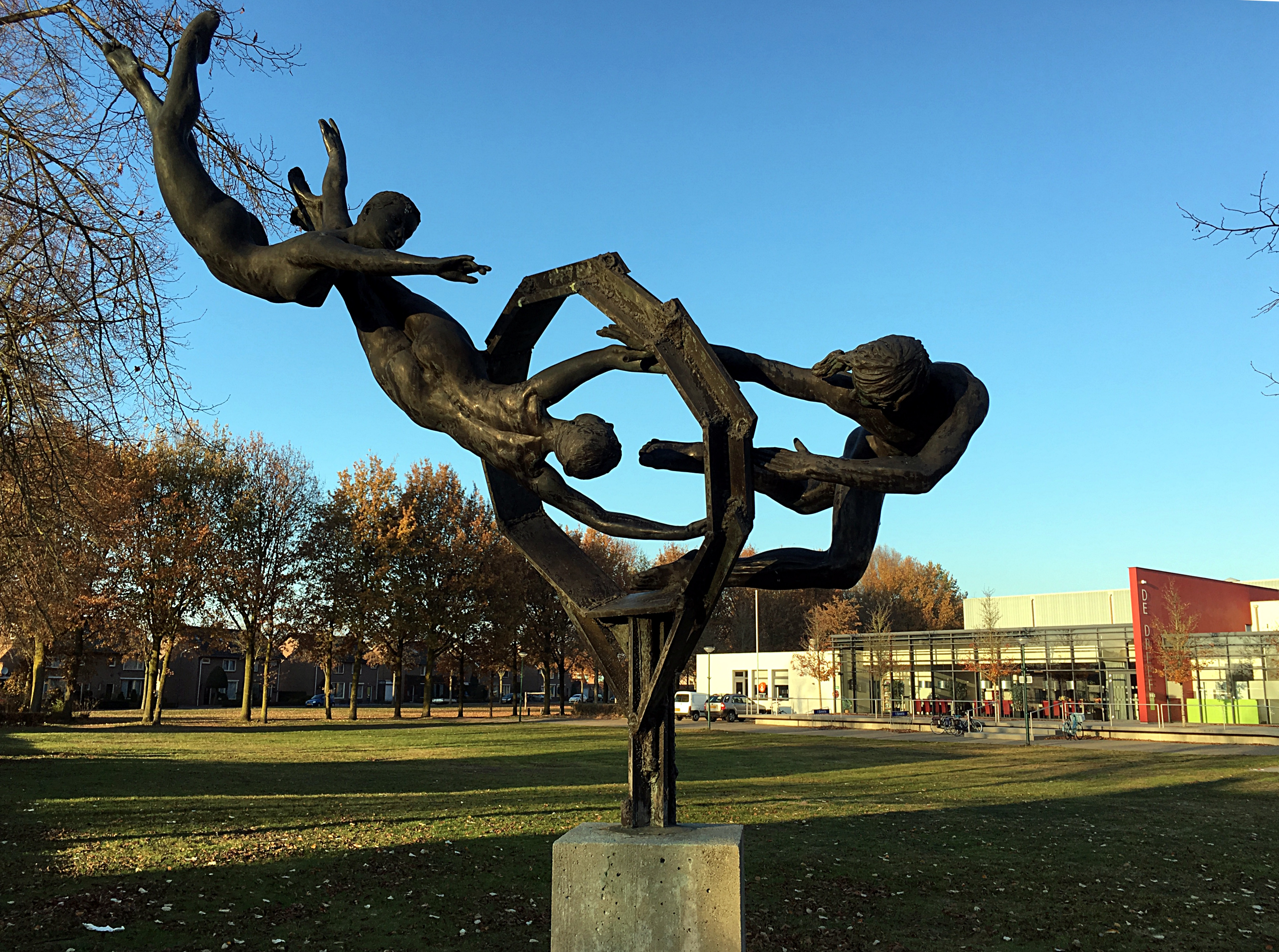
Aarle-Rixtel Contraction

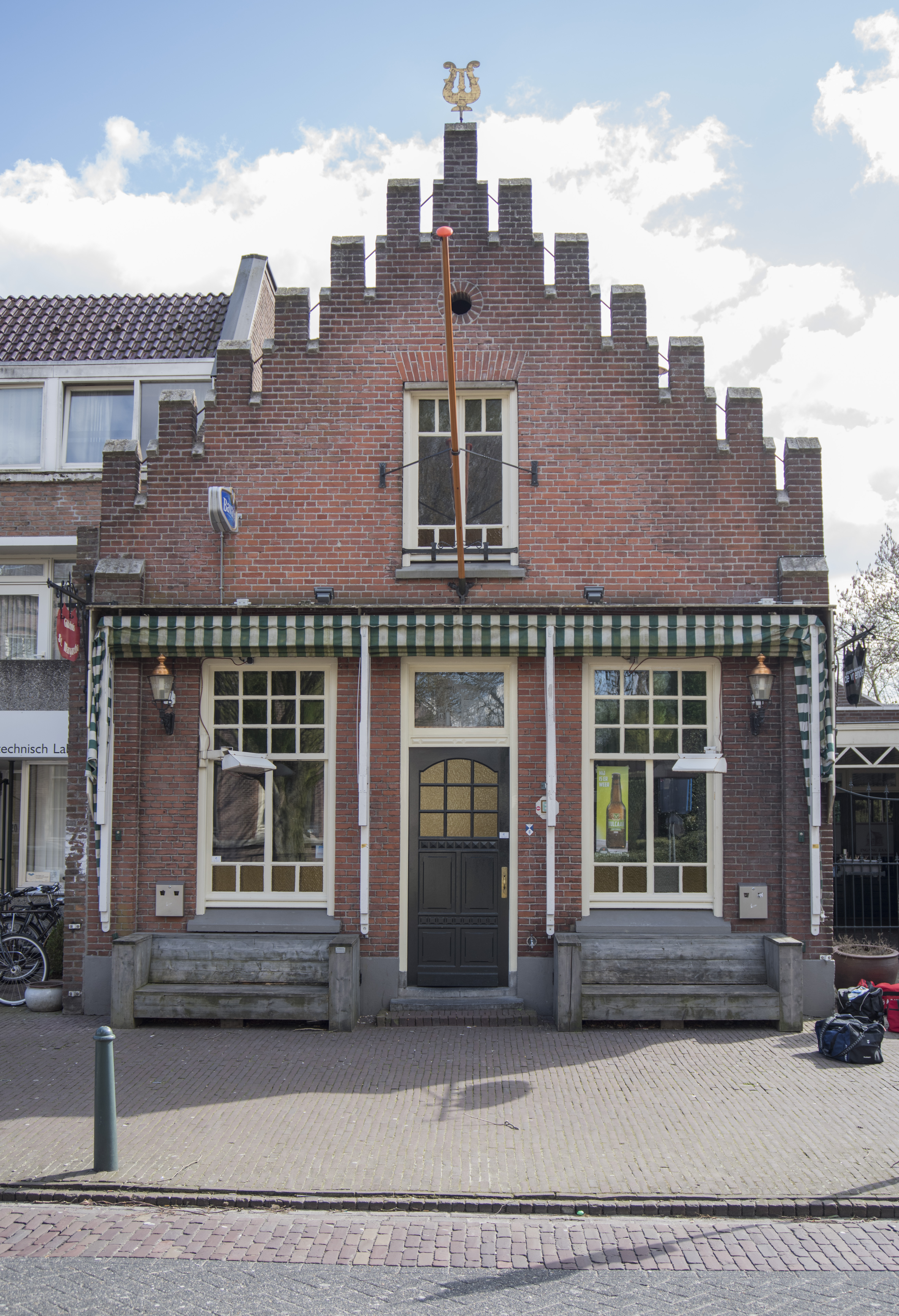
Aarle-Rixtel Cafe Dorpstraat

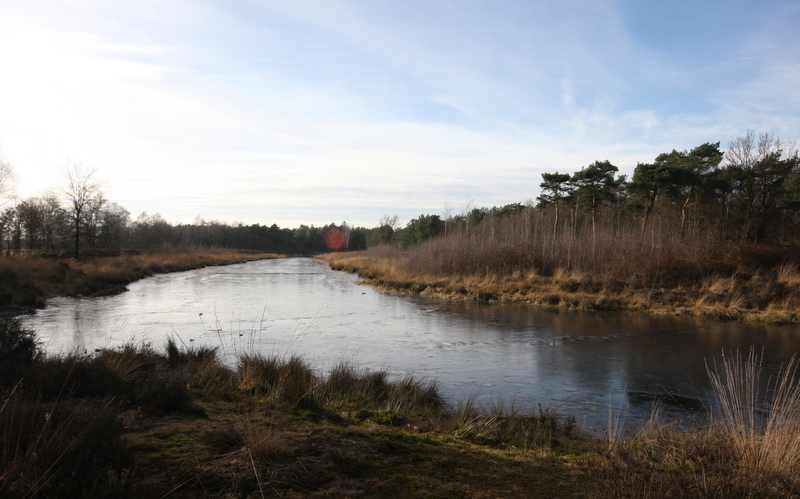
Mariahout Torrenven - panoramio

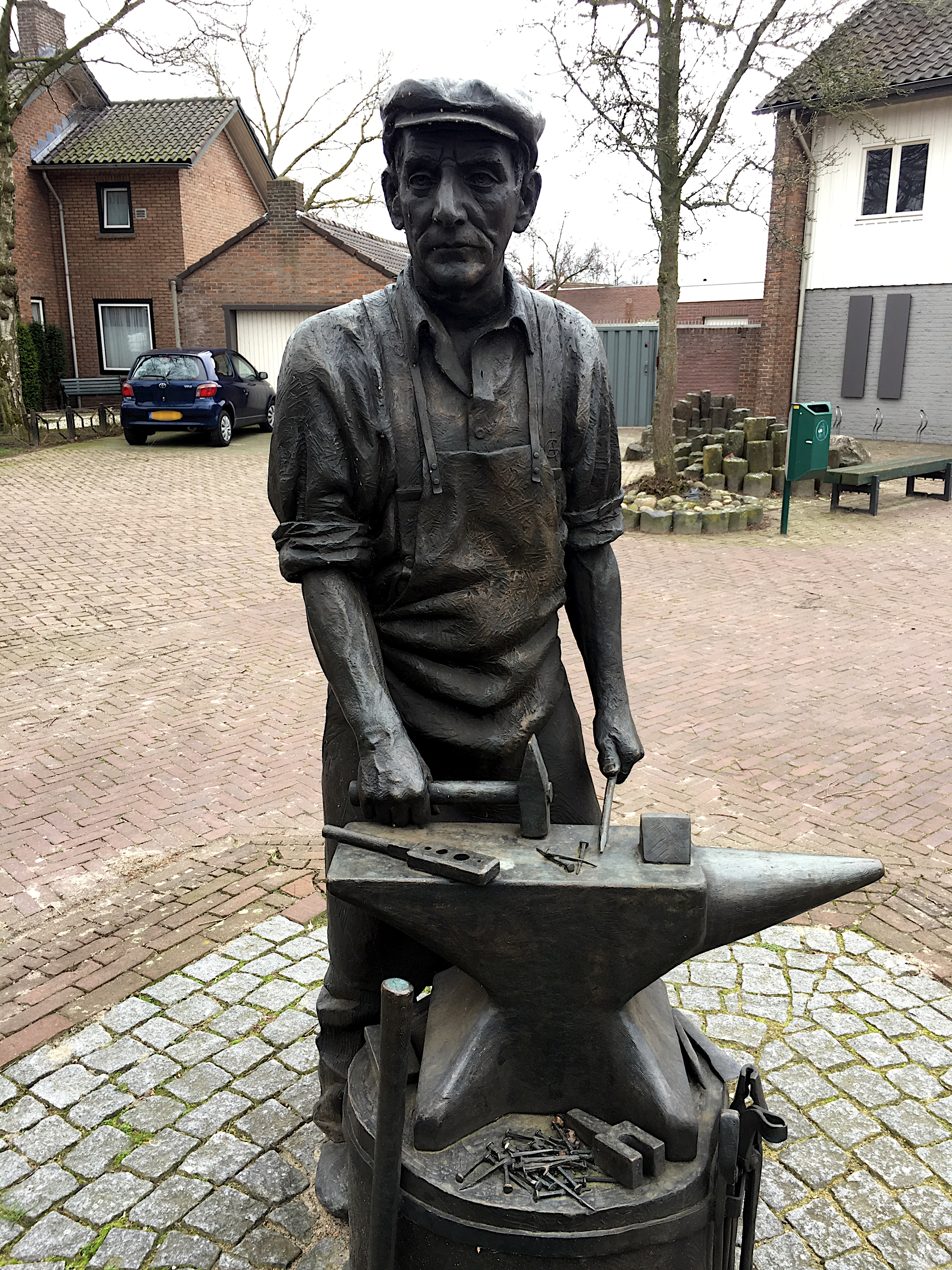
Beek en Donk De Spijkermaker
