= Swinkels =

Swinkels is a Dutch toponymic surname. It is a contraction of des winkels, literally meaning "from the corner" (see Winkel (surname)). Notable people with the surname include:

- Arjan Swinkels (born 1984), Dutch football defender
- Eric Swinkels (born 1949), Dutch sports shooter
- Henri Swinkels (born 1963), Dutch politician
- Joannes Baptista Swinkels (1810–1875), Dutch apostolic vicariate of Suriname
- Johannes Franciscus Swinkels (1851–1950), Dutch brewer
- Jolande Swinkels (born 1966), Dutch sports shooter
- Judith Swinkels (born 1961), Dutch politician
- Karlijn Swinkels (born 1998), Dutch road cyclist
- Robin Swinkels (born 1989), Dutch chess player
- Ruud Swinkels (born 1987), Dutch football goalkeeper
- Sil Swinkels (born 2004), Dutch football defender
- Sylvie Swinkels (born 2000), Dutch road cyclist
