= Heikant, Laarbeek =

Heikant
- Hamlet
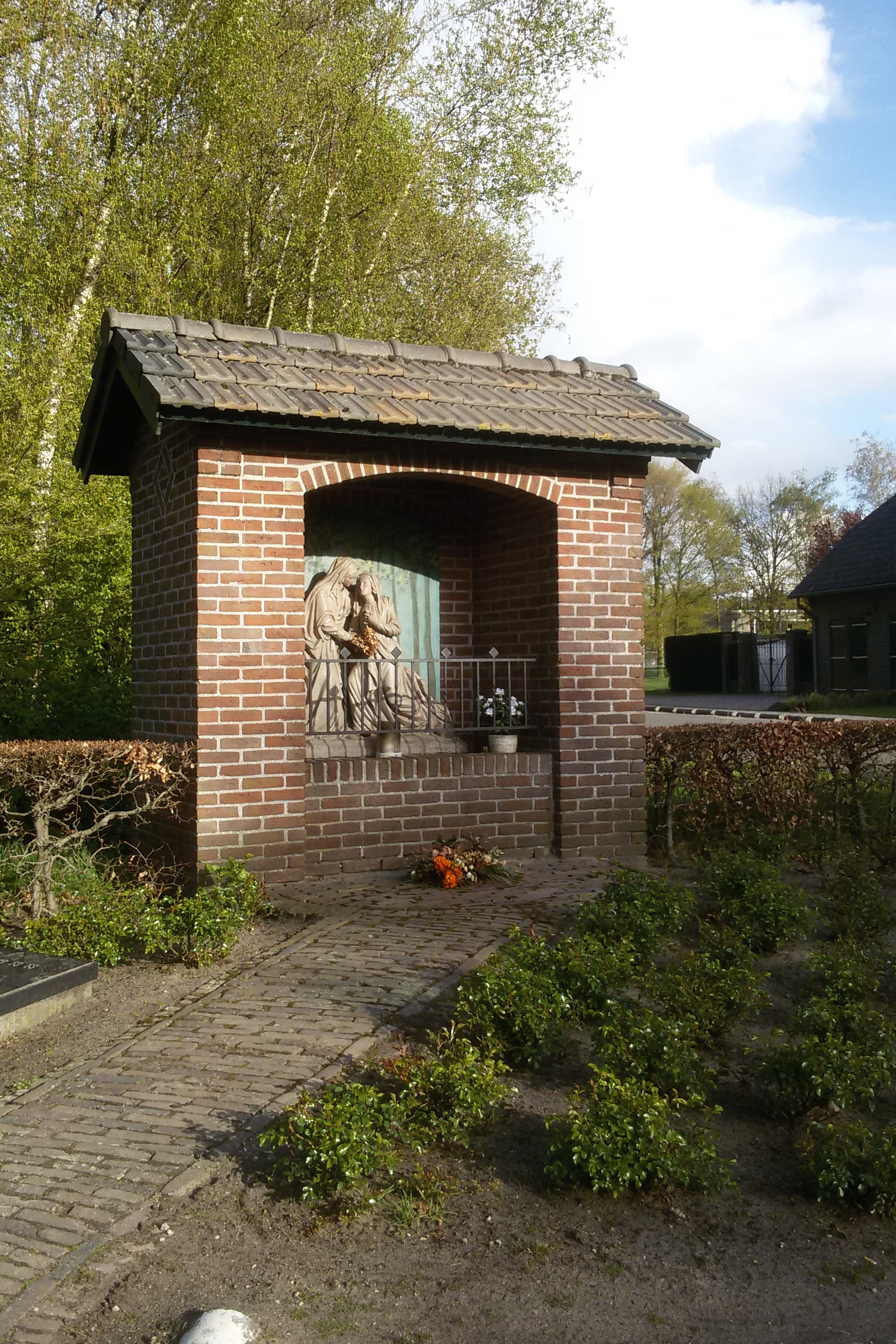
- Chapel in Heikant

- Location in the province of North Brabant in the Netherlands Heikant (Netherlands)
- Coordinates: 51°30′36″N 5°40′25″E
- Country: Netherlands
- Province: North Brabant
- Municipality: Laarbeek

Area
  - Total: 7.03 km^{2} (2.71 sq mi)

Population (2021)
  - Total: 295
  - Density: 42.0/km^{2} (109/sq mi)
- Time zone: UTC+1 (CET)
  - Summer (DST): UTC+2 (CEST)
- Postal code: 5735
- Dialing code: 0492

Heikant is a hamlet in the municipality of Laarbeek, in the Dutch province of North Brabant. It is located about 3 km east of Aarle-Rixtel.

Heikant has a population of about 295; this includes a large part of the surrounding countryside. Heikant has no place name signs, but there is a golf course.
