= Croy Castle =

Castle in the Netherlands

- Stiphout, the Netherlands
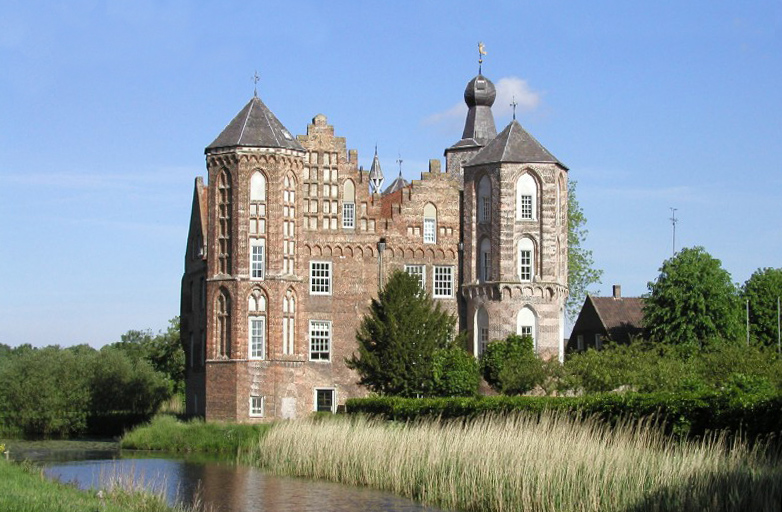
- Croy Castle

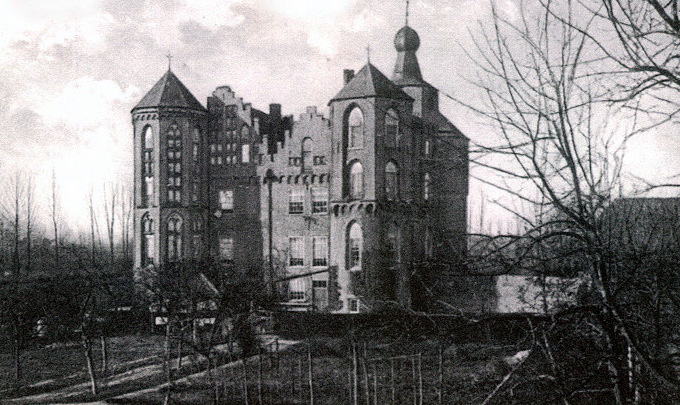
- Croy Castle (19th century)

Site information
- Type: Castle
- Open to the public: No, office building
- Condition: Good

Location
- The Netherlands
- Coordinates: 51°30′00″N 5°37′26″E

Site history
- Built: 15th century
- Materials: Brick

The Croy Castle is a castle in the Dutch province North Brabant, near the village Aarle-Rixtel which is part of the municipality of Laarbeek. From 1642 until 1968 Croy belonged to the municipality Stiphout (currently part of the municipality of Helmond).

The castle is currently no longer inhabited but in use as an office.
Since 1795 beer is brewed near the castle. Since 2004 the Croy beer itself has been brewed in Belgium but the ingredients are grown on the Croy estate. The destruction of the restaurant by fire in 2006 brought with it the opportunity to restore the tradition of brewing beer on the Croy estate. With the renovation of the nearby restaurant "de Croyse Hoeve" the microbrewery was built and with it the production has returned to Aarle-Rixtel. Due to environmental restrictions the beer is still bottled and packaged in Belgium. Also there is a herd of Rambouillet-Merino sheep on the Croy estate.

== History ==
The oldest parts of the Croy Castle were probably built in the 15th century. There is not much known about the history of the castle. Jacob van Croÿ, Bishop of Cambrai was in 1477 owner of the land, but a house is not mentioned. In the 16th century villages in the neighbourhood were many times demolished, probably also the castle (but this is not recorded).

The last inhabitant was Freule (Lady) Constance van der Brugghen. Her uncle bought Croy in 1772, In 1773 he died and left the castle to his half brother Johan Karel Gideon. He married Margaretha Gertuda Falck and they had three sons and a daughter. In 1820, 1826 and 1864 the sons died. Freule (Lady) Constance van der Brugghen died in 1873 (78 years old) and left the building to municipality of Stiphout with the obligation to use the building for the help of poor elderly people. This was led by the sisters of Geloof, Hoop en Liefde (Faith, Hope and Love). In 1977 the house was disapproved as being a house for elderly people because of safety regulations.

Research of the castle points that the size was more or less the same all those years. The building history seems complex but not much is known from written sources. It seems that the original building has been severely damaged. The cellar, the right wing and the round tower are probably from the beginning of the construction. The last changes e.g. the entrance and the Crow-stepped gable were built in the 18th century.
Many noble families have lived in the castle.

== See also ==
- House of Croy
- List of castles in the Netherlands
