= Eustáquio van Lieshout =

Dutch missionary

Blessed Eustáquio van Lieshout SS.CC.
- Born: 3 November 1890; Aarle-Rixtel, North Brabant, Netherlands
- Died: 30 August 1943 (aged 52); Belo Horizonte, Minas Gerais, Brazil
- Venerated in: Roman Catholic Church
- Beatified: 15 June 2006, Belo Horizonte, Brazil by Cardinal José Saraiva Martins, C.M.F., for Pope Benedict XVI

Eustáquio van Lieshout, SSCC (also Eustachius or Eustache; 3 November 1890 – 30 August 1943) was a Dutch Catholic missionary priest in Brazil from the Congregation of the Sacred Hearts of Jesus and Mary.

He was beatified in 2006 by Cardinal José Saraiva Martins on behalf of Pope Benedict XVI.

== Life ==
He was born Huub van Lieshout on 3 November 1890 in Aarle-Rixtel in the province of Brabant, the eighth of eleven children. His family was a very Catholic rural family. In 1903, he was enrolled in the Latin school in Gemert. After reading the biography of Damien de Veuster, van Lieshout transferred in 1905 to the minor seminary of the Picpus Fathers, becoming a member of the Congregation in 1913, at which time he received the religious name of Eustachius.

Upon completion of his theological studies in 1919, he was ordained a priest in August 1919. His first assignment was as assistant novice master for his order. He was then assigned to the towns of Maassluis and Roelofarendsveen in South Holland, where he provided pastoral care for the many Belgian refugees. In recognition of his work, the King of Belgium knighted him in the Order of Leopold. He then spent two years in Roelofarendsveen as a parochial vicar. In 1924 he was sent to Spain to learn Spanish, in anticipation of an assignment in Uruguay. However, he ended up being sent to Brazil, where the language was Portuguese.

=== Career in Brazil ===
Van Lieshout, along with two other Picpus priests and three lay brothers, was sent to Brazil, in response to an appeal for help by a local bishop. He arrived in Rio de Janeiro on 12 May 1925 and had to wait until 15 July when he was appointed pastor for the town of Agua Suja in Romaria. The inhabitants in parish of Agua Suja, where he served as a pastor, were occupied in searching gold along the shores of the river Bagagem. These people being deeply Catholics didn't meet the Catholic behavior in their common life. Van Lieshout saw his apostolic aim to change them and, with the course of time, he managed to do this because people in his parish gradually acquired the taste to the virtuous life.

In 1935 he was sent by his religious superiors to Poá. After news spread of van Lieshout's transfer, the population of the town started a bloodless uprising to stop him from leaving. Nevertheless, he left in obedience to his superiors for his new parish, where he worked to oppose the widespread practice of Candomblé. His blessings and cures of the sick through the intercession of St. Joseph made the little village a noted center of pilgrimage.

This, however, brought major problems to the town. Railroads were not able to furnish transportation for the great crowds; the lack of adequate housing meant that sanitary conditions were inadequate to the need. The police were no longer able to maintain order. Merchants sold bad food at high prices and thieves roamed the pilgrimage area preying on innocent victims. Van Lieshout was ordered to leave the parish to prevent these conditions from continuing. Despite this, tremendous crowds followed him everywhere. Brazilian authorities became so alarmed that they ordered him out of towns and villages. No one had anything against him, but they were afraid of the crowds and the commotion that would follow him.

The Cardinal Archbishop of Rio de Janeiro instructed van Lieshout to leave the capital by midnight. Subsequently, a fanatical crowd blocked traffic and invaded church rectories looking for him. He left Poá in May 1941.

Somehow, he managed to find a hiding place and passed a year in peace and happiness. His final appointment was as pastor of Belo Horizonte, where he lived the last two years of his life. He was given an assistant who was able to control the crowds. No one was permitted to enter the rectory without a letter of introduction. In this fashion, van Lieshout was able to devote his complete energy to the work of his parish. After a week of sickness caused by an insect bite, he died on 30 August 1943. He spent his last years in the precincts of Celeste Império around Jardim Montanhês, where he served his masses in chapel Cristo Rei. He travelled a lot all around the area and resumed his mission in the following words "health and peace" towards the faith and charity.

At his death, on his body was found a penitential pointed iron chain, buried so deep in his flesh that it could not be removed without tearing the flesh. Miracles are attributed to him. At first he was buried at the church of Santo Domingo, Belo Horizonte. But then he was reinterred at the church of the Sacred Hearts of Jesus and Mary, Belo Horizonte in 1949.

== Beatification ==
Eustáquio van Lieshout was venerated on 12 April 2003 by Pope John Paul II (decree of heroic virtues). Following a papal rescript of 19 December 2005, which declared authentic a miracle attributed to his intercession, van Lieshout was beatified in Belo Horizonte on 15 June 2006, the Feast of Corpus Christi that year, at a service led by the Archbishop of Belo Horizonte, Walmor de Oliveira de Azevedo. It was presided over by Cardinal José Saraiva Martins, Prefect of the Congregation for the Causes of Saints, acting on behalf of Pope Benedict XVI.

== Sources ==
- Eric Steinhauer (2001). "Lieshout, Eustáquio van". In Bautz, Traugott (ed.). Biographisch-Bibliographisches Kirchenlexikon (BBKL) (in German). Vol. 18. Herzberg: Bautz. cols. 835–836. ISBN 3-88309-086-7.
- Vatican Announcement of the Beatification of Father Eustáquio van Lieshout, SS.CC., June 14, 2006
