= Mariahout =

- Village
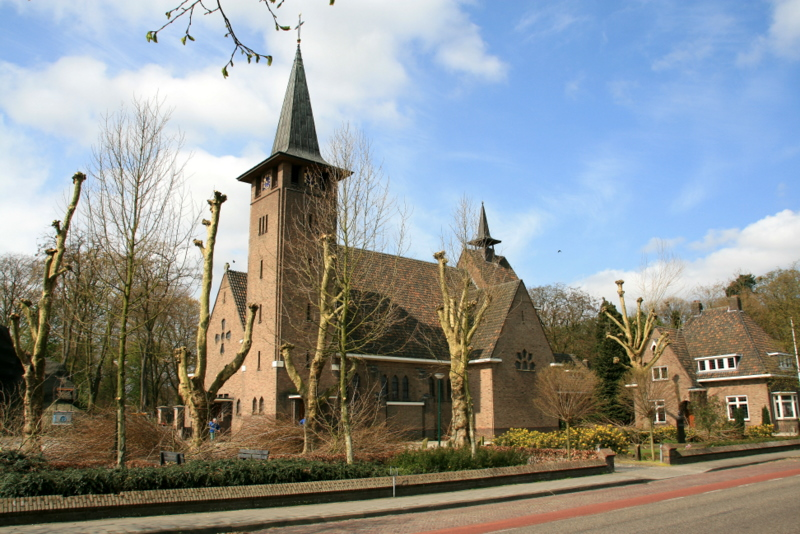
- The Our Lady of Lourdes Church in Mariahout

- Location in the province of North Brabant in the Netherlands Mariahout (Netherlands)
- Coordinates: 51°32′20″N 5°34′2″E
- Country: Netherlands
- Province: North Brabant
- Municipality: Laarbeek

Area
  - Total: 14.06 km^{2} (5.43 sq mi)
- Elevation: 14 m (46 ft)

Population (2021)
  - Total: 2,025
  - Density: 144.0/km^{2} (373.0/sq mi)
- Time zone: UTC+1 (CET)
  - Summer (DST): UTC+2 (CEST)
- Postal code: 5738
- Dialing code: 0499

Mariahout is a village located in the province of North Brabant in the south of the Netherlands, about 20 kilometers northeast of Eindhoven. Mariahout has a population of about 1700 and is the smallest village of the municipality of Laarbeek.

== History ==
From 1920 onwards, the heath land in the western part of the municipality of Lieshout was cultivated. Since then many new farmsteads were built that, together with an existing settlement, formed a new village community. This village was officially established in 1933 when it was given the name Mariahout. This name is a contraction of Maria, the patron saint of the new parish, and Lieshout. Until 1997 Mariahout was a part of the municipality of Lieshout. When this municipality was abolished on 1 January 1997, the village became part of the new municipality of Laarbeek.

== Born in Mariahout ==
- Guus Meeuwis, (born 23 March 1972), a Dutch singer and songwriter

== Gallery ==
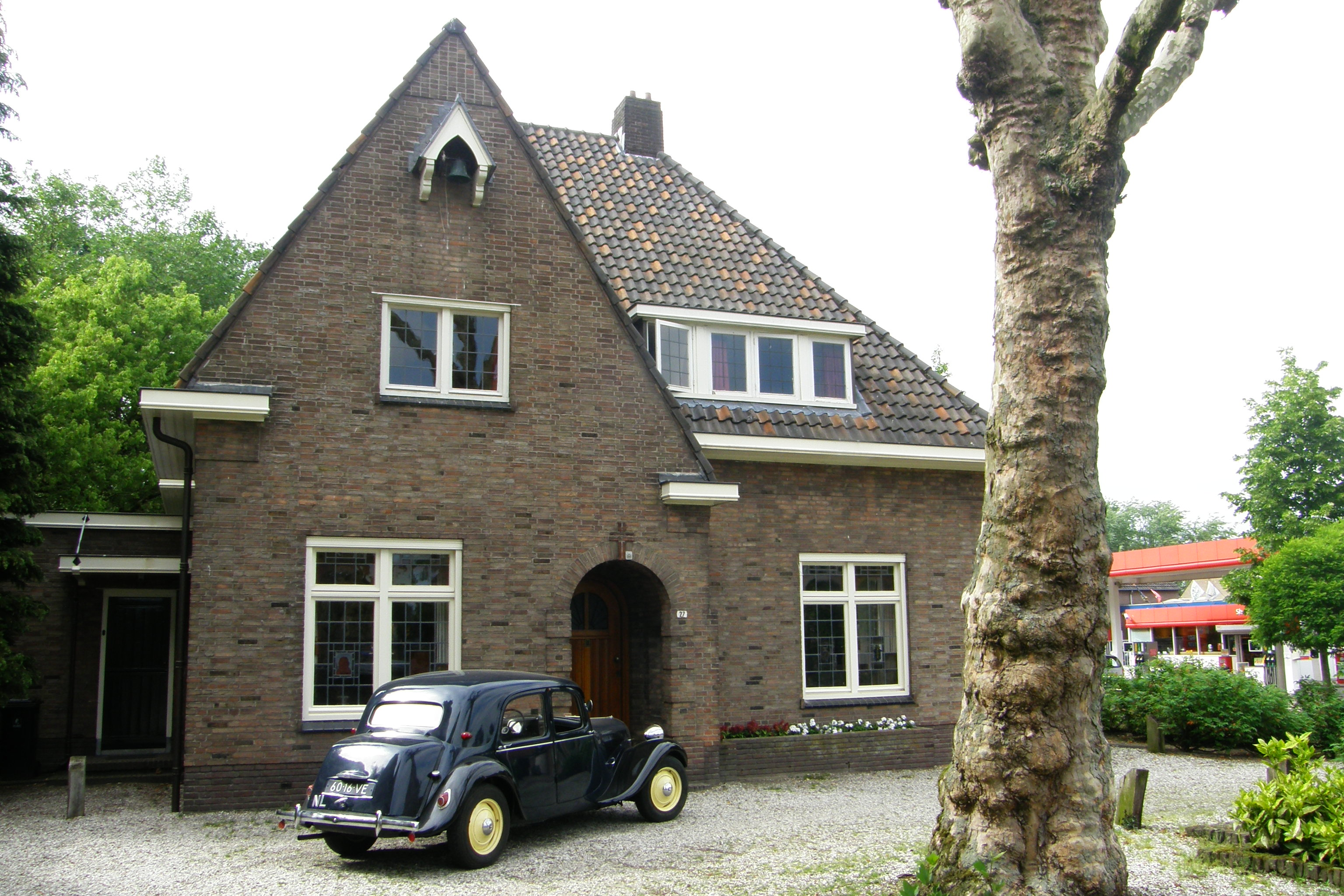
Clergy house

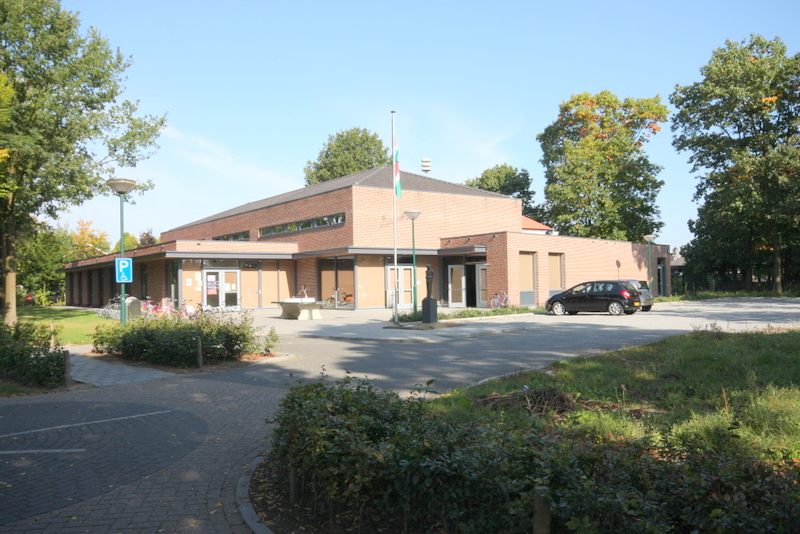
Community house

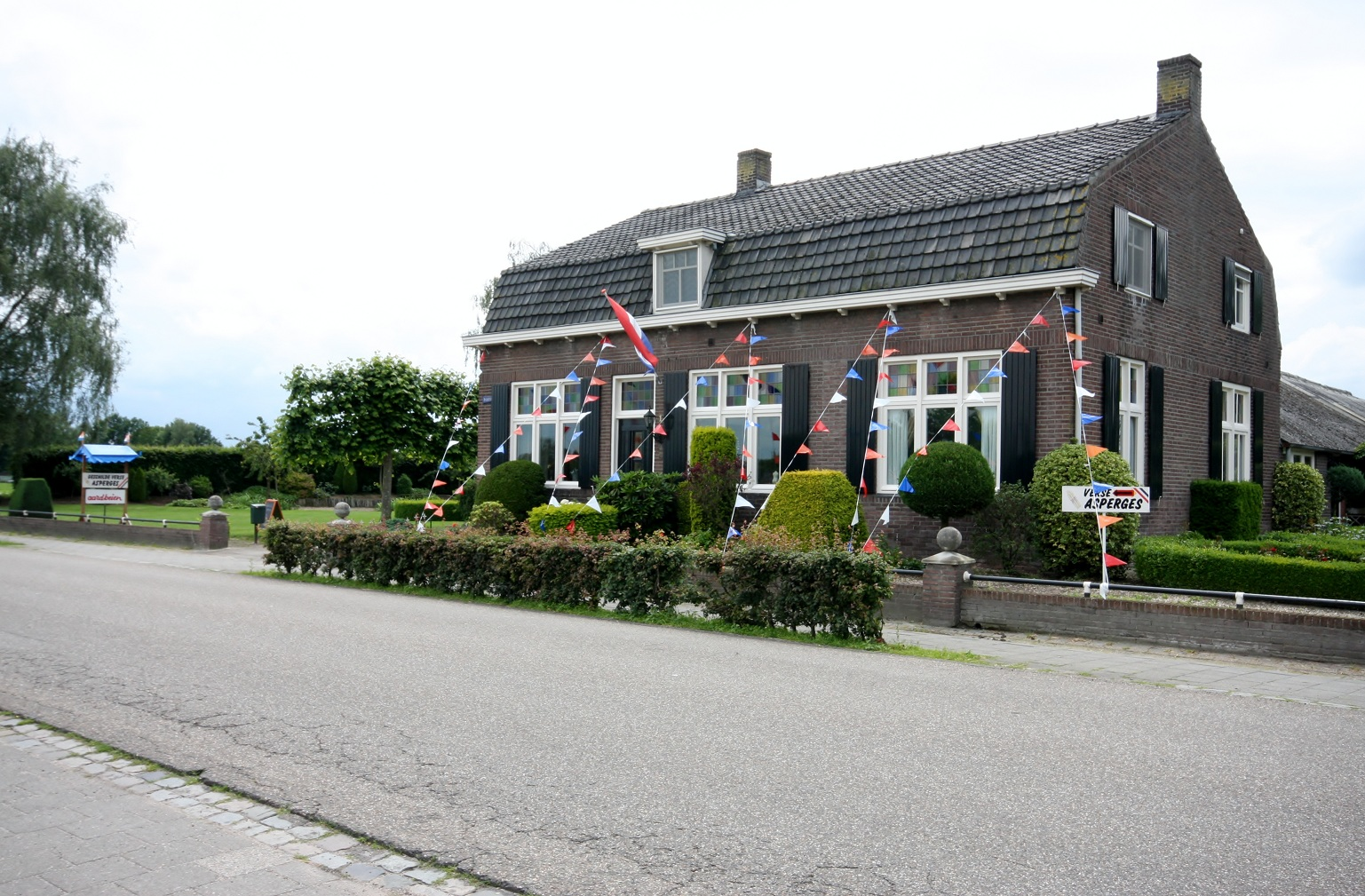
Farm in Mariahout
