= Lieshout =

- Village and former municipality
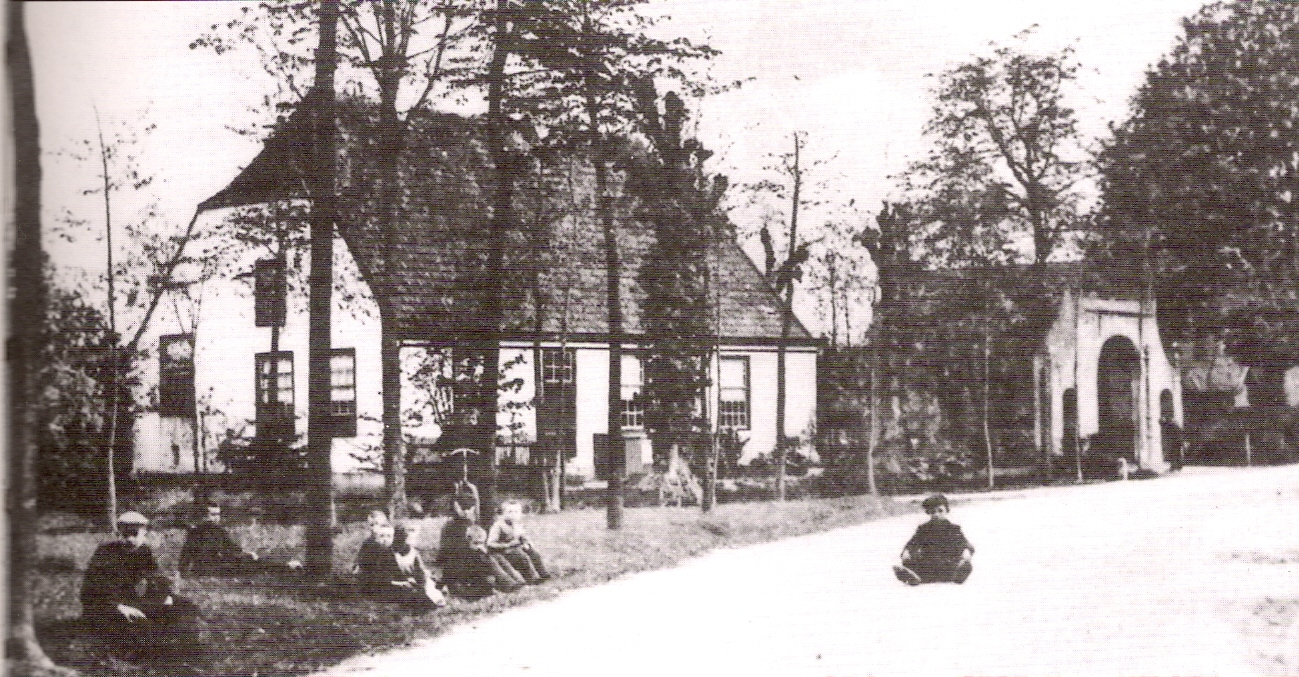
- A postcard from 1910 showing the Ribbius mansion and the "Gate to Binderen" in the center of Lieshout

- Flag Coat of arms

- Location in the province of North Brabant in the Netherlands Lieshout (Netherlands)
- Coordinates: 51°31′10″N 5°35′38″E
- Country: Netherlands
- Province: North Brabant
- Municipality: Laarbeek

Area
  - Total: 16.80 km^{2} (6.49 sq mi)
- Elevation: 14 m (46 ft)

Population (2021)
  - Total: 10,745
  - Density: 639.6/km^{2} (1,657/sq mi)
- Time zone: UTC+1 (CET)
  - Summer (DST): UTC+2 (CEST)
- Postal code: 5737
- Dialing code: 0499

Lieshout is a village located in the province of North Brabant in the south of the Netherlands, about 15 kilometres northeast of Eindhoven. There are 4,300 inhabitants, and the village is known for its brewing company Swinkels Family Brewers. The spoken language is Peellands (an East Brabantian dialect, which is very similar to Standard Dutch).

== Archeology ==
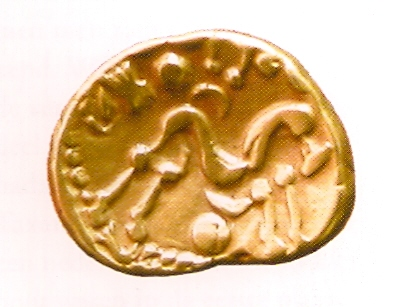
The gold Ambiani stater found in Lieshout in 1999

During archaeological excavations on Lieshout's territory several flint objects from the Stone Age were found, as well as features of agrarian settlements from the Bronze Age and the Iron Age. The excavations also revealed remains of Roman buildings and several wells, apparently belonging to a medium scale settlement. The peasant society comprised probably three to four farmhouses with outbuildings, where 30 to 40 people have been living. Moreover, also remains of a medieval settlement were found.

In total some 15,000 objects were unearthed, most of them from the period 1100 BC to 1100 AD. The finds indicate that the area was continuously inhabited from 1100 BC onwards. The objects include spearheads, fibulas and grave goods like small jars and colored plates and beakers, and a gold Ambiani stater, a coin minted around 50 BC.

== History ==
The present village was established in the 8th century as a Frankish allodium. At the end of the 12th century the lord of Lieshout donated the allodium to the Floreffe Abbey. In 1698 the abbey sold most of their property in Lieshout to the farmers.

The remaining land and buildings and the manorial rights were sold in 1714 to a noble family from Holland. This family sold the manorial rights in 1842 to a textile manufacturer from Helmond. With the revision of the Dutch Constitution in 1848 the feudal system was abolished in the Netherlands, whereby Lieshout lost its manorial status. In 1851 the "municipality of Lieshout" was established.

Improved accessibility of Lieshout at the end of the 19th century led to the rise and flourishing of industrial activities, including the Bavaria Brewery. In 1997 the independence of Lieshout came to an end when the village became part of the new municipality of Laarbeek.

== Places of interest ==
- "Gate to Binderen". A gateway from 1474 to the Binderen Abbey in Helmond. The gate was transferred to Lieshout around 1800. Here it gave access to a site surrounded by a moat, where the Ribbius mansion was located. In 1962 the mansion was demolished and replaced by a church devoted to Saint Servatius.
- "Manor house", also called "Hunting lodge" at Havenweg 10. This is the oldest building in Lieshout. The house was built between 1719 and 1725 by Jan Bout, at the time lord of Lieshout. Originally, the house was surrounded by a moat.
- Several farmhouses, including the official monuments "De Plashoeve" at Provincialeweg 10 and the farmhouse at Dorpsstraat 76.
- "De Vogelenzang (windmill)" at the Molendreef. This mill was built in 1819 to replace the late 18th century mill, which was blown down in 1817.
- "De Leest (windmill)" from 1899 at the Molenstraat. In front of the mill is the national monument "De Mulder" (The Miller), a bronze statue from 1989.

== Gallery ==
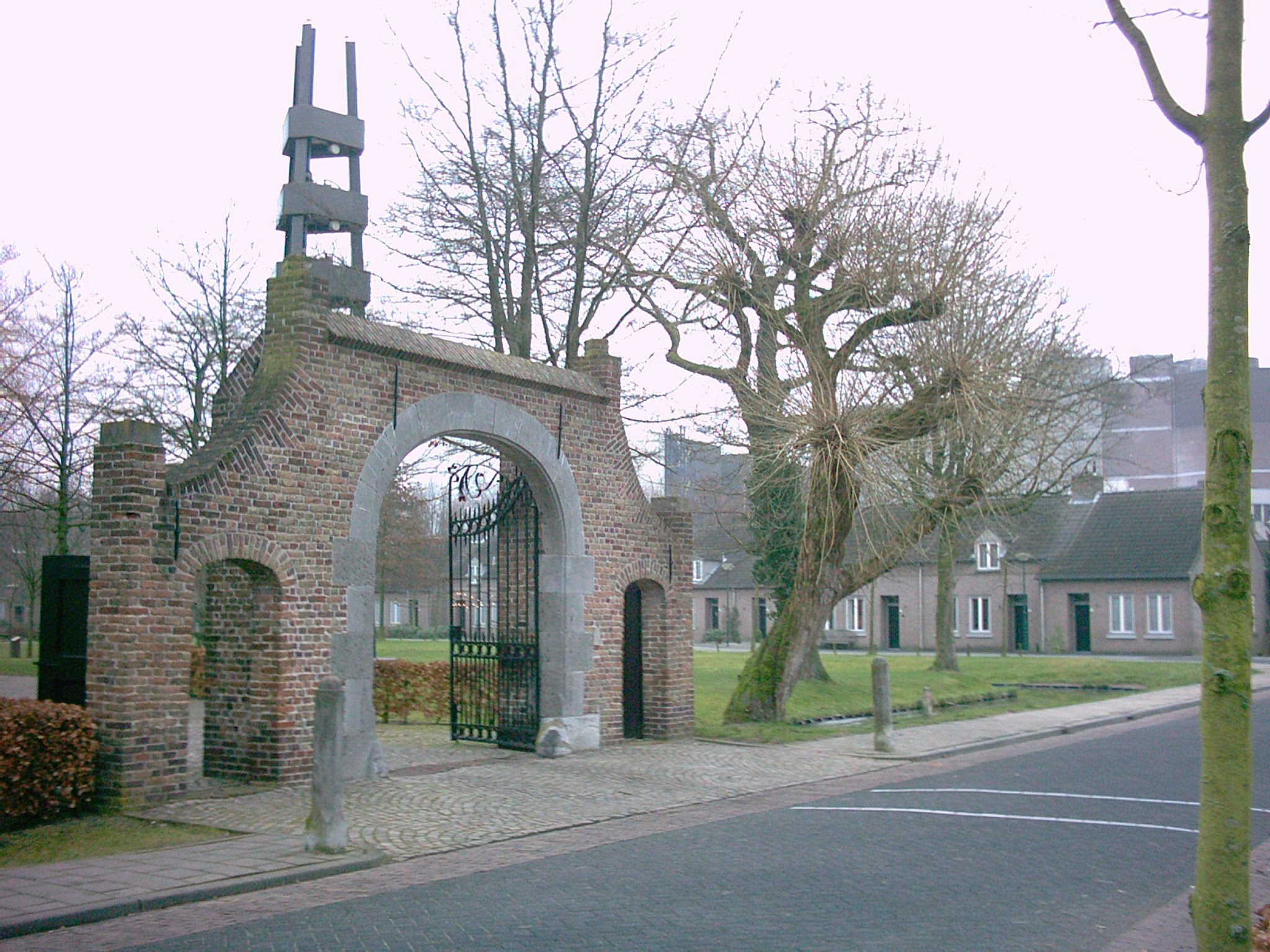
The Gate to Binderen from 1474 (rebuilt in 1800)

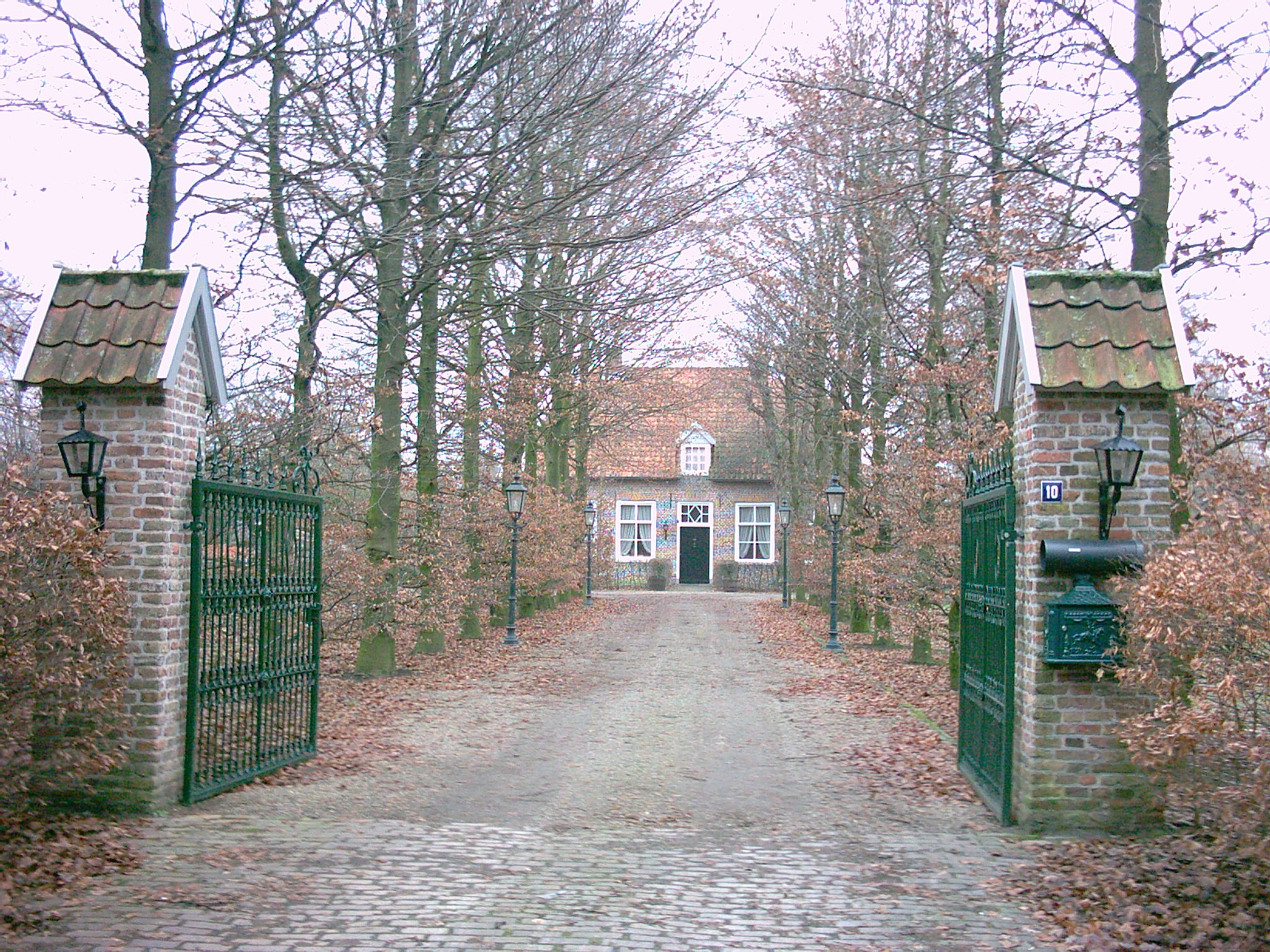
The Lord House from 1725

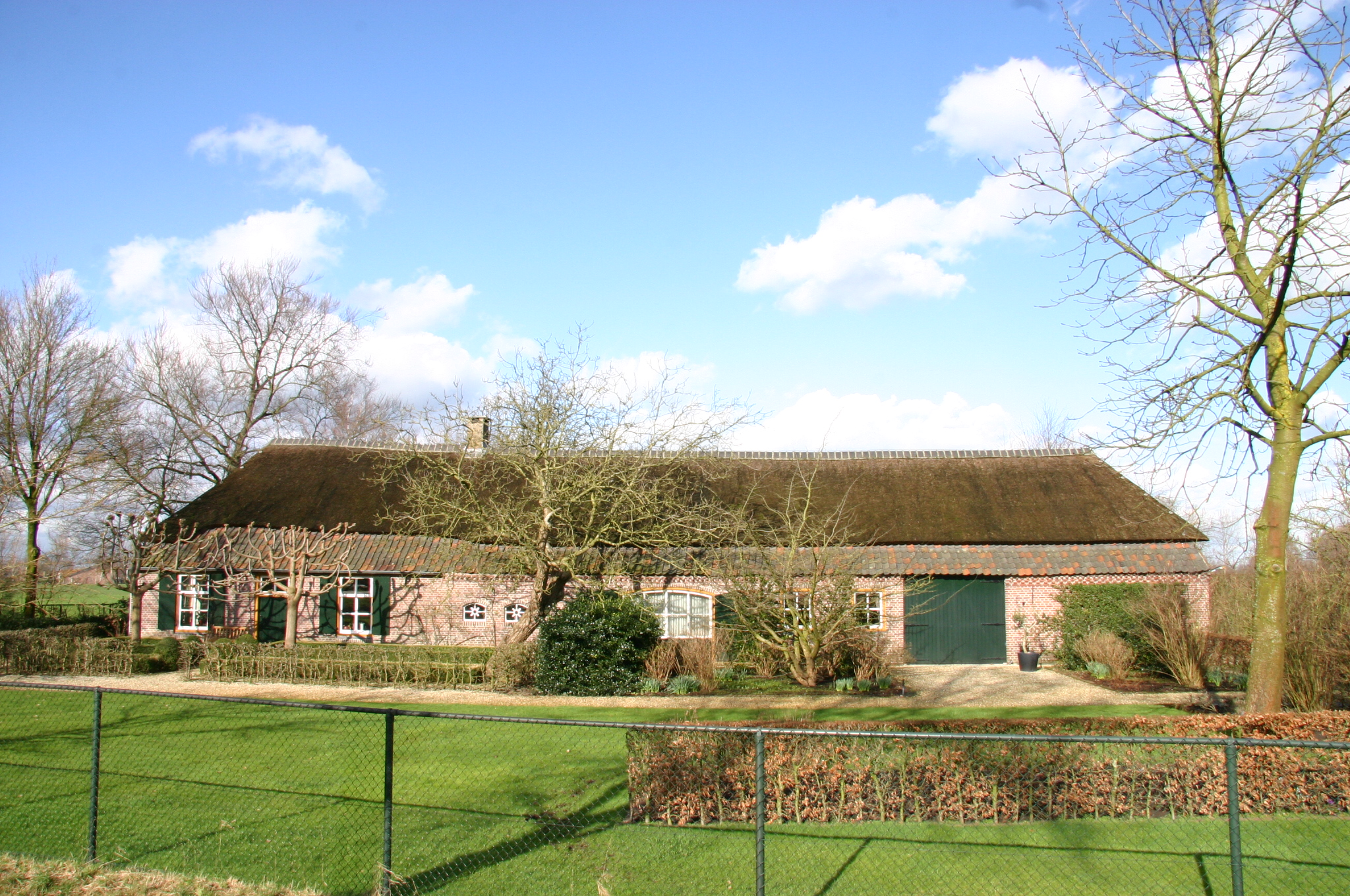
Farmhouse "De Plashoeve" from 1750

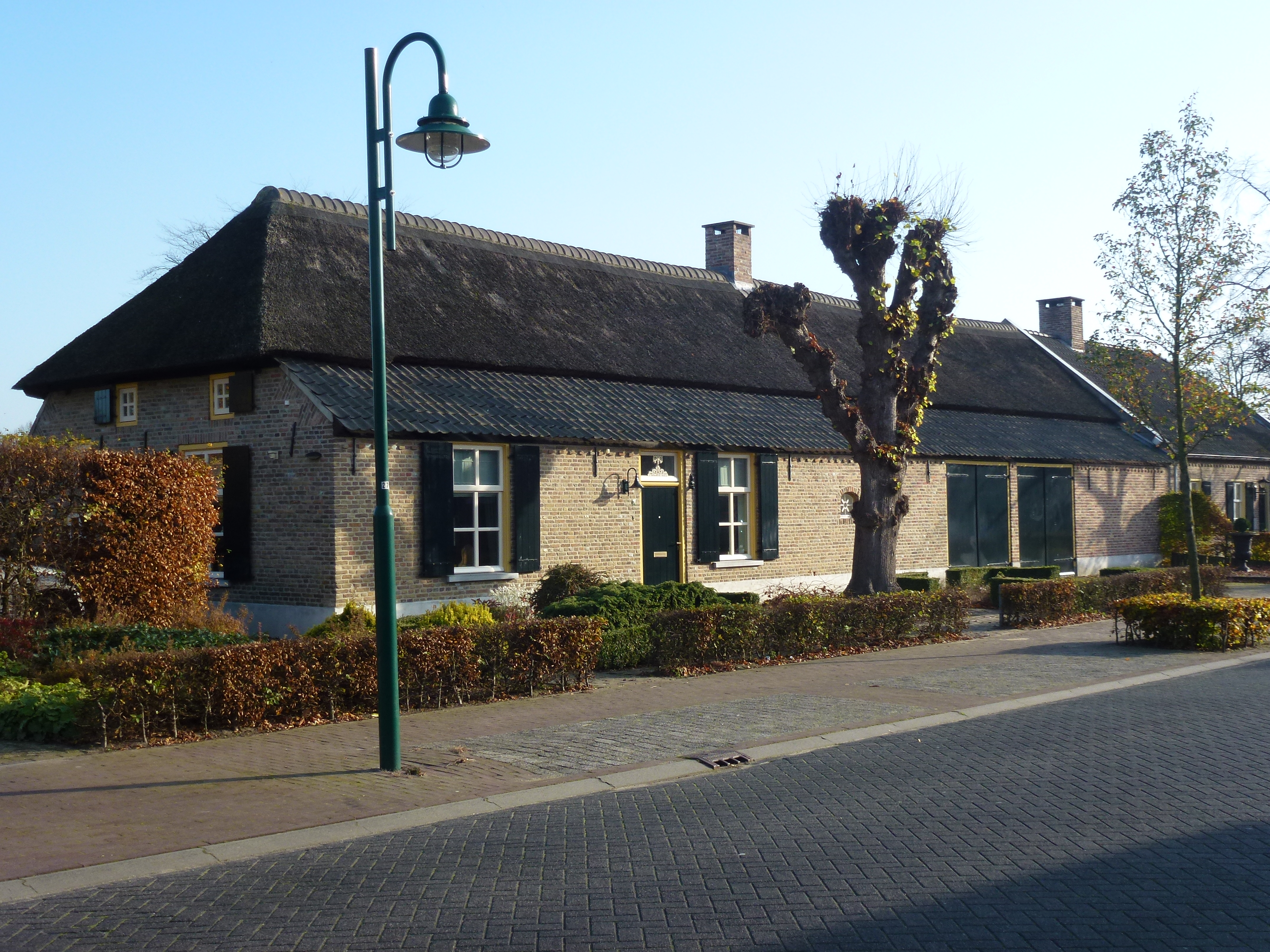
Farmhouse at Dorpsstraat 76, 18th century

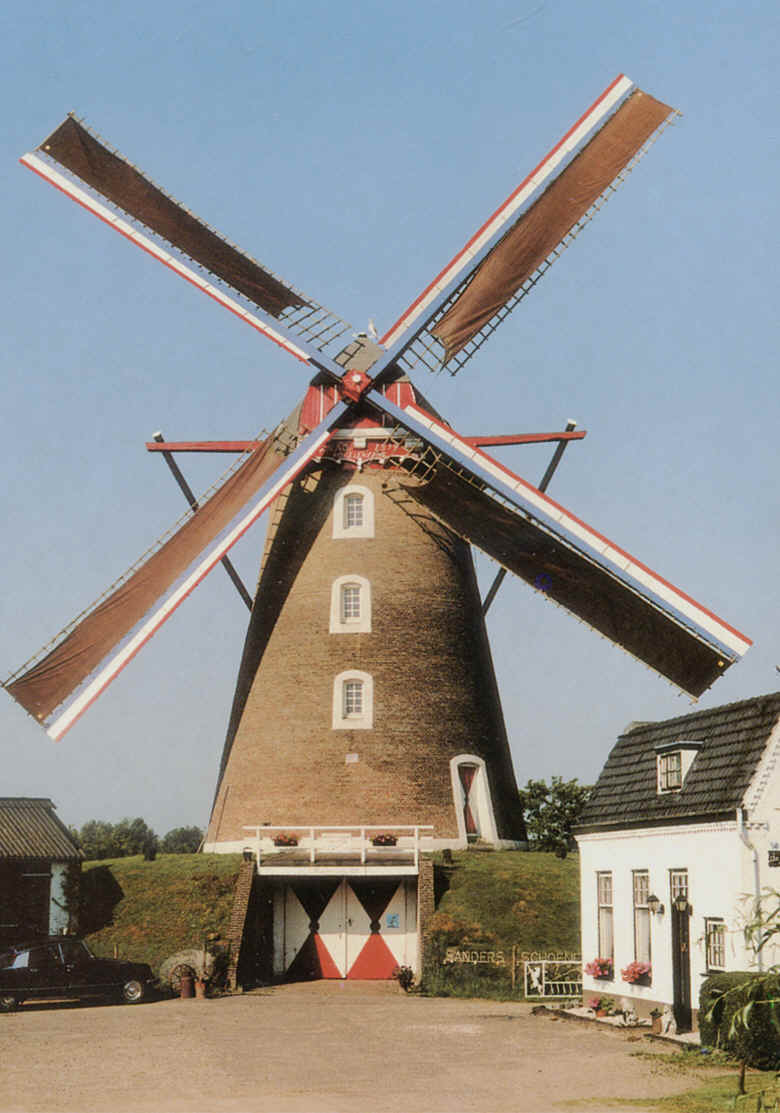
"De Vogelenzang (windmill)" from 1819

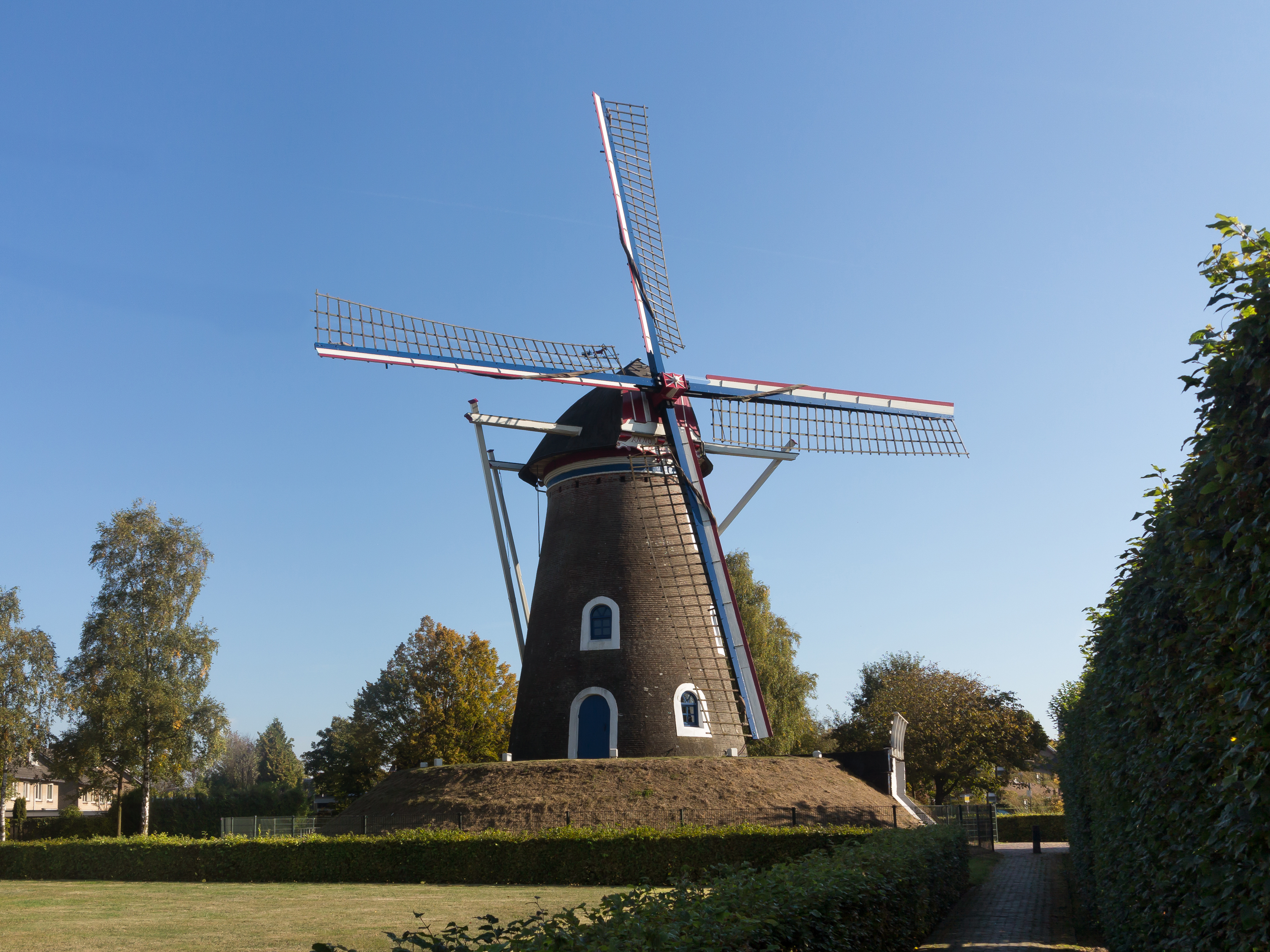
"De Leest (windmill)" from 1899

== Notable residents ==
- Guus Meeuwis (born Mariahout, 23 March 1972) is a Dutch singer and songwriter who grew up in Lieshout
- Johannes Franciscus Swinkels (1851-1950), modernized a local brewery that became Royal Swinkels.
