= Royal Swinkels =

Dutch brewing company

- Type: Public limited company
- Industry: Beverages, malt
- Founded: Before 1680
- Headquarters: Lieshout, North Brabant, Netherlands
- Area served: Worldwide
- Key people: Peer Swinkels, CEO; Mark Rutten, CFO
- Products: Beers, soft drinks, malt
- Revenue: ▲€ 1,118 million (2025)
- Net income: ▼€ 27 million (2025)
- Number of employees: 2,000 (2024)
- Website: Royal Swinkels

Royal Swinkels (formerly Swinkels Family Brewers and Bavaria Brewery) is a family business from North Brabant, Netherlands, that is active in the beer, soft drink and malt sector. The company is fully owned by the Swinkels family for seven generations. The head office is located in Lieshout, North Brabant.

Swinkels Family Brewers is the second largest brewery company in the Netherlands after Heineken and one of the largest producers of malt in Europe. The business has a turnover of more than 1,113 million euros per year. The company is commercially active in more than 130 countries. Two-thirds of the turnover is achieved in Europe. The focus is in Western Europe with more than half of the turnover. Outside of the European market, the largest contribution comes from the continents of Middle East/Africa, where a total of twenty percent of turnover is achieved.

== Products ==
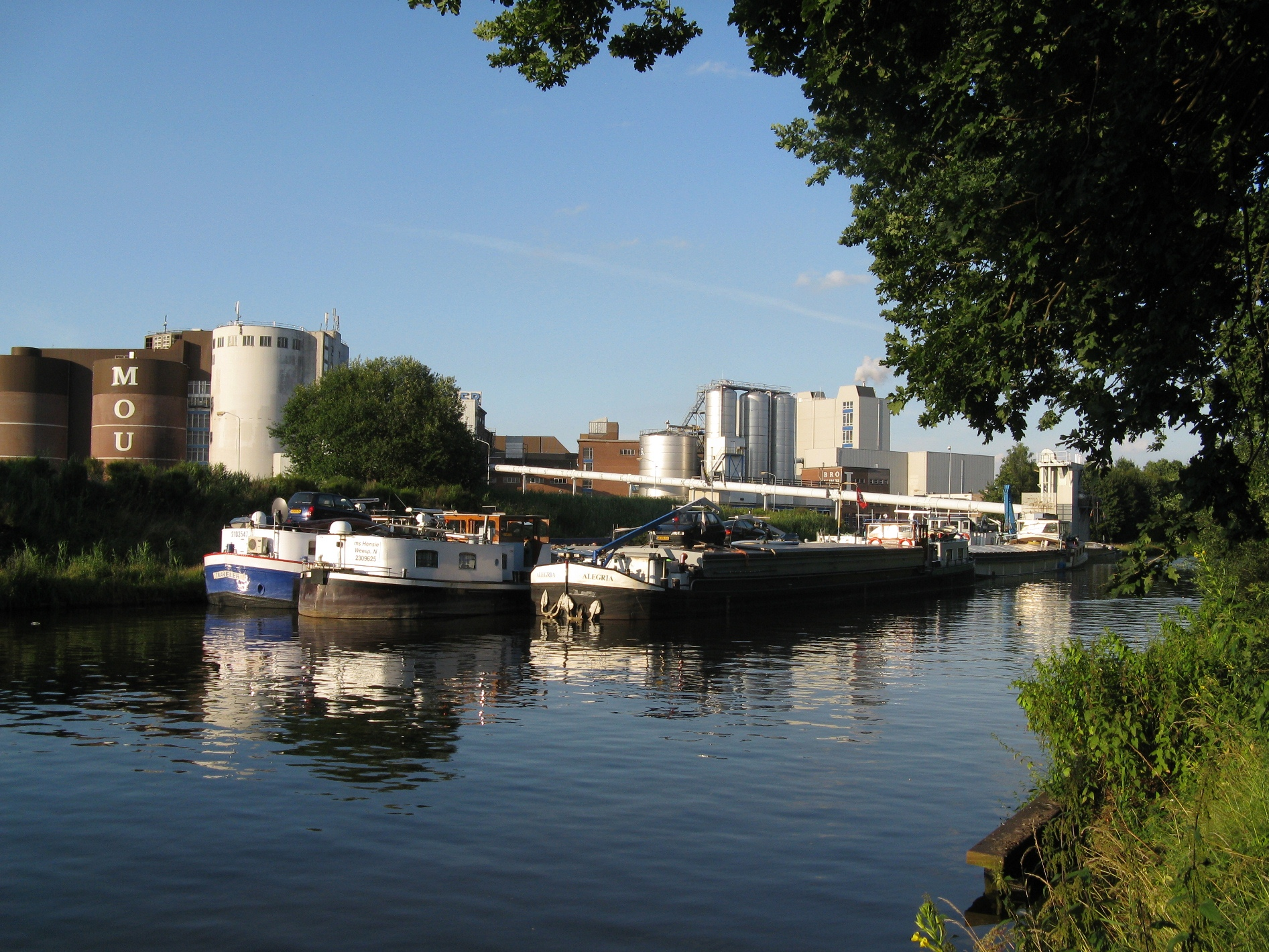
The Lieshout brewery of Royal Swinkels

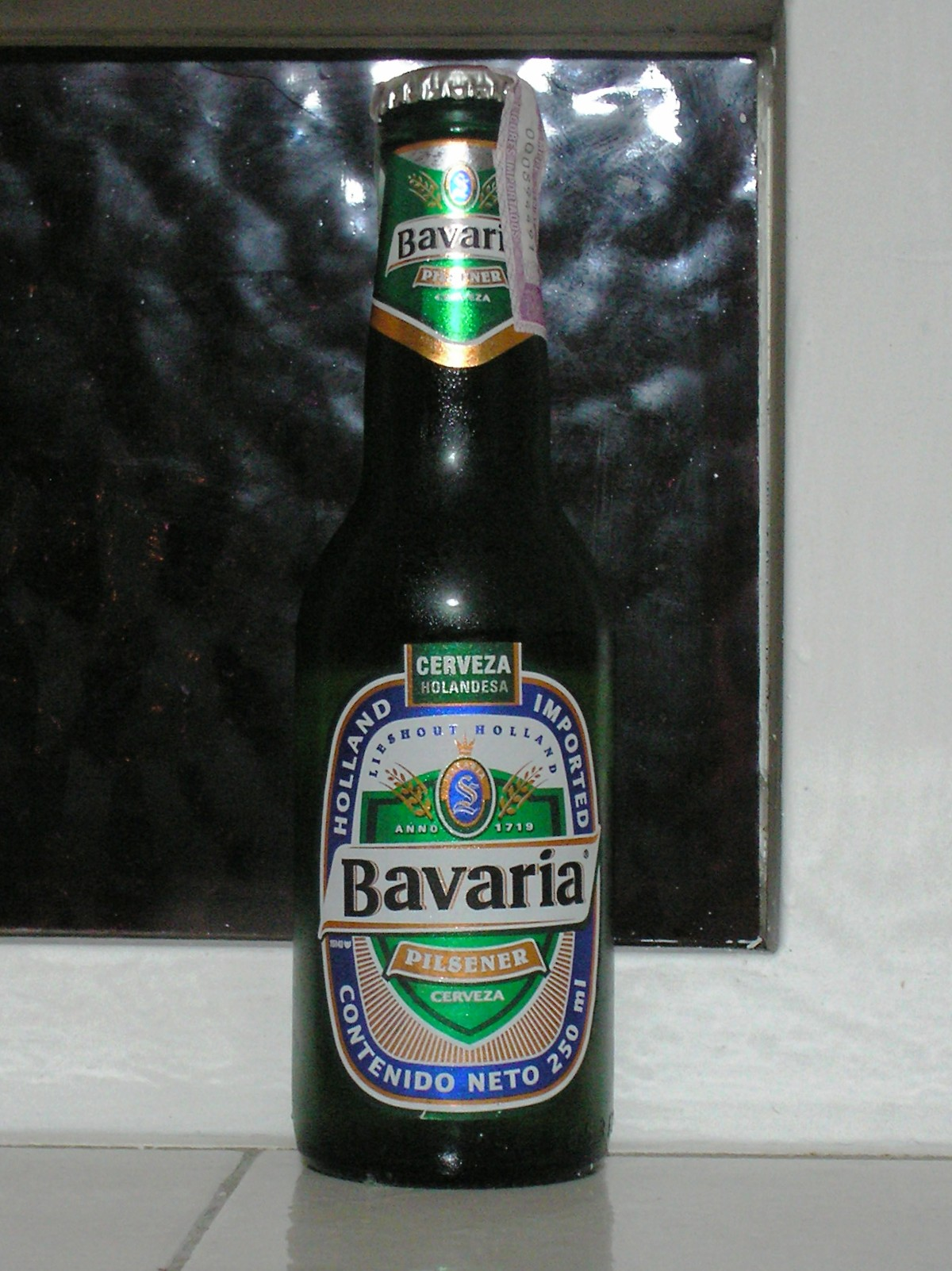
Bottle of Bavaria Premium Pils lager

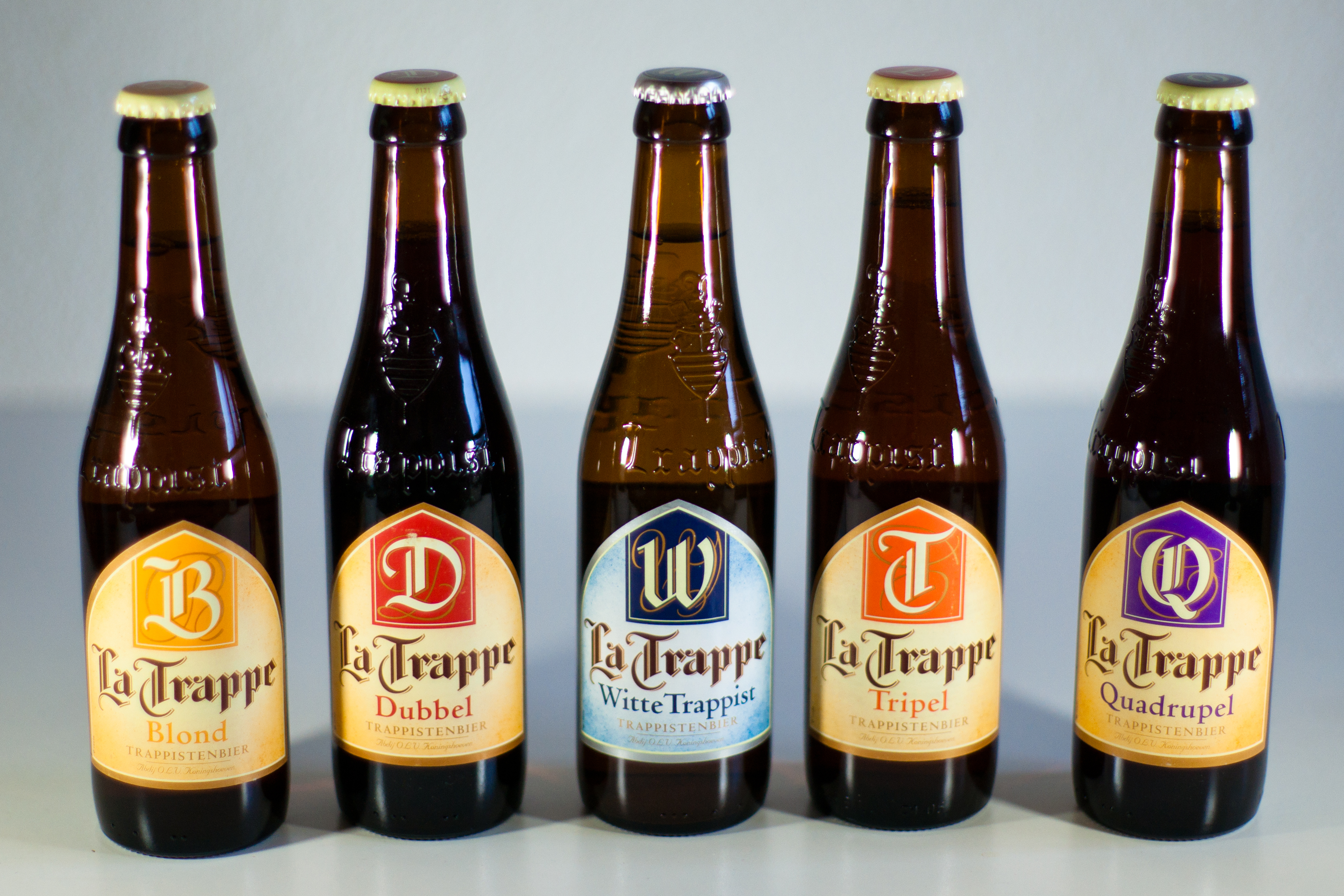
Five of the La Trappe beers: Blond, Dubbel, Witte Trapist, Tripel, Quadrupel

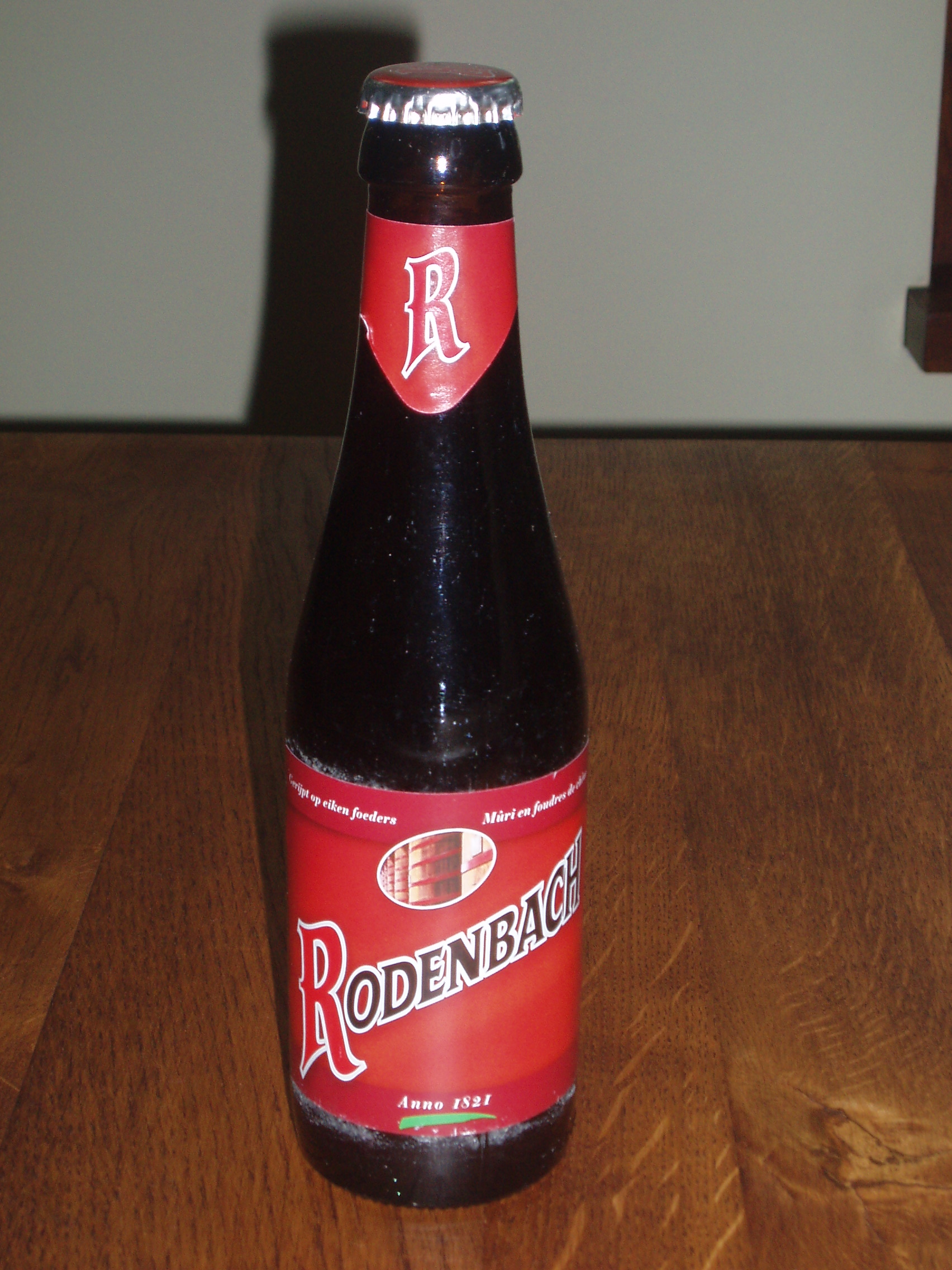
Bottle of Rodenbach beer

Royal Swinkels produces and markets beer, malt and soft drinks.

=== Beer ===
The business operates nine brewery locations: three in the Netherlands, three in Belgium, one in Ethiopia, one in Cuba and one in Georgia. These breweries produced nearly 7 million hectolitres of beer in 2024. The group sells beer under several brand names, including Bavaria, Swinckels', La Trappe and Rodenbach.

Almost 11 percent of the total beer production consists of alcohol-free and low-alcoholic beer (less than 3.5% ABV).

=== Malt ===
Swinkels Family Brewers owns two malt houses, one in Lieshout and one in Eemshaven. The annual capacity totals 400,000 tons of malt, a third of which is used by Swinkels Family Brewers itself. One third of the production is sold to third parties in Europe and one third goes to countries outside Europe, mainly to Latin America, South America and Japan. Sales of malt contribute to around fifteen percent of Swinkels Family Brewers sales.

=== Soft drinks ===
The company produces approximately 600,000 hectoliters of soft drinks per annum, of which almost 95 percent as private label products. Swinkels Family Brewers itself uses the brand names 3ES and B52. Negus, a non-alcoholic, coffee-flavoured malt drink is brewed in Ethiopia.

== History ==
=== Local brewery ===
The history of Swinkels Family Brewers can be traced back to 1680. In that year Dirk Vereijken owned a brewery at the Kerkdijk (Church Dike Road) in Lieshout, proof of which can be found in an account of the municipal tax records of that year. This brewery was transferred from father to daughter for three consecutive generations. The names of the new brewing families were Van Moorsel and Moorrees. In 1764 Brigitta Moorrees married Ambrosius Swinkels. After her mother's death in 1773, Brigitta and her husband became the full owners of the brewery. Since then, the brewery has been owned by the Swinkels family.

=== Regional brewery ===
For centuries the brewery only produced beer for the local market. It was not until the fourth generation of Swinkels took charge of the brewery that production was expanded. Jan Swinkels, born in 1851, started distribution to the city of Helmond at 10 kilometres (6.2 mi) from Lieshout in 1890. Sales rose from 988 hectolitres of beer in 1890 to 1,900 hectolitres in 1900. After the First World War distribution was expanded to other towns and villages in North Brabant. By 1923 output had increased to 3,325 hectolitres of beer. By that time the original brewery buildings had become too small so a larger brewery was built in Lieshout. On that occasion three brothers of the fifth generation of Swinkels took over leadership, and adopted the brand name Bavaria. This name indicated that the new plant was a bottom fermentation brewery, producing pale lager (Bavarian) beer.

=== Nationwide distribution ===
Distribution was broadened to include Amsterdam, Rotterdam, The Hague and Utrecht, the four largest cities of the Netherlands. In 1933 the brewery added its own bottling plant, which produced 2,000 bottles an hour. By 1940 a malt house was built. The output of the brewery at the beginning of the Second World War was approximately 40,000 hectoliters per annum, with an almost nationwide coverage in distribution.

In 1955 the company started manufacturing soft drinks under the brand name 3-ES. This name refers to the three Swinkels brothers of the fifth generation. In the postwar years beer consumption in the Netherlands had decreased to a very low level. It took the firm until 1959 to recover in terms of sales volume. In the sixties the company doubled its production capacity.

=== World player ===
From 1973 onwards the company took an interest in the exporting business, first of all in Southern Europe. In the late seventies the firm introduced alcohol-free beer, that was exported to Islamic countries. By 1981 the total volume reached 1,000,000 hectolitres of beer. From the nineties onwards the business expanded into exclusive and seasonal beers. Moreover, the company started to adapt its drinks to individual markets. Consequently, export grew to cover 130 countries.

In 1999, the Trappist Koningshoeven Abbey, located in Berkel-Enschot, entered into an agreement with the Swinkels family to take over the daily operations of the monks' brewery within the abbey. The brewery, which operates as "De Koningshoeven NV", is a subsidiary of Swinkels Family Brewers, whilst the buildings and equipment remain in the ownership of the abbey. The monks remain the ultimate authority on the brewing process while Swinkels Family Brewers manages the commercial business. The beer is sold under the brandname La Trappe.

On 10 May 2016 it was announced that the company has taken a majority stake in the Belgian brewery Palm. Initially the firm acquired 60% of the shares and this was expanded to 100% in 2021. In November 2016 the company acquired Latis Imports, establishing a dedicated US presence in one of its "five key regions".

In June 2018 it was decided to change the name of Bavaria to Swinkels Family Brewers. In March 2019, Wim van de Donk, Commissioner of the King of the province of North Brabant, announced that Swinkels Family Brewers would from now on have the Royal predicate, officially naming the company 'Royal Swinkels Family Brewers'. It has been gained for the 300th anniversary of the company and their national significance. As from 2024 the name was shortened to Royal Swinkels.

== Price fixing conviction ==
On 18 April 2007 the European Commission imposed punitive fines on three major European breweries for operating a price fixing cartel in the Netherlands. The three were Heineken (€219.3m), Grolsch (€31.65m) and Swinkels Family Brewers (€22.85m). A fourth participant in the cartel, InBev (formerly Interbrew), did not receive a penalty because it provided "decisive information" about the cartel's operations between 1996 and 1999, as well as about others in the European Union. These four brewers had control of 95% of the Dutch market, with Heineken claiming a half and the three others 15% each.

EU Competition Commissioner Neelie Kroes said she was "very disappointed" that the collusion took place at the very highest (boardroom) level. She stated, "This is simply unacceptable: that major beer suppliers colluded to up prices and to carve up markets among themselves. She added, "Heineken, Grolsch, Bavaria and InBev tried to cover their tracks by using code names and abbreviations for secret meetings to carve up the market for beer sold to supermarkets, hotels, restaurants and cafes. The price fixing extended to cheaper own-brand labels and rebates for bars.

== World Cup Ambush Marketing campaigns ==
At the 2006 FIFA World Cup, Swinkels Family Brewers got up to 1,000 fans of the Netherlands national football team to don orange overalls, called Leeuwenhosen, with the brewery's logo on them. The Leeuwenhosen were given away with the purchase of Swinkels Family Brewers products prior to the World Cup. However the action was deemed to be an act of ambush marketing by FIFA as Swinkels Family Brewers, which was not a corporate sponsor, had not paid any money to be an official event partner. With pre-warning from FIFA officials, staff at the game versus Ivory Coast asked fans to remove the overalls upon entrance to the game and provided orange replacement shorts without any logo.

During the 2010 FIFA World Cup, 36 women clad in orange miniskirts went to the Netherlands vs Denmark match in Johannesburg, using tickets supplied at least in part by British ITV pundit and ex-footballer Robbie Earle. Tournament officials evicted the group en masse from the stadium upon which they were arrested and held by the Police. They were released upon talks between the management of Swinkels Family Brewers and FIFA.

== Publication ==
- Antoon Swinkels & Peter Zwaal: Bavaria: a biography of the brewery in Lieshout and the family that owns it (Lieshout: Bavaria, 2008). ISBN 978-0-9731100-3-6
