= Johannes Franciscus Swinkels =

Dutch brewer

- Born: November 2, 1851; Lieshout, the Netherlands
- Died: July 28, 1950 (aged 98); Lieshout, the Netherlands
- Occupation: Modern Bavaria brewery cofounder
- Spouse: Cornelia Anna Verstappen
- Children: Jan Swinkels, Frans Swinkels, Piet Swinkels

J.F. (Johannes) Swinkels (1851–1950) was an important person of the Dutch brewing industry. He was the fourth generation of Swinkels family running a brewery in the Dutch village of Lieshout, North Brabant. When he took over the brewery in 1884 he started its transformation from a local brewery into a worldwide but still family owned company with annual production of five hundred million litres of beer. Nowadays Bavaria is the second largest brewery in the Netherlands and Johannes is considered to be the founding father of its present-day success. Johannes was actually the first brewer in Lieshout who fully focused on the brewing business only when his ancestors always split their professional capacities in between brewery and agriculture given the favourable location of Lieshout surroundings.

== Early life ==
J. F. Swinkels was born on November 2, 1851, in Lieshout, North Brabant. His mother was Petronella Donkers (1809–1897) and his father was Franciscus Swinkels (1798–1867), son of Brigitta Swinkels and Embertus Swinkels, and the third generation of Swinkels brewery family. Johannes (also called Jan in the family) had brothers Carel (1842–1897) and Janus (1855–1935). Both his brothers were keen on brewing industry as well when Carel founded his brewery Het Anker (Anchor) in Gemert, Netherlands, and Janus had a brewery De Zwaan.

== Brewing innovations ==
Johannes took over the brewery from his parents, Franciscus and Petronella Swinkels in 1884 and almost immediately expanded brewery's service to the industrial town of Helmond (10 kilometres (6.2 mi) from Lieshout) which resulted in big sales increase from 988 hectolitres of beer in 1890 to 1,900 hectolitres in 1900. He also set up future Bavaria catering portfolio via purchase of a café in Helmond in 1889. After 1907 he started with product range expansion to meet new consumer preferences. Due to sales increase as well as political situation Johannes started to search the world for new brewing methods and the ingredients of the highest quality. Purchases of ship loads of malt ensured the supply of raw materials and helped the brewery survive through World War I, when many small local Dutch breweries were forced to shut down. Another reason why he managed so well during World War I is fact that he temporarily used the malt plant as vegetable drying unit

After the First World War distribution was further expanded to other towns and villages in North Brabant. By 1923 output had increased to 3,325 hectolitres of beer per year and the original brewery buildings had become too small. Thus, in 1924 Johannes built a new brewhouse where the new bottom fermented beer was brewed. At that time rarely used "Brewing" enabled him to produce lighter "Pilsener type" beer with distinctive fresh taste. Hereby he found the worldwide expansion of the brewery and established worldwide known brand – Bavaria Brewery (Netherlands). Johannes has turned the business over to his sons Jan, Frans and Piet in 1925 but until his death in 1950 he still oversaw the operation of the family business.

== Personal life ==
In 1884 Johannes married Cornelia Anna Verstappen. Cornelia was a farmer's daughter and helped her husband with all administrative and financial matters. She was a brisk woman and it is believed that she had a quite influence on Johannes and definitely at least partly on her instigation Johannes expanded brewery's service to the industrial town of Helmond which resulted in a big sales increase.

The marriage with Cornelia gave to Johannes three sons – Frans (1896–1979), Piet (1899–1969) and Jan (1905–1999). All his sons continued with family brewery business which brought growth in sales of this family business and remained faithful to this brewery until their death.

Johannes was together with his wife active in Lieshout's community life to a grand old age.

== Sources ==
- Antoon, Swinkels; Peter, Zwaal; "Biografie van een brouwerij en een familie uit Lieshout"; 2008; Rotterdam; ISBN 978-90-73110-03-8
- Antoon Swinkels & Peter Zwaal: A biography of the brewery in Lieshout and the family that owns it. Lieshout, Bavaria, 2008. ISBN 978-0-9731100-3-6
