= Aarle-Rixtel =

- Village and former municipality
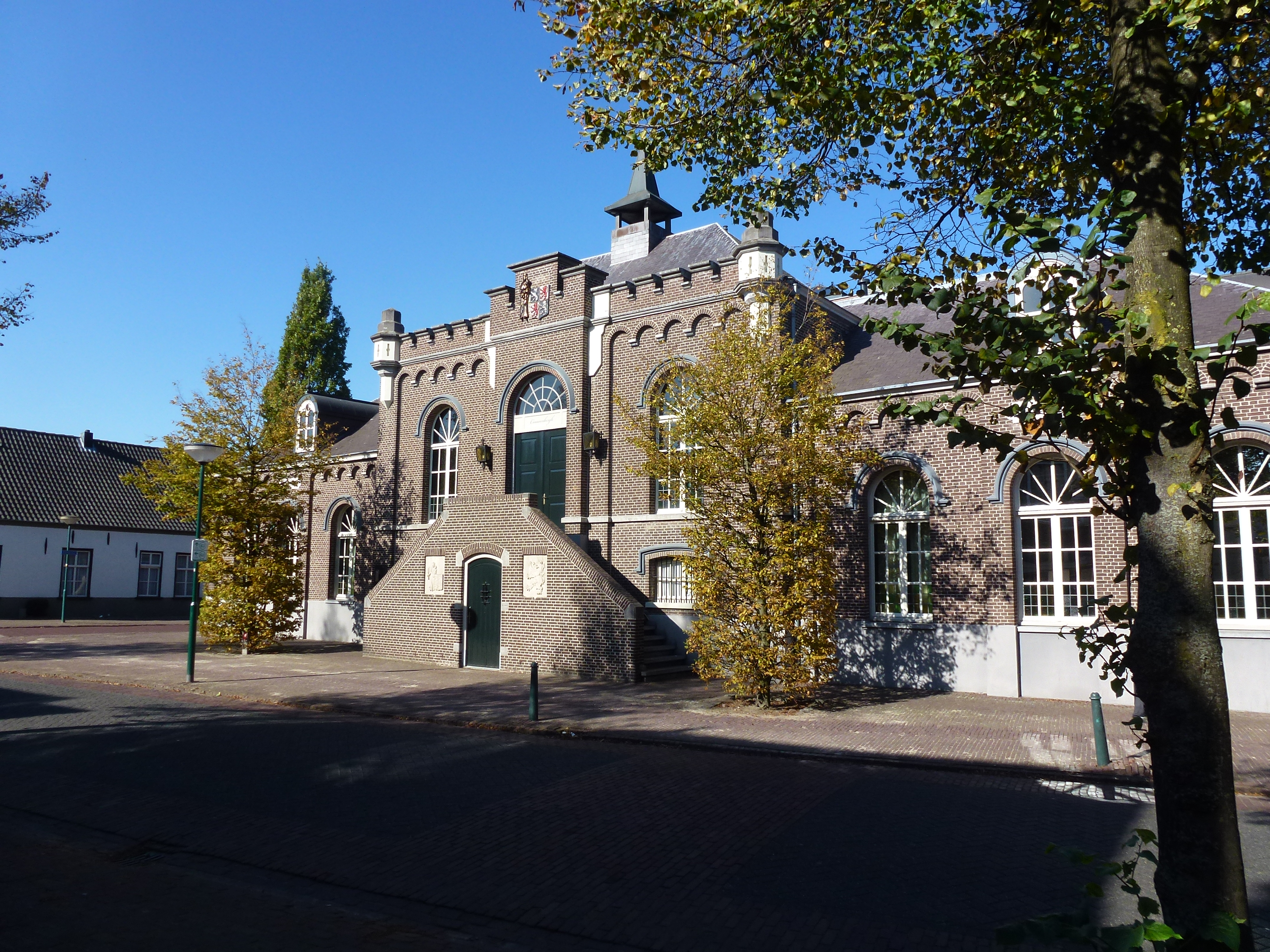
- Former town hall of the municipality Aarle-Rixtel

- Flag Coat of arms

- Location in the province of North Brabant in the Netherlands Aarle-Rixtel (Netherlands)
- Coordinates: 51°30′32″N 5°38′16″E
- Country: Netherlands
- Province: North Brabant
- Municipality: Laarbeek

Area
  - Total: 2.66 km^{2} (1.03 sq mi)
- Elevation: 17 m (56 ft)

Population (2021)
  - Total: 5,310
  - Density: 2,000/km^{2} (5,170/sq mi)
- Time zone: UTC+1 (CET)
  - Summer (DST): UTC+2 (CEST)
- Postal code: 5735
- Dialing code: 0492

Aarle-Rixtel is a village in the Dutch municipality of Laarbeek in North Brabant. It lies about 4 km north of Helmond. Since the municipal reorganization of 1968 the castle Croy is part of Aarle-Rixtel.

== History ==
Aarle was first mentioned in 1249 as Arleh, and means "open forest with maple trees". Rixtel was first mentioned in 1179 as Ricstelle. The etymology is unknown. The villages developed in the Middle Ages along the Aa River. The two villages merged into a single entity. Aarle used to be a site of pilgrimage, and had a church, guesthouse, monastery and an inn.

The Chapel of Our Lady in the Sand is a pilgrimage site which was built around 1500. It was rebuilt in 1597. In 1846, it was converted into town hall, but became a chapel again in 1853. In 1969, it was restored and made symmetrical again. There is a little 16th-century Mary statue inside in the chapel which allegedly has performed miracles.

The Our Lady Presentation Church was built between 1844 and 1846 in neoclassic style and is one of the finest examples of a so-called waterstaatskerk, churches built by the Rijkswaterstaat (Department of Public Works). It was remodelled between 1896 and 1897 by Joseph Cuypers.

Croy Castle was built in the 15th century as a summer residence. The gate with the two towers date from 1500 and were restored in 1790. The last residence was Constance van der Bruggen who left the estate to the poor of Stiphout. A retirement home was established in the castle until 1977. In 1988, it became an office building.

In 1840, Aarle was home to 701 people and Rixtel was home to 154 people. The former town hall was built in 1855 and consists of three blocks: a school, the town hall and the residence for the school teacher. Until the municipal reorganization of 1997, Aarle-Rixtel was a separate municipality. In 1997, it became part of Laarbeek.

The spoken language is Peellands (an East Brabantian dialect, which is very similar to Standard Dutch).

Since many decades, the village has been an important location for textile production. Petit & Fritsen was a bell foundry that was located in Aarle-Rixtel until 2014. In that year, the company was acquired by a competitor who became thereby the last remaining Dutch bell foundry.

== Gallery ==
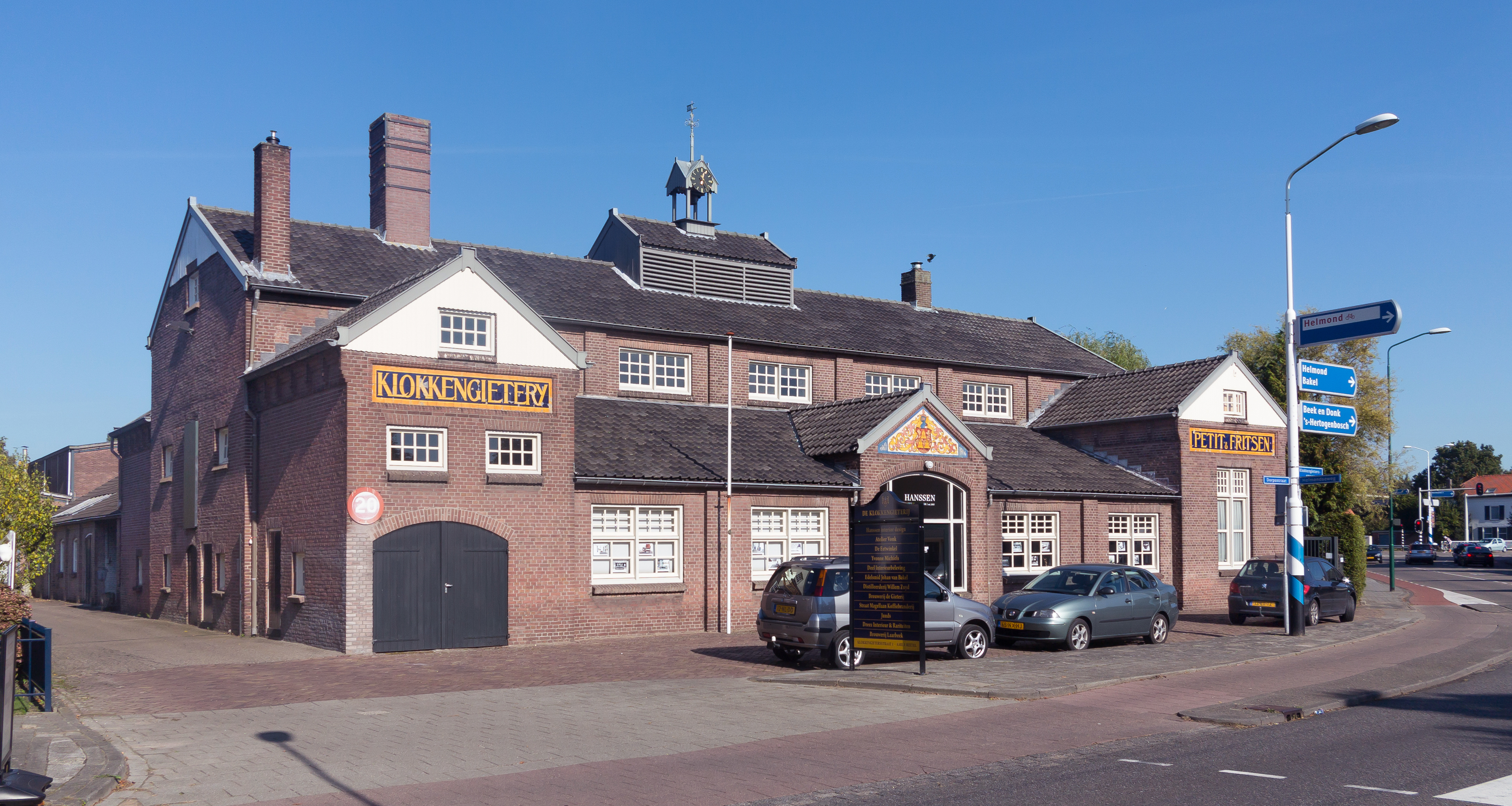
Bell foundry Petit & Fritsen

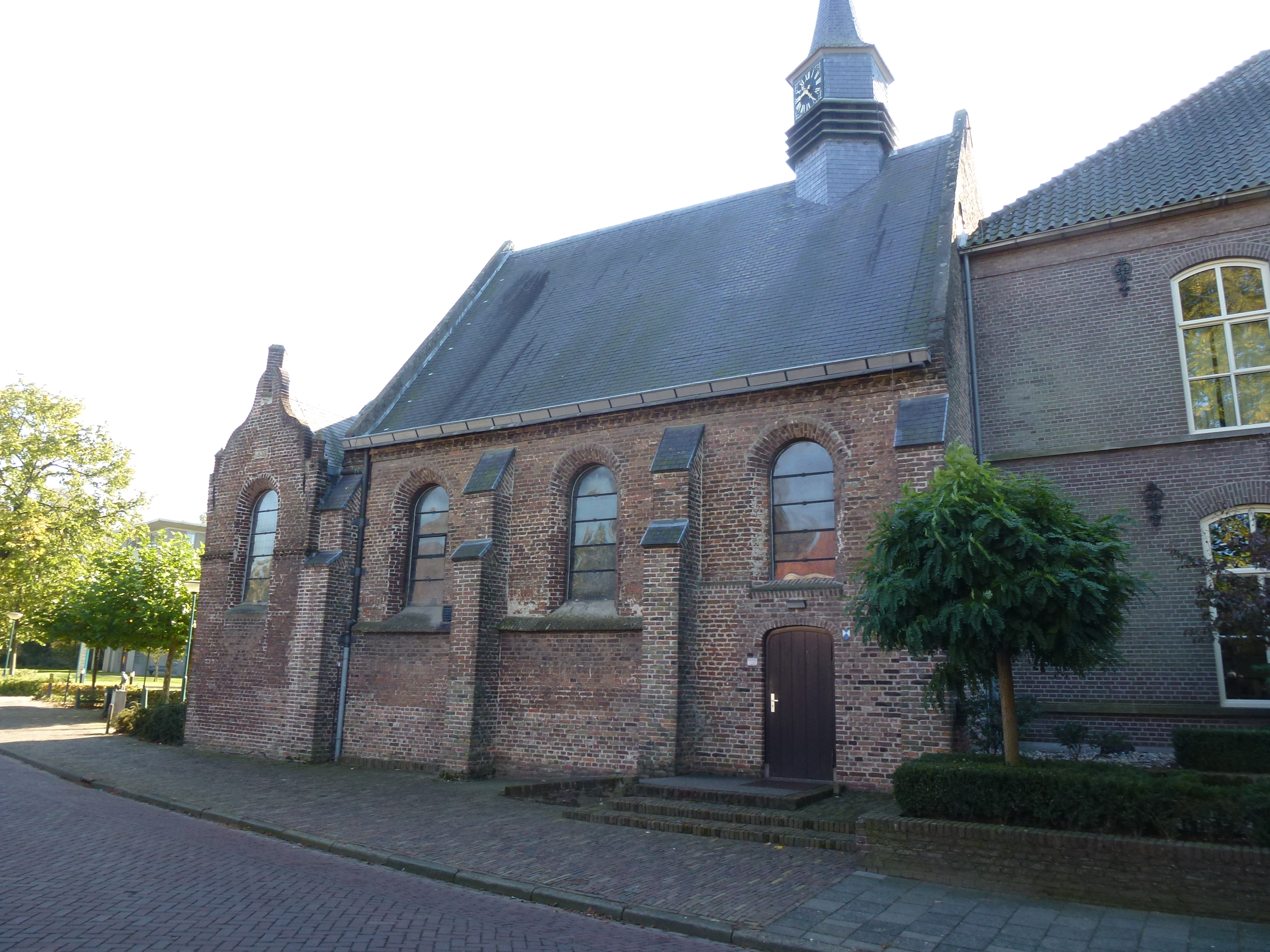
Chapel of Our Lady in the Sand

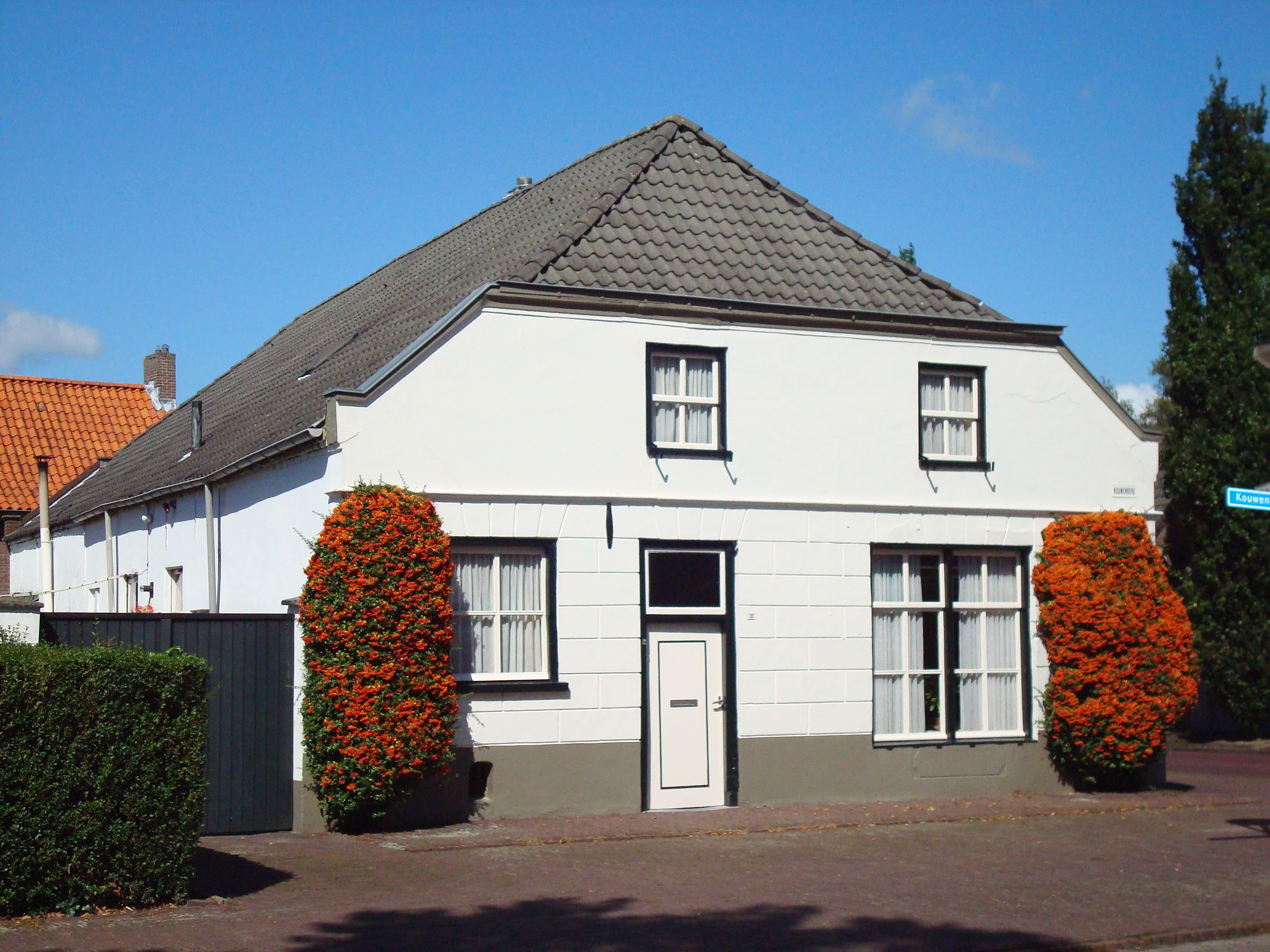
House in Aarle-Rixtel

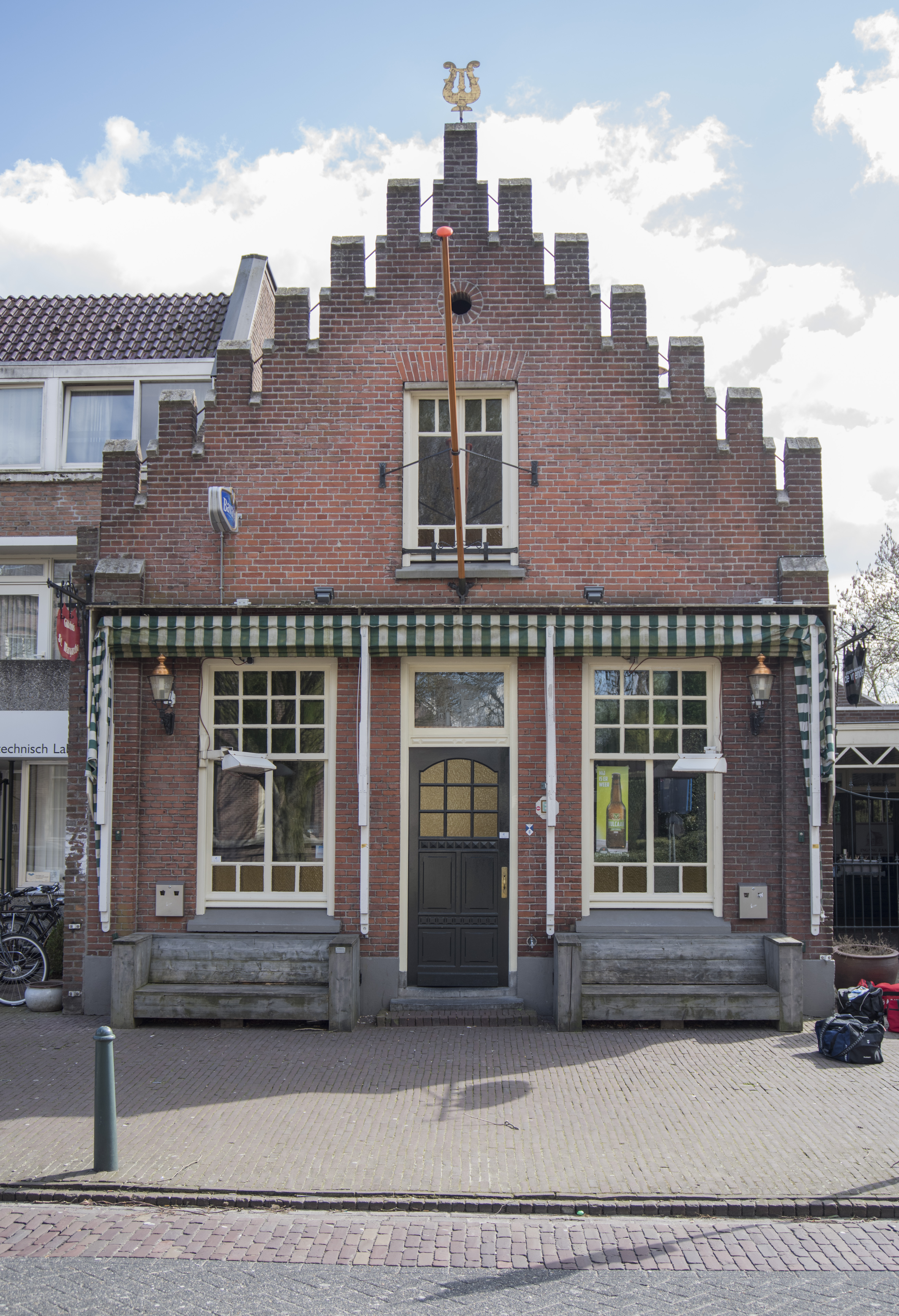
Pub in Aarle-Rixel
