= Sijbekarspel =

- Village
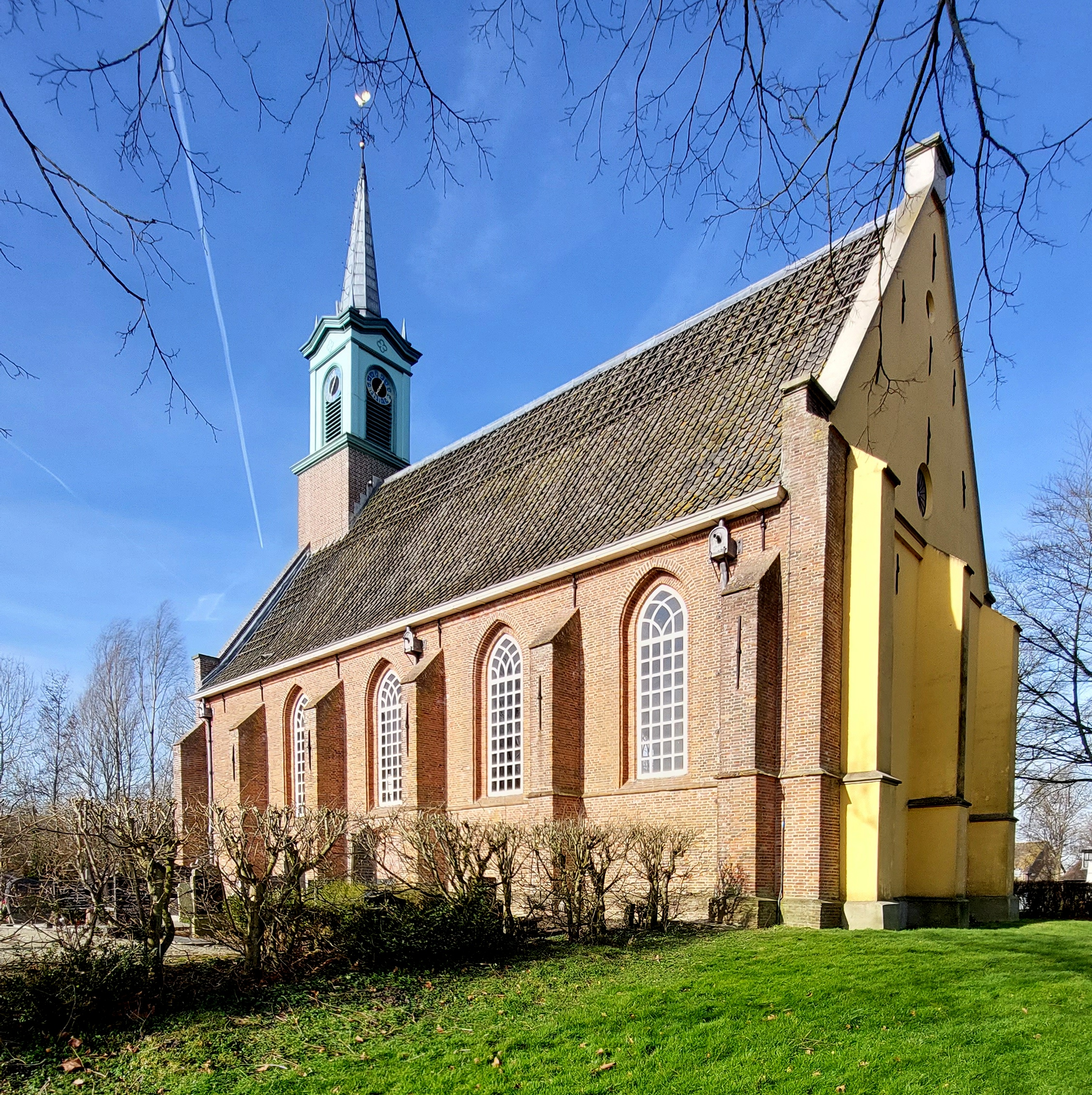
- Protestant church

- Flag Coat of arms

- Location in the Netherlands Location in the province of North Holland in the Netherlands
- Coordinates: 52°42′N 5°0′E
- Country: Netherlands
- Province: North Holland
- Municipality: Medemblik

Area
  - Village: 5.43 km^{2} (2.10 sq mi)
- Elevation: −0.6 m (−2.0 ft)

Population (2025)
  - Village: 925
  - Density: 170/km^{2} (441/sq mi)
  - Urban: 650
  - Rural: 270
- Time zone: UTC+1 (CET)
  - Summer (DST): UTC+2 (CEST)
- Postal code: 1655
- Dialing code: 0229

Sijbekarspel is a village in the Dutch province of North Holland. It is a part of the municipality of Medemblik, and lies about 10 km northwest of Hoorn.

Sijbekarsel consists of one long road, with a ribbon of buildings around it. On the east, it is connected to Benningbroek.

== History ==
The village was first mentioned around 1312 as Siboutskerspel, and means "parish of Sybout (person)." Sijbekarspel developed in the 11th century as a peat excavation settlement.

The Dutch Reformed church is a single aisled church with ridge turret. The nave dates from 1547. The wooden ridge turret was added in 1861 after the tower was demolished.

Sijbekarspel was home to 372 people in 1840. In 1887, a joint railway station with Benningbroek opened on the Hoorn to Medemblik railway line. The line closed in 1941.

It was a separate municipality until 1979. On 1 January 1979 it merged with the municipalities of Abbekerk, Midwoud, Opperdoes and Twisk and the village of Hauwert into the new municipality of Noorder-Koggenland. On 1 January 2007 Noorder-Koggenland merged with the municipalities of Medemblik and Wognum into Medemblik.

== Gallery ==
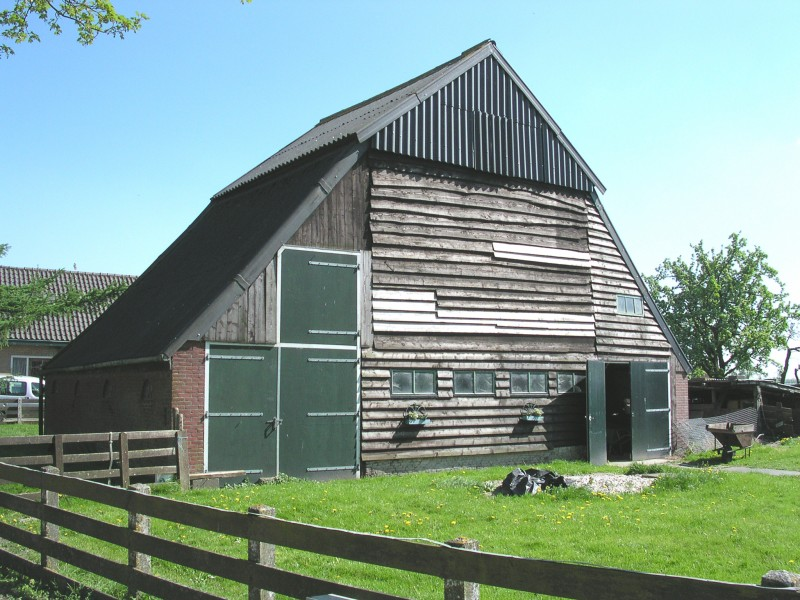
Farm in Sijbekarspel

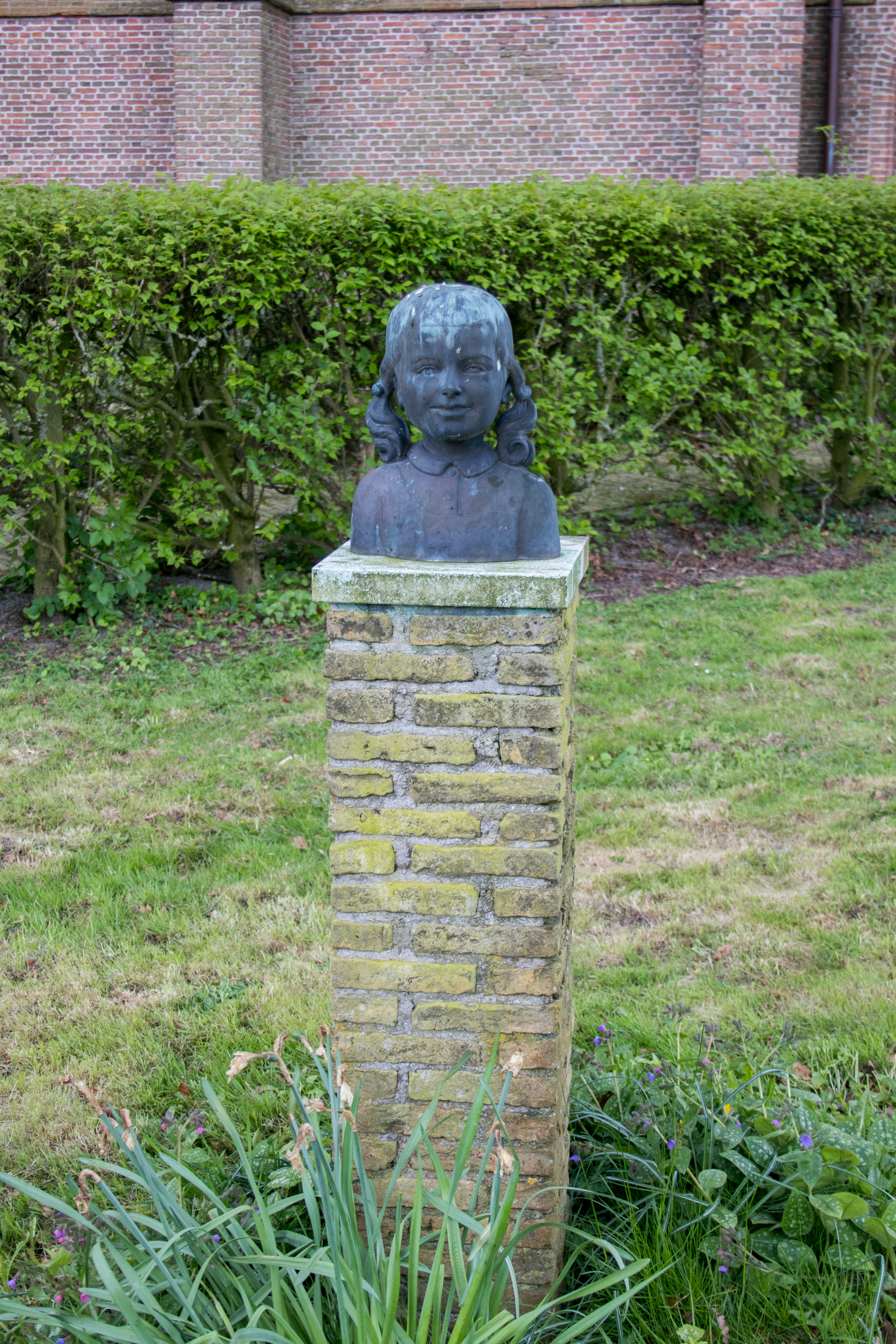
Bust in Sijbekarspel

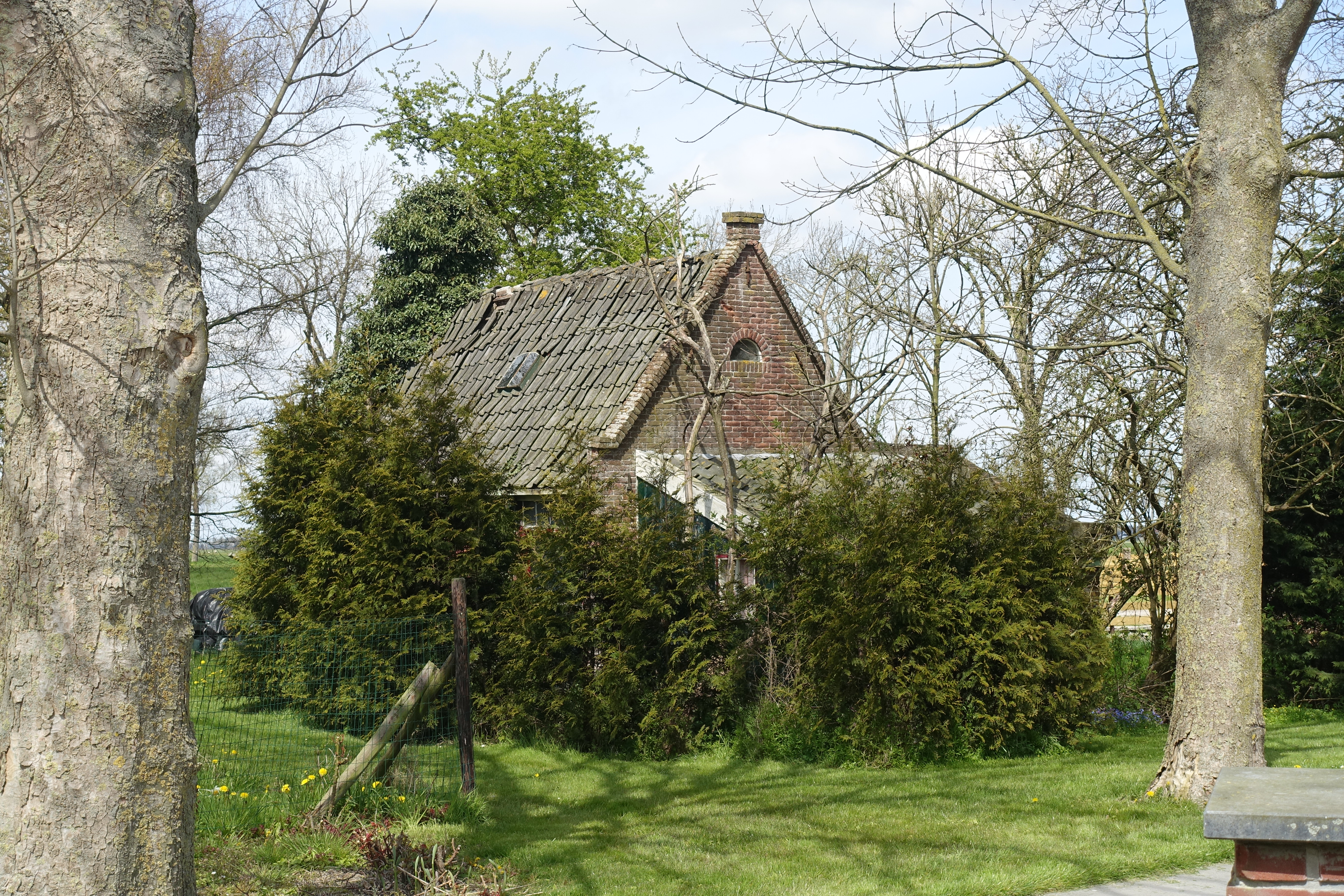
Little (derelict) farm worker's house
