= Noorder-Koggenland =

- Coat of arms

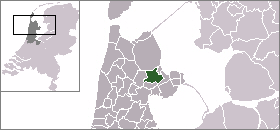
- Coordinates: 52°43′N 5°4′E
- Country: Kingdom of the Netherlands
- Constituent country: Netherlands
- Province: North Holland
- Municipality: Medemblik

Area
  - Total: 51.00 km^{2} (19.69 sq mi)
  - Land: 51.00 km^{2} (19.69 sq mi)

Population (2004)
  - Total: 10,501
  - Density: 206/km^{2} (530/sq mi)
- Time zone: UTC+1 (CET)
  - Summer (DST): UTC+2 (CEST)
- Website: www.noorder-koggenland.nl

Noorder-Koggenland (Dutch pronunciation: [ˌnoːrdər ˈkɔɣə(n)lɑnt]) is a former municipality in the Netherlands, in the province of North Holland. Abbekerk, located in the municipality of Noorder-Koggenland, received city rights in 1414.

The municipality merged into Medemblik in 2007.

== Population centres ==
The municipality of Noorder-Koggenland consisted of the following cities, towns, villages and/or districts: Abbekerk, Benningbroek, Hauwert, Lambertschaag, Midwoud, Oostwoud, Opperdoes, Sijbekarspel, Twisk.
