= Twisk =

- Village
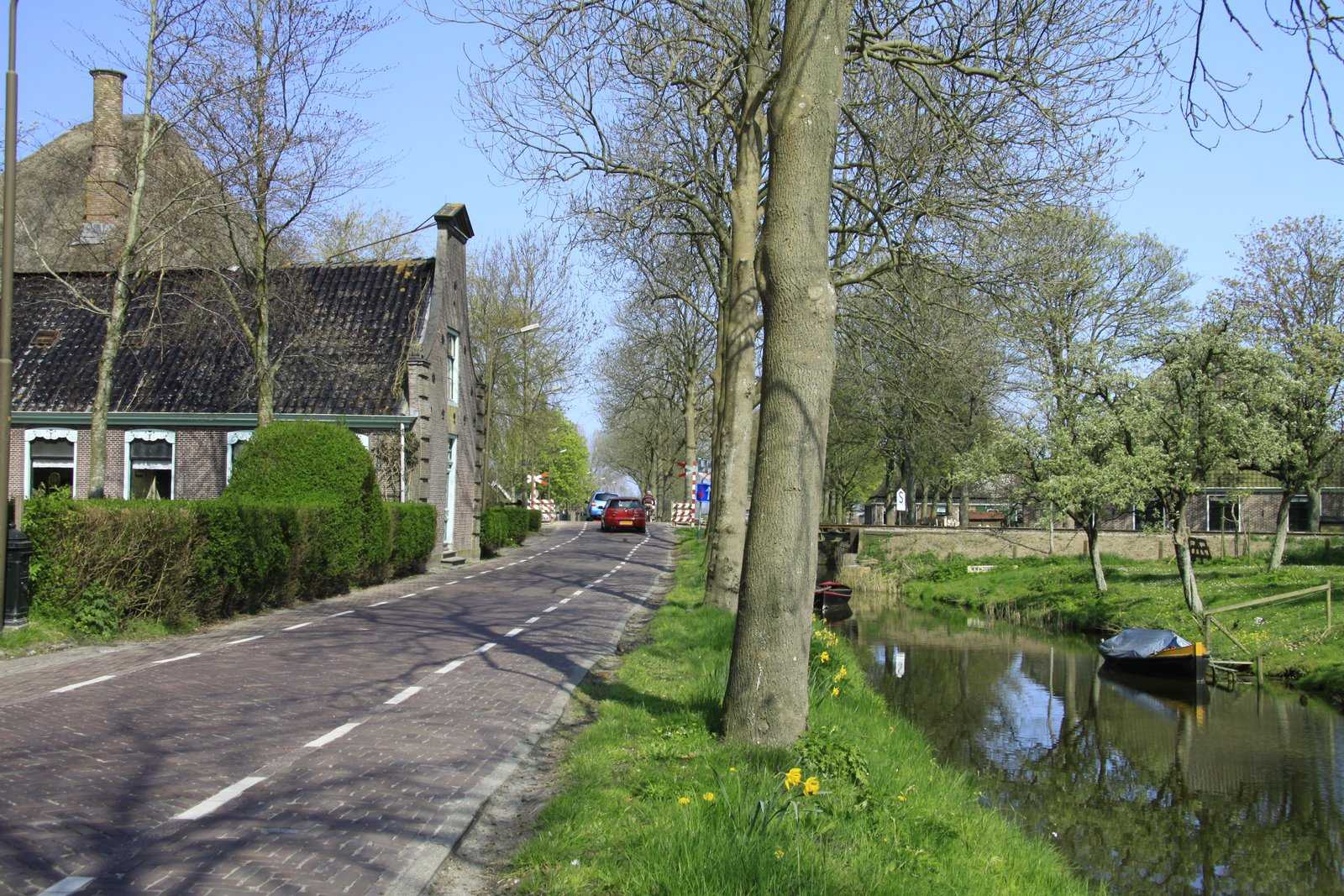
- Street view

- Location in the Netherlands Location in the province of North Holland in the Netherlands
- Coordinates: 52°44′N 5°3′E
- Country: Netherlands
- Province: North Holland
- Municipality: Medemblik

Area
  - Village: 7.67 km^{2} (2.96 sq mi)
- Elevation: 0.1 m (0.33 ft)

Population (2025)
  - Village: 1,060
  - Density: 138/km^{2} (358/sq mi)
  - Urban: 910
  - Rural: 150
- Time zone: UTC+1 (CET)
  - Summer (DST): UTC+2 (CEST)
- Postal code: 1676
- Dialing code: 0227

Twisk is a village in the Dutch province of North Holland. It is a part of the municipality of Medemblik, and lies about 10 km north of Hoorn.

== History ==
It was first mentioned between 1243 and 1245 as Twisc, and means "between/on the border". It may relate to the name of a stream. Twisk developed in the 11th century as a peat excavation settlement on the stream ridge from Abbekerk to Medemblik. The parcels of land are not a straight angle to the main road, therefore many houses and farms are built at an angle.

The Dutch Reformed church is a stretched single aisled church with a brick spire. The nave probably dates from the late 14th century. The church was elevated and enlarged in the early 16th century. The plaster of the tower was removed during the restoration of 1976 to 1981. The church is no longer in service and was sold in 2017.

Twisk was home to 647 people in 1840. In 1887, a railway station was built on the Medemblik to Hoorn railway line. The line closed in 1941.

Twisk was a separate municipality until 1979, when the new municipality of Noorder-Koggenland was created. In 2007, it became part of the municipality of Medemblik.

== Gallery ==
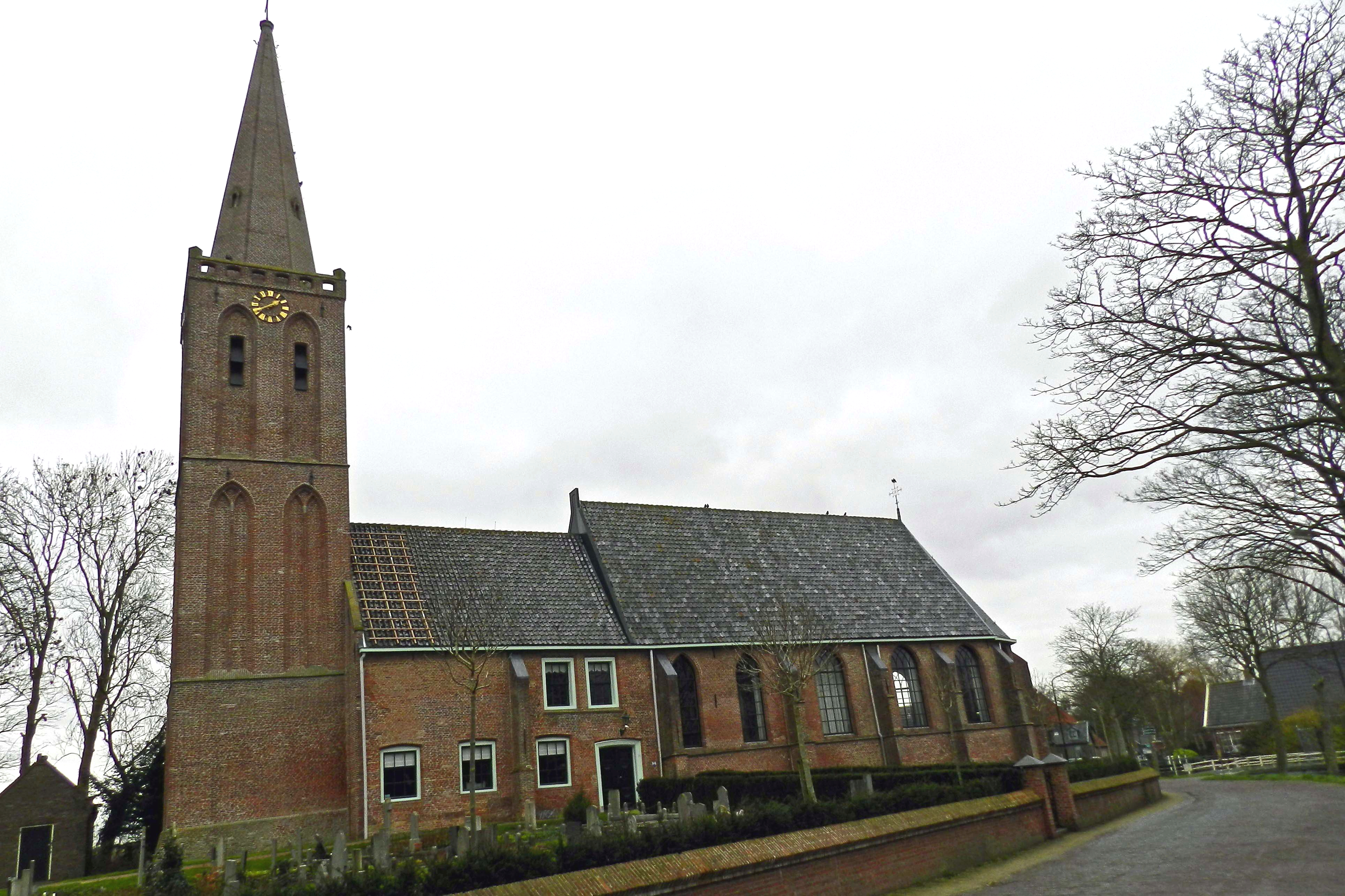
Dutch Reformed church

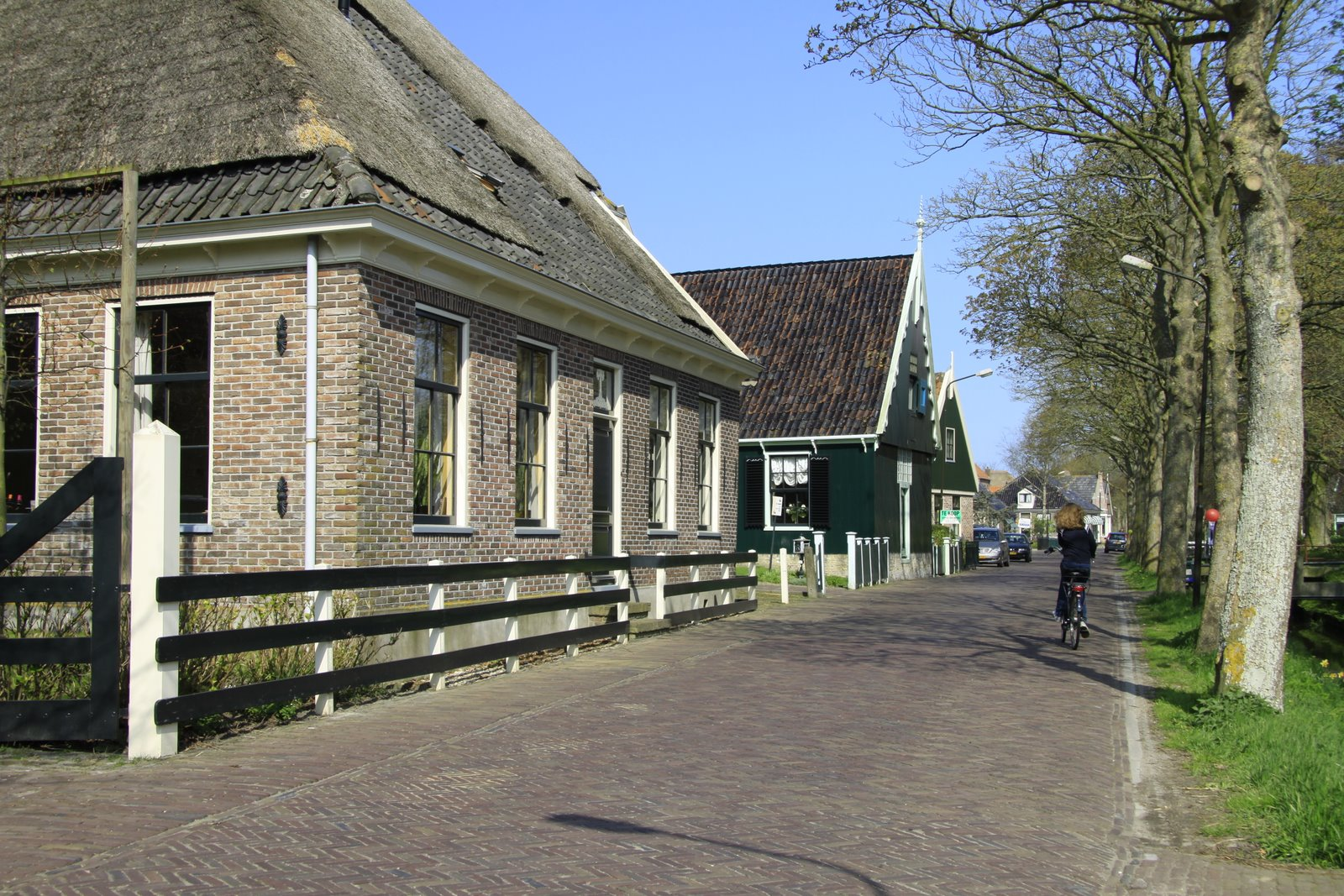
Street view

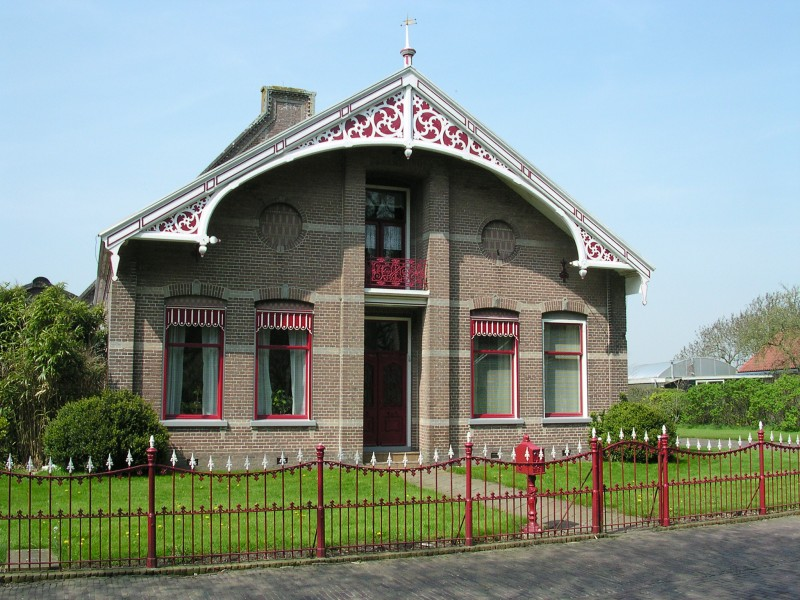
Farm in Twisk

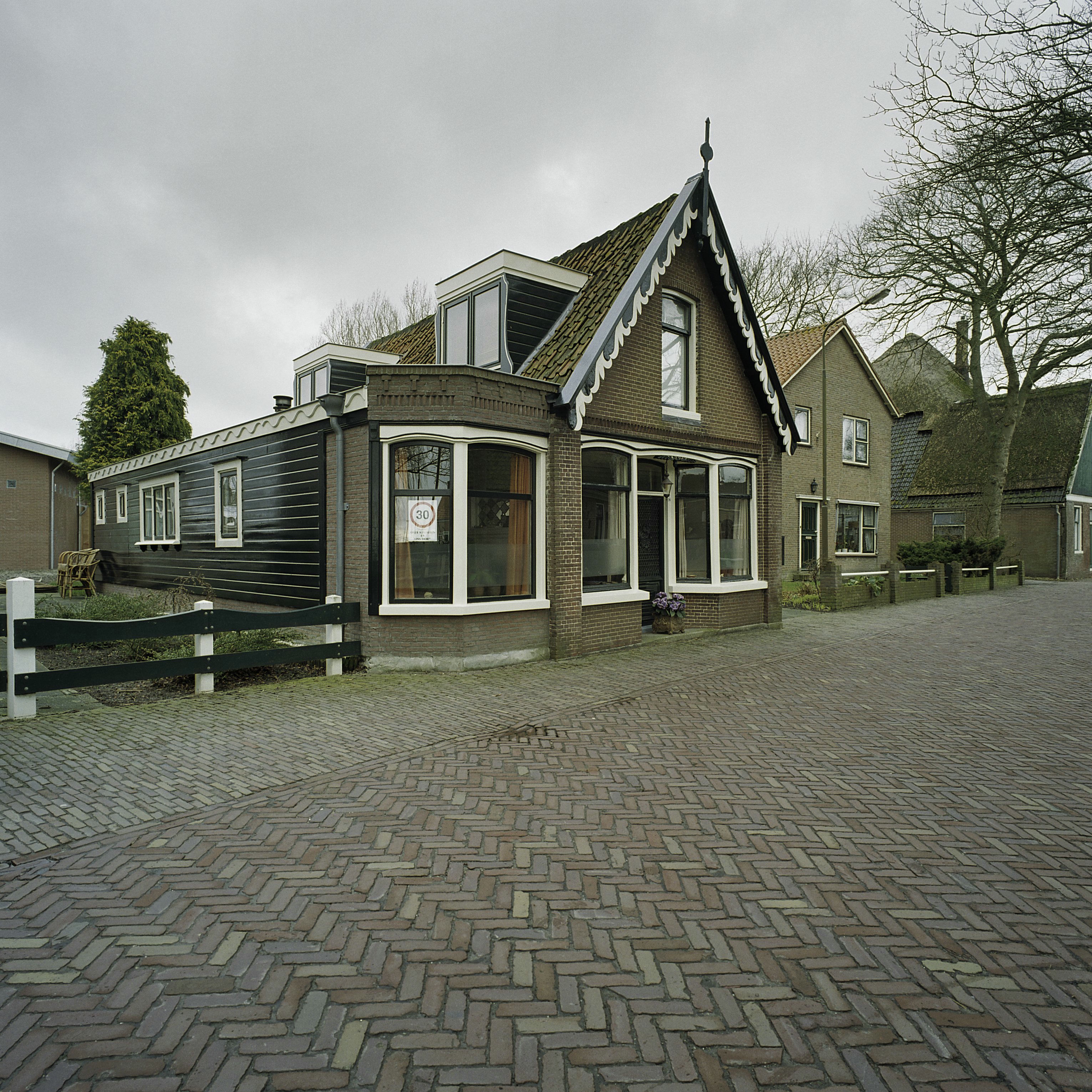
Residential home with shop
