= Nibbixwoud =

- Village
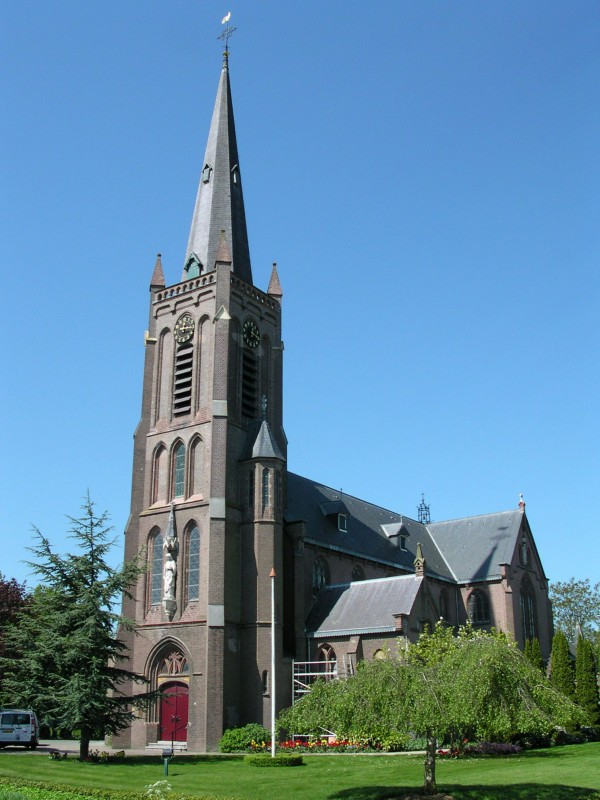
- Catholic St Cunera Church

- Location in the Netherlands Location in the province of North Holland in the Netherlands
- Coordinates: 52°41′34″N 5°3′19″E
- Country: Netherlands
- Province: North Holland
- Municipality: Medemblik

Area
  - Village: 5.13 km^{2} (1.98 sq mi)
- Elevation: −0.7 m (−2.3 ft)

Population (2025)
  - Village: 2,580
  - Density: 503/km^{2} (1,300/sq mi)
  - Urban: 2,195
  - Rural: 380
- Time zone: UTC+1 (CET)
  - Summer (DST): UTC+2 (CEST)
- Postal code: 1688
- Dialing code: 0229

Nibbixwoud is a village in the Dutch province of North Holland. It is a part of the municipality of Medemblik, and lies about 5 km north of Hoorn.

== History ==
The village was first mentioned around 1312 as Nuweboxwoude, and means "the new forest of Bok (person)". New was added to distinguish from Oudeboxwoude which is nowadays called Hauwert. Nibbixwoud developed in the 11th century as a peat excavation area.

The Dutch Reformed church is an aisleless church which was built in 1834 to replace its 14th century predecessor. In 1860, the town hall was constructed in front of the church at a right angle. The church was decommissioned in 1980 and became a cultural centre. The church and town hall have been converted into a single building in 1982.

Nibbixwoud was home to 280 people in 1840. It was a separate municipality until 1979, when it was merged with Wognum. In 2007, it became part of the municipality of Medemblik.

== Gallery ==
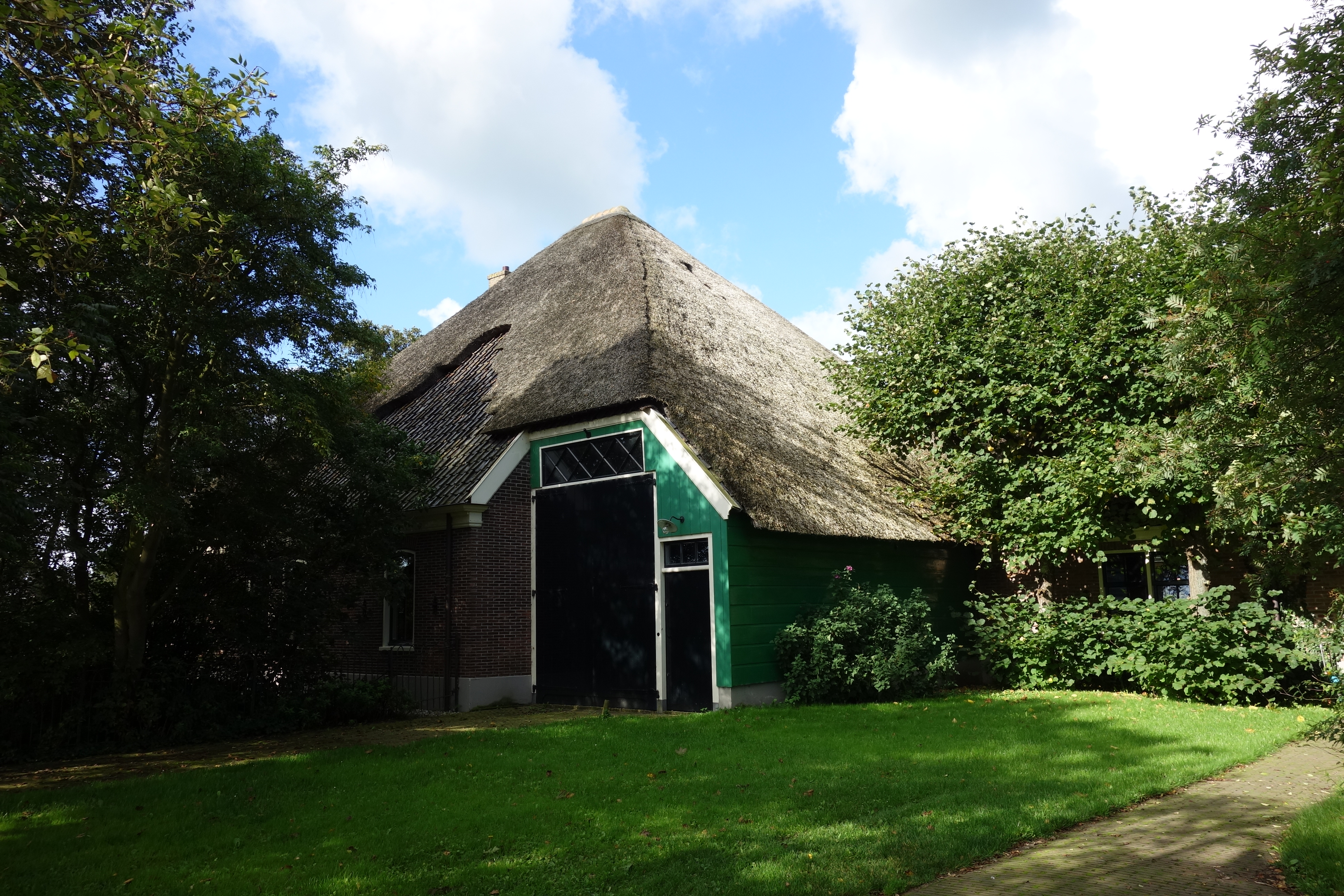
Farm in Nibbixwoud

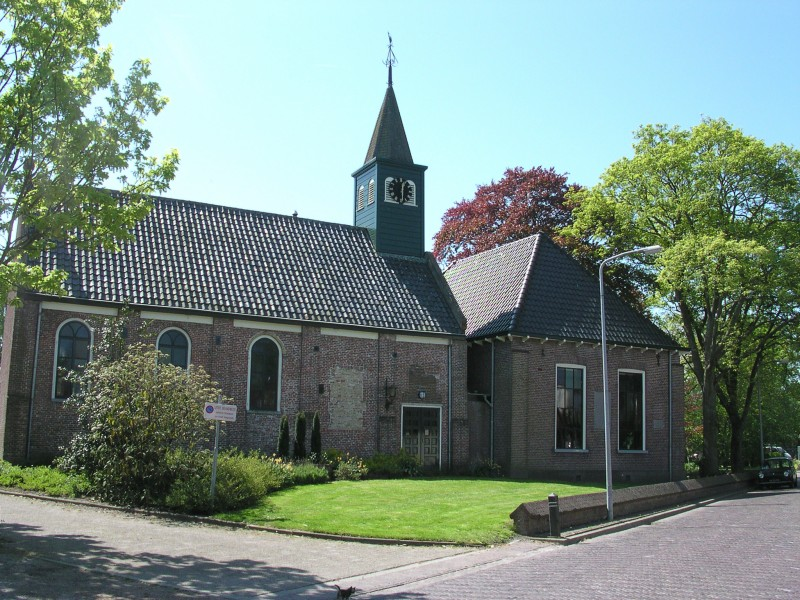
Church and Cultural Centre 'Bessie'

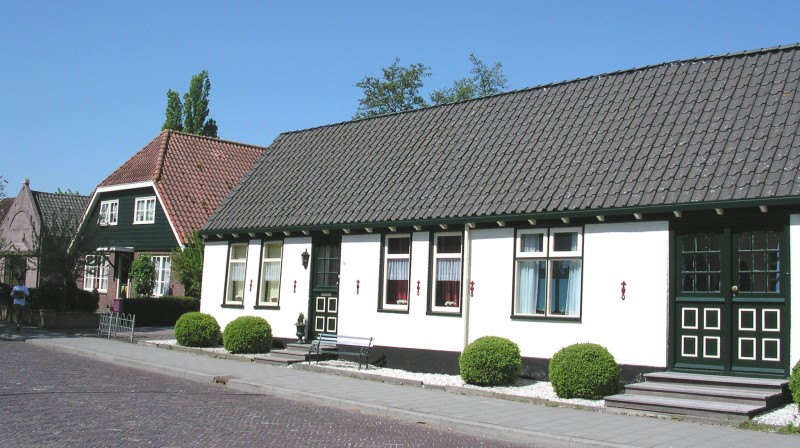
Nibbixwoud
