= Lambertschaag =

- Village
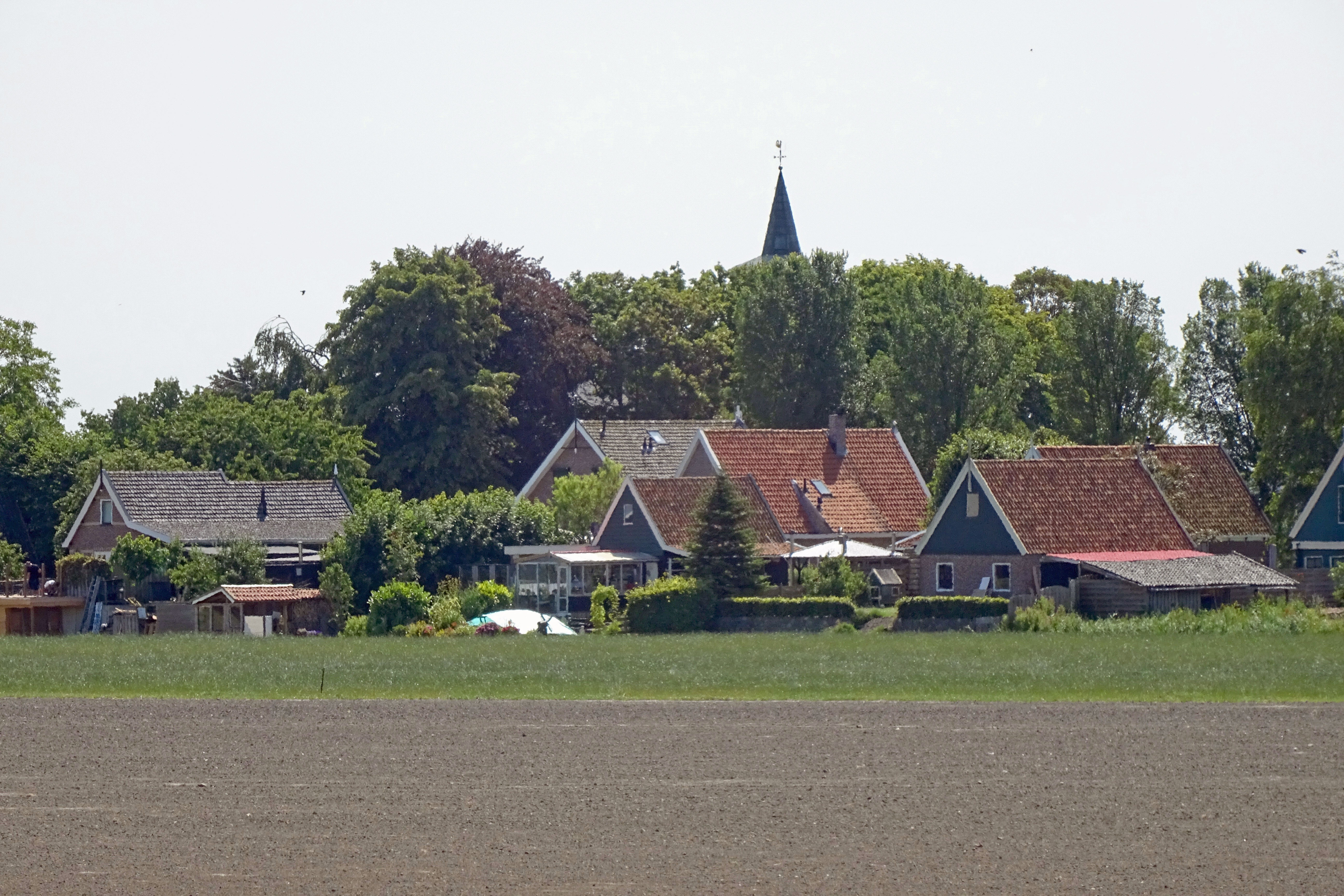
- View on Lambertschaag

- Flag

- Location in the Netherlands Location in the province of North Holland in the Netherlands
- Coordinates: 52°44′45″N 5°1′0″E
- Country: Netherlands
- Province: North Holland
- Municipality: Medemblik

Area
  - Total: 3.55 km^{2} (1.37 sq mi)
- Elevation: −0.9 m (−3.0 ft)

Population (2025)
  - Total: 170
  - Density: 48/km^{2} (120/sq mi)
- Time zone: UTC+1 (CET)
  - Summer (DST): UTC+2 (CEST)
- Postal code: 1658
- Dialing code: 0229

Lambertschaag is a village in the Dutch province of North Holland. It is a part of the municipality of Medemblik, and lies about 12 km north of Hoorn.

The village of Lambertschaag is built along one road, going from Abbekerk on the south to the Wieringermeer polder on the north.

== History ==
The village was first mentioned around 1312 as Lambrechtscoch, and is a combination of "land on water" and Lambert of Maastricht, the patron saint of the village. Lambertschaag developed in the late-11th century as a peat excavation village of Abbekerk. It used to have a little fishing harbour until the Wieringermeer was poldered between 1929 and 1930.

The former Dutch Reformed church which is colloquially called the green church is a single aisled with a wooden ridge turret. It dates from around 1500. The ridge turret was added around 1740. The church is nowadays used for cultural activities, expositions and concerts.

Lambertschaag was home to 226 people in 1840. In 1887, a combined railway station with Abbekerk opened on the Hoorn to Medemblik railway line. The railway line closed in 1941.

== Gallery ==
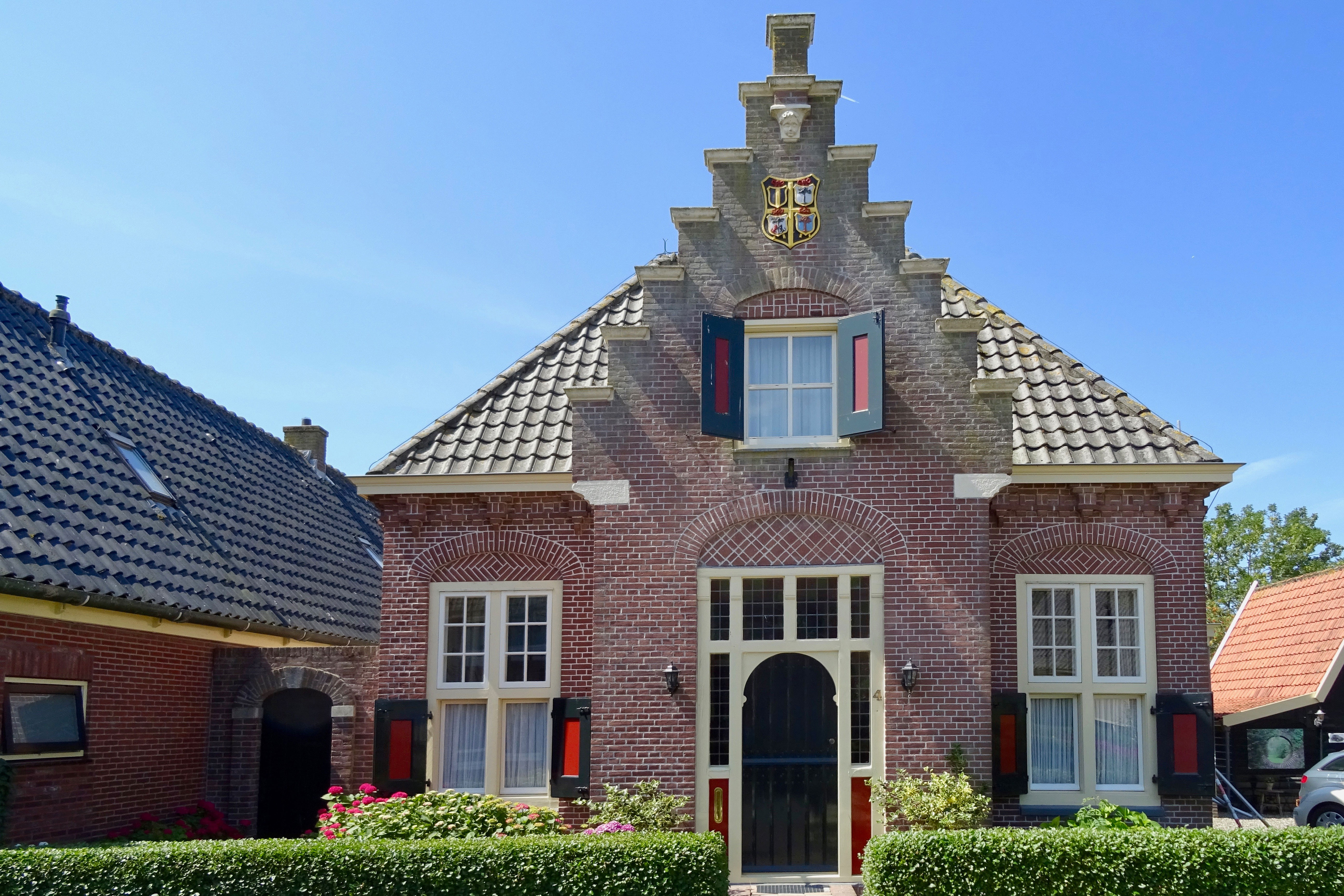
The Koggenhuis

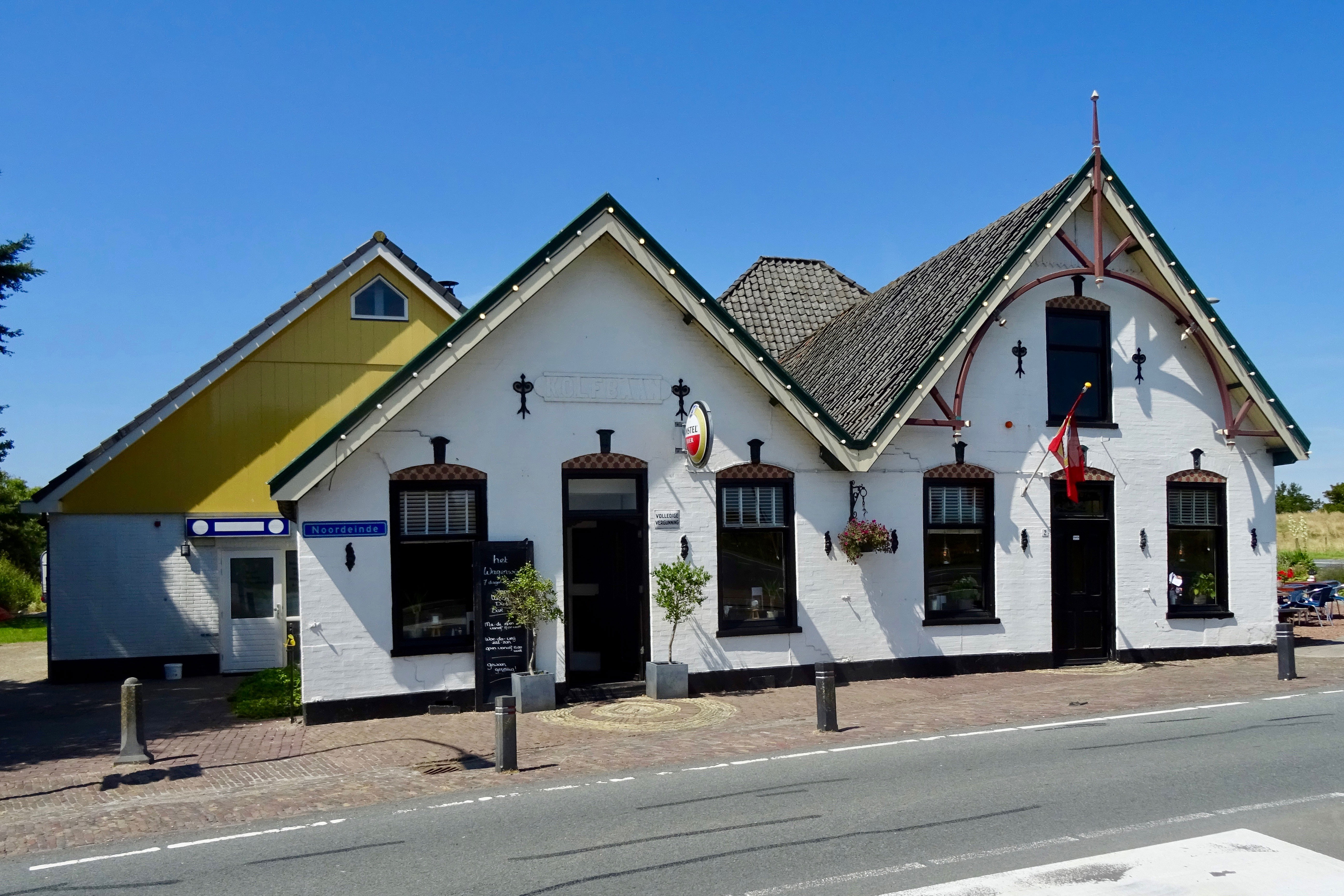
Pub in Lambertschaag

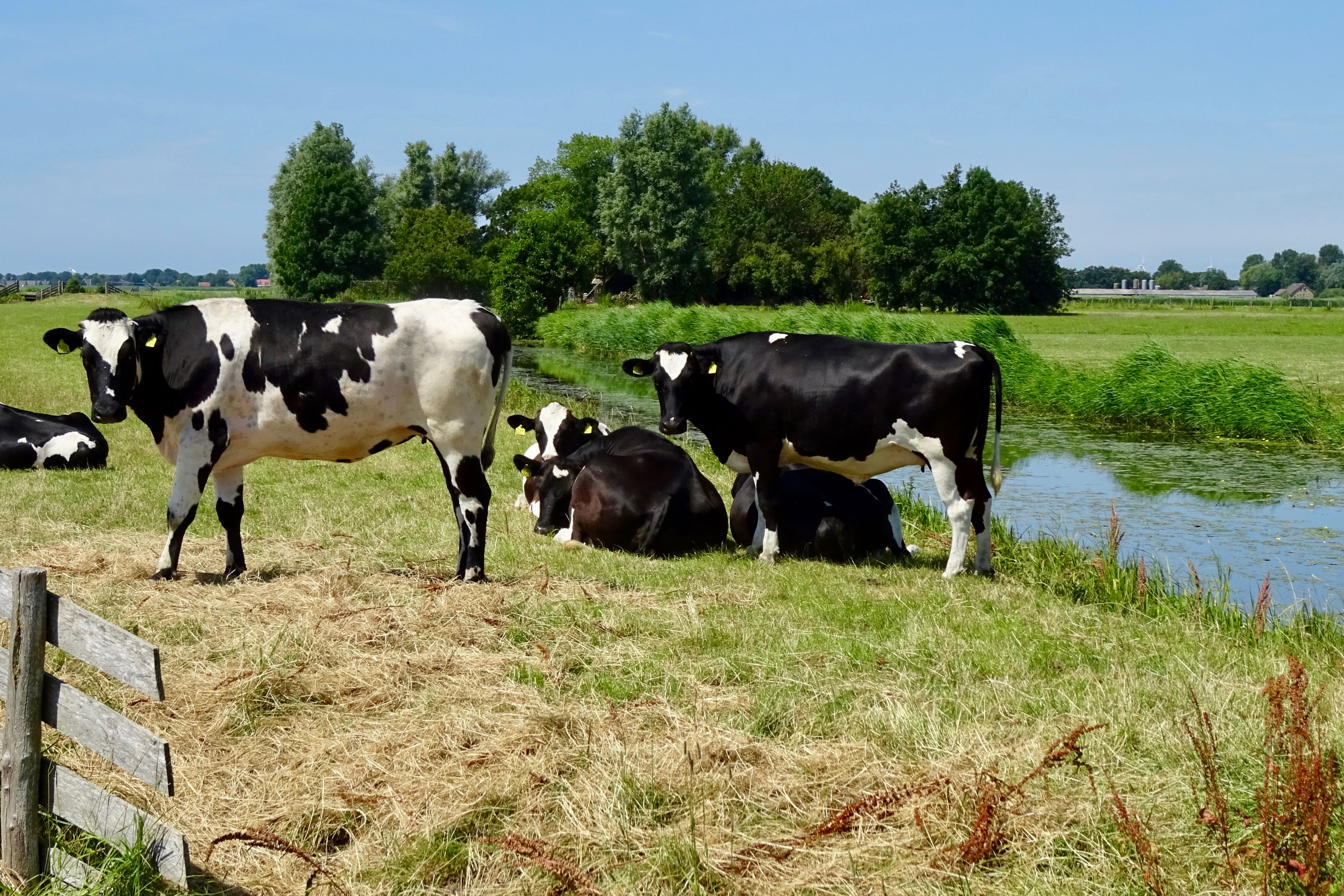
Cows in the field

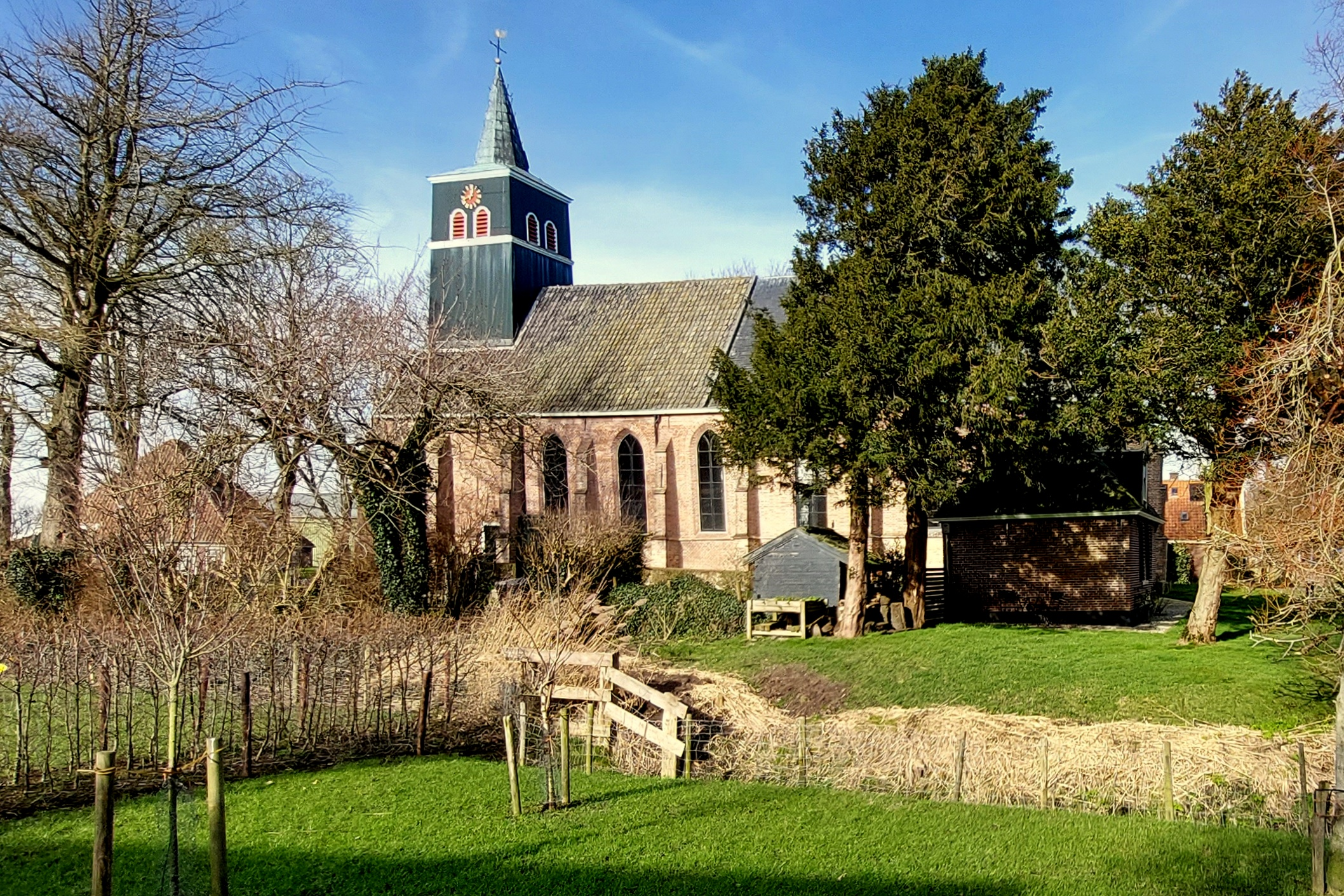
The green church of Lambertschaag
