= Jan Vriend =

Dutch composer (born 1938)

Jan Vriend (born November 1938 in Benningbroek) is a Dutch classical music composer, conductor, organist and pianist. He lives in Gloucestershire, England, and has lived there since 1984.

== Studies and career ==
Vriend studied at the Amsterdam Conservatory from 1960 to 1967, with Else Krijgsman (piano), Anthon van der Horst and Jan Felderhof (music theory), and Ton de Leeuw (composition). During this period, he also studied electronic music with Gottfried Michael Koenig at the University of Utrecht.

Vriend won the Conservatoire of Amsterdam Prize for Composition (1967), the Schnittger Organ Prize (1966) for his composition Herfst (Dutch for "Autumn") and the Gaudeamus International Composers Award with Huantan in 1970.

As a conductor, Vriend has directed several choirs and instrumental ensembles which perform both early and contemporary music. Perhaps the best-known of these is the ASKO Ensemble, which he founded in 1965.

== Discography ==
- 1978 - Variations on Bart Berman, piano: Vriend, Hekster, Loevendie, De Vries, Kleinbussink (Golf)
- Elements of logic, Huantan. Residentie Orchestra with conductor Ernest Bour and Radio Wind Ensemble with conductor Hans Vonk
- Herostase by Harrie Starreveld, flute and Harry Sparnaay, bass clarinet (Music + Practice)
- 1996 - Hallelujah II on Asko Ensemble (conductor David Porcelijn) plays Jan Vriend, Willem Boogman, Klas Torstensson (Donemus)
- 1996 - Huantan on Fifty Years International Gaudeamus Music Week (Donemus)
- 2009 - Entre el olivo y el hombre. Du-Dich-Dir. Choir-book (part 1). Ensembles. Nederlands Kamerkoor, Klaas Stok (KTC)
- 2010 - Jets d'orgue for organ, recorded at Haarlem St. Bavo church by Jan Hage
