= Opperdoes =

- Village
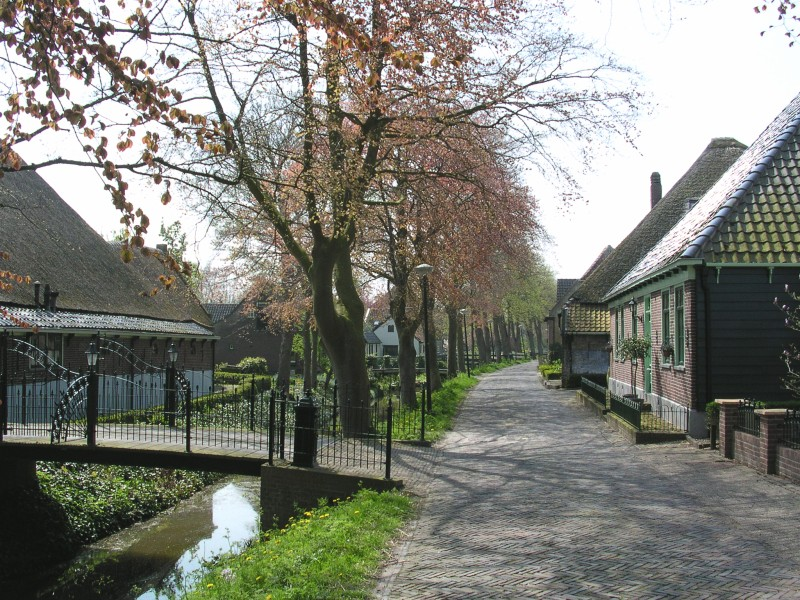
- Typical Opperdoes street

- Flag Coat of arms

- Location in the Netherlands Location in the province of North Holland in the Netherlands
- Coordinates: 52°46′N 5°3′E
- Country: Netherlands
- Province: North Holland
- Municipality: Medemblik

Area
  - Village: 3.28 km^{2} (1.27 sq mi)
- Elevation: −0.8 m (−2.6 ft)

Population (2025)
  - Village: 2,010
  - Density: 613/km^{2} (1,590/sq mi)
  - Urban: 1,815
  - Rural: 195
- Time zone: UTC+1 (CET)
  - Summer (DST): UTC+2 (CEST)
- Postal code: 1674
- Dialing code: 0227

Opperdoes is a village in the Dutch province of North Holland. It is a part of the municipality of Medemblik, and lies about 12 km north of Hoorn. It has a certain fame for its local variety of potatoes, "Opperdoezer Ronde", which has Protected designation of origin status in the European Union and may only be grown in the area around Opperdoes.

The village was first mentioned in the late 11th century as Those, and means "bog with moss". Opper (upper) could have been added to distinguish from Nederdoes, a village lost in the Zuiderzee.

== History ==
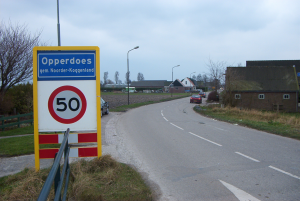

The exact age of the village of Opperdoes is hard to determine. The village used to be located very close to the sea, and the area has been flooded several times. Initial settlements seem to have been abandoned after the year 300 because of large floods. New villages were later built on terps.

Opperdoes used to be located 4 or 5 kilometres from the sea-dike that existed around 781. However, the dike was in a very bad condition and in 1318 Willem van Henegouwen, the ruler, agreed the build a new dike. In 1334 a new dike was built between Medemblik and Barsingerhorn.

The new dike was built 4 kilometres southwards of the old one and Almersdorp, a village, was left outside the new dike.

In 1517 the old church of Opperdoes and many buildings were destroyed by Grote Pier and his Frisian army, the Gelderse Friezen.

A new church was built, and it was ready in 1530. The top of the tower of the church was replaced in 1838, after it was destroyed in a storm in November 1836.

Opperdoes was a separate municipality between 1817 and 1979, when the new municipality of Noorder-Koggenland was created. On 1 January 2007, Noorder-Koggenland merged with Medemblik and Wognum into the new municipality of Medemblik.

== Important buildings and locations ==
A touristic attraction is the old steam railway station on the railway between Hoorn and Medemblik. The station building dates from 1887 and is a listed monument. It was in regular service until 1941 and is now used by the Museumstoomtram.

== Religion ==
Religion has played an important part in the village in the last two centuries. Opperdoes is considered an orthodox village in a fairly liberal minded area. In earlier times the villagers of Opperdoes were called the Turks: they were a particularly free-minded people, in line with the other villages in the area, that enjoyed life to the fullest.

Around 1822, Jan Mazereeuw, the so-called Profete of Opperdoes, preached in the village. He was a farmer and had been mayor of the village for a while during the French occupation. He called the Reformed Church a godless temple and preached a very sober lifestyle. Although he never had a large crowd of followers, it is generally assumed that a part of the village's orthodoxy can be explained by his preachings.

== Statistics ==
In 2001, the village centre of Opperdoes had 1,442 inhabitants. The built-up area of the village was 0.31 km^{2}, and contained 555 residences. The wider statistical area of Opperdoes has a population of around 1,750.
