= Hauwert =

- Village
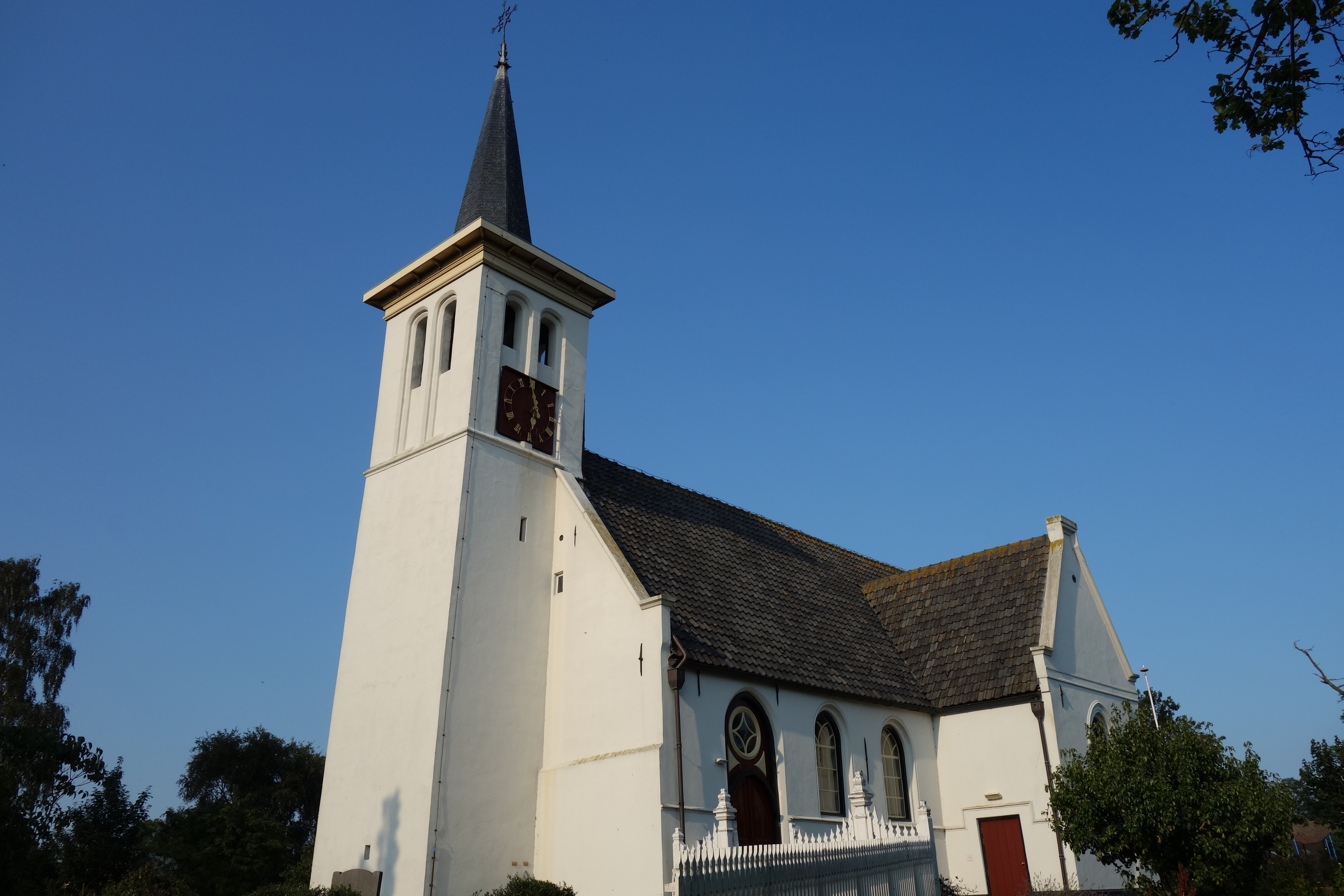
- Dutch Reformed church

- Flag Coat of arms

- Location in the Netherlands Location in the province of North Holland in the Netherlands
- Coordinates: 52°43′N 5°6′E
- Country: Netherlands
- Province: North Holland
- Municipality: Medemblik

Area
  - Total: 6.10 km^{2} (2.36 sq mi)
- Elevation: −1.4 m (−4.6 ft)

Population (2025)
  - Total: 740
  - Density: 120/km^{2} (310/sq mi)
- Time zone: UTC+1 (CET)
  - Summer (DST): UTC+2 (CEST)
- Postal code: 1691
- Dialing code: 0229

Hauwert is a village in the Dutch province of North Holland. It is a part of the municipality of Medemblik, and lies about 7 km north of Hoorn.

== History ==
Hauwert is thought to have been founded between 950 and 1050. It was first mentioned around 1312 as Oudeboxwoude. The etymology is unknown. In the past Oude (old) was added to distinguish from Nibbixwoud.

The Dutch Reformed church was first mentioned in 1395. The current church dates from the 15th century. The tower is from the 16th century and has been enlarged during the 17th century.

Hauwert was home to 301 people in 1840. From 1816 to 1979, it was part of the municipality of Nibbixwoud and from 1979 to 2007 it was part of the municipality of Noorder-Koggenland.

Most of the population lives outside the centre, along the road between Nibbixwoud and Wervershoof.

== Gallery ==
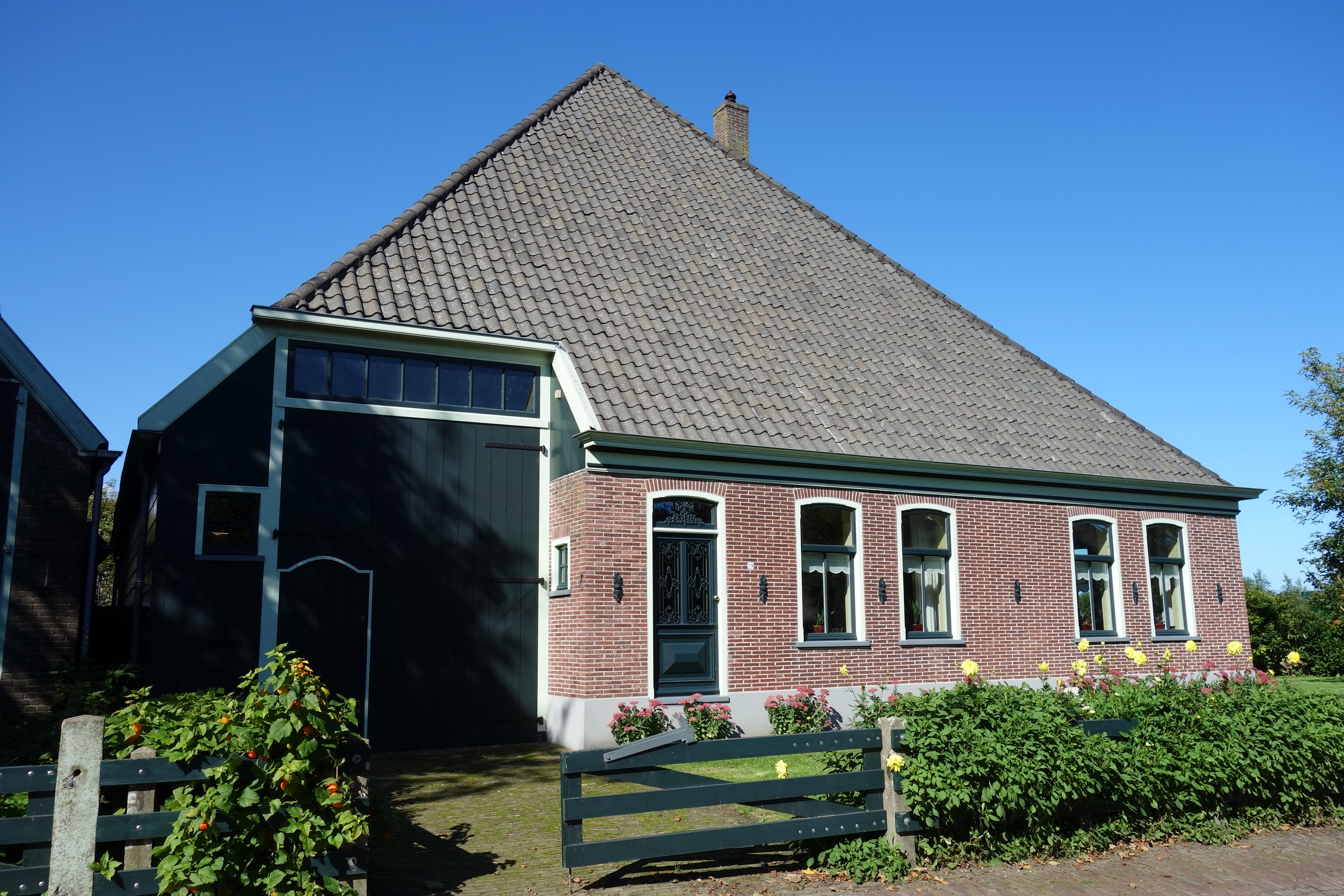
Farm in Hauwert

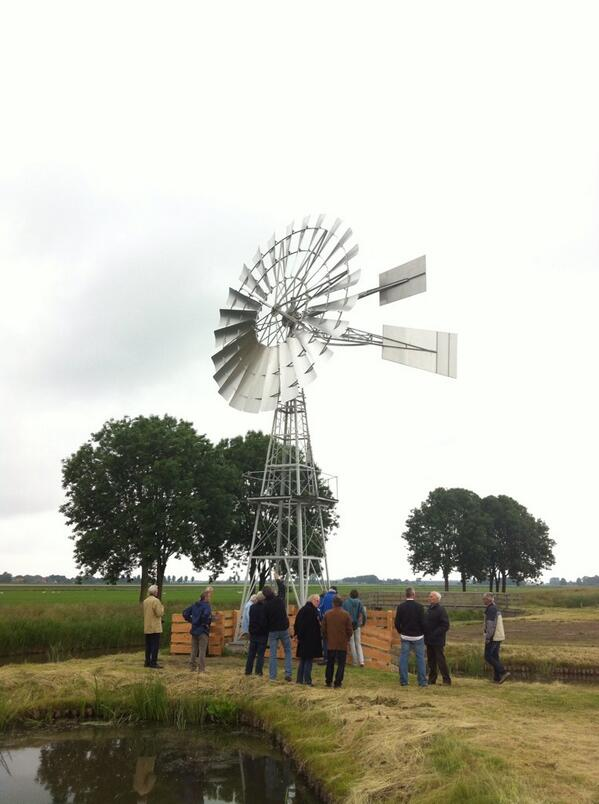
Wind pump

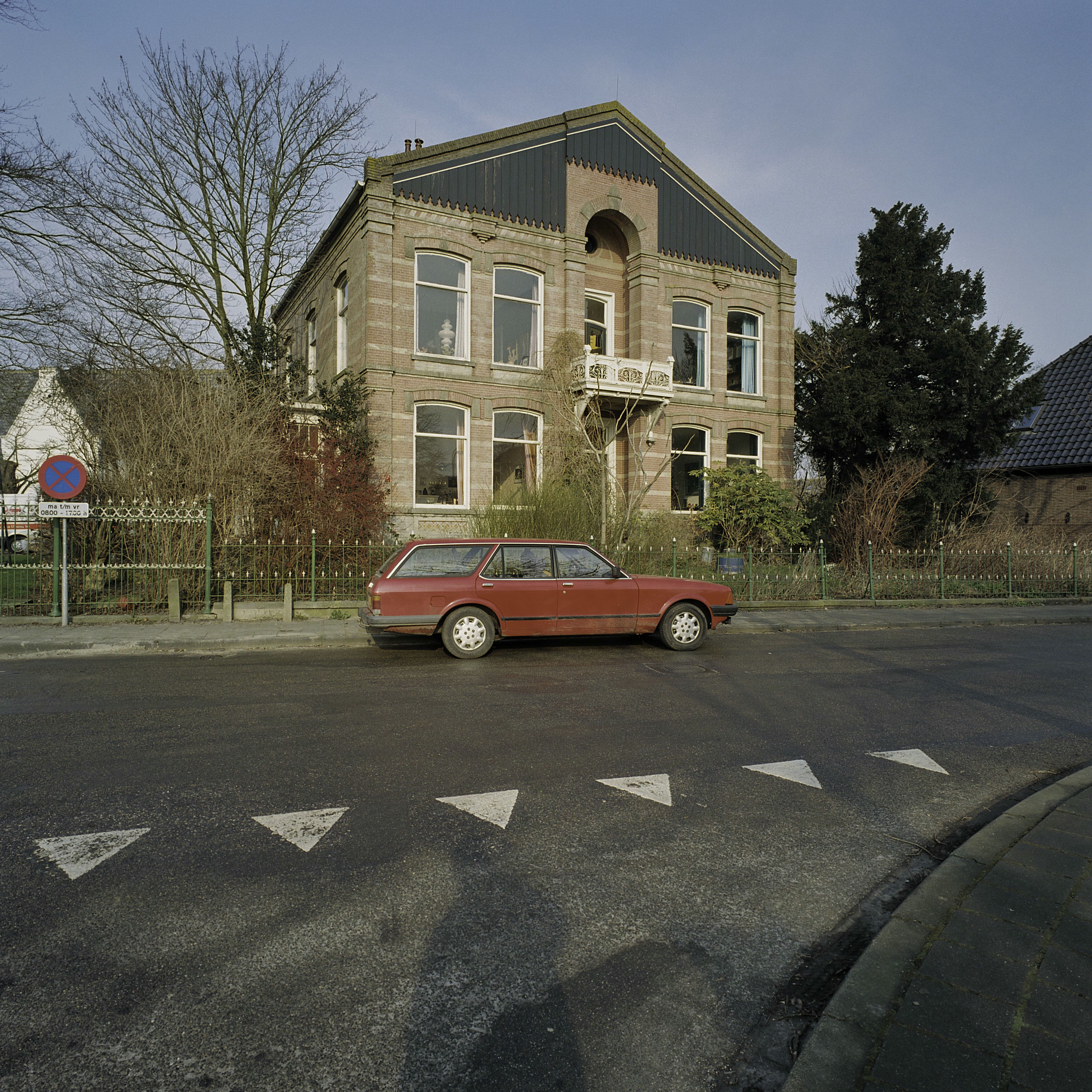
Former clergy house
