= Abbekerk =

- Small city
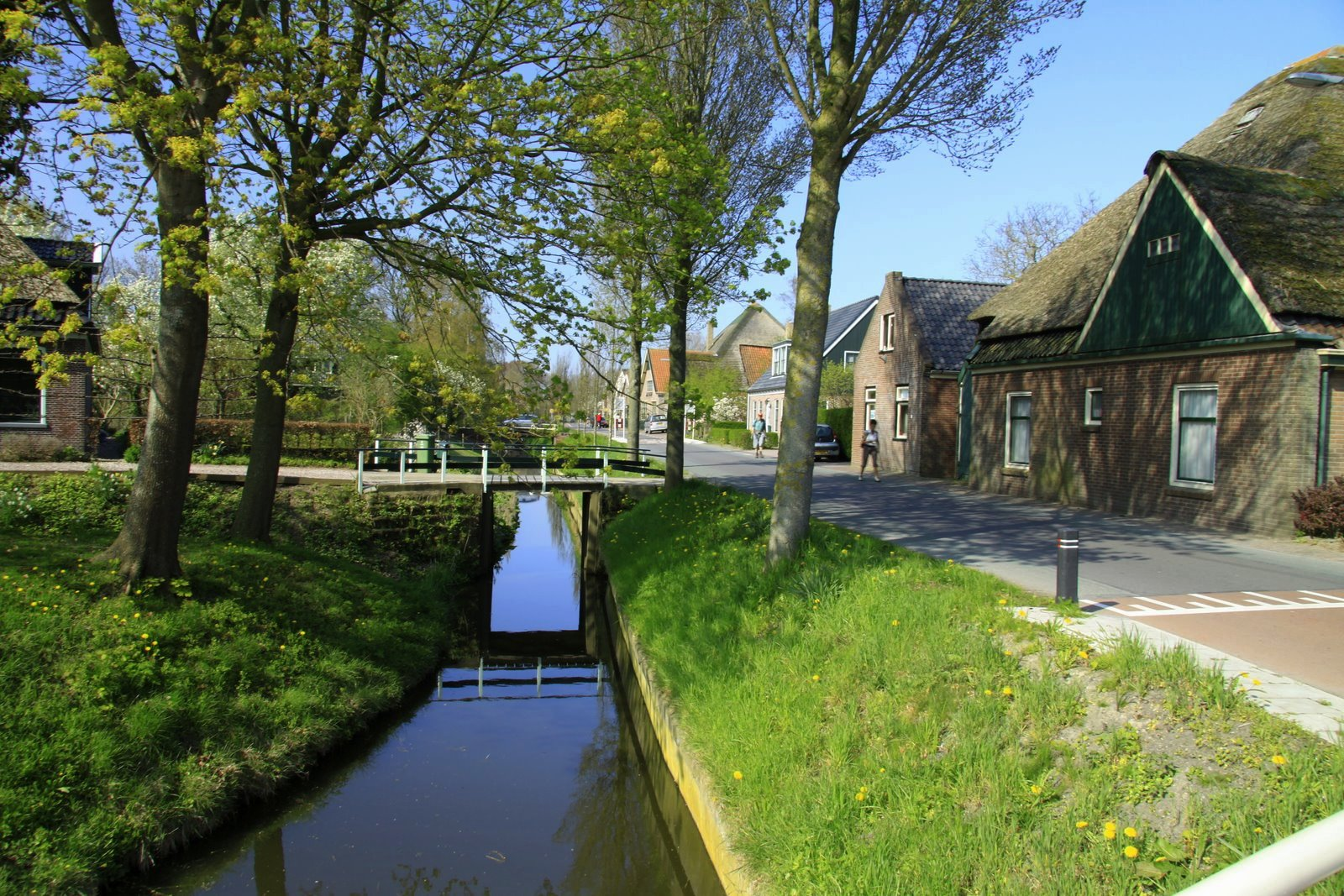
- View on Abbekerk

- Flag Coat of arms

- Location in the Netherlands Location in the province of North Holland in the Netherlands
- Coordinates: 52°44′N 5°1′E
- Country: Netherlands
- Province: North Holland
- Municipality: Medemblik

Area
  - Small city: 3.88 km^{2} (1.50 sq mi)
- Elevation: −0.9 m (−3.0 ft)

Population (2025)
  - Small city: 2,025
  - Density: 522/km^{2} (1,350/sq mi)
  - Urban: 1,935
  - Rural: 85
- Time zone: UTC+1 (CET)
  - Summer (DST): UTC+2 (CEST)
- Postal code: 1657
- Dialing code: 0229

Abbekerk is a small city in the Dutch province of North Holland. It is a part of the municipality of Medemblik, and lies about 9 km north of Hoorn.

== History ==
Abbekerk was first mentioned around 1312 as Abbenkerke, and means "(private) church of Abbe (person)". Abbekerk developed as a peat excavation settlement in the 11th century. It received city rights in 1414. The city rights ended in 1795.

The Dutch Reformed church of Abbekerk is a single aisled church. The nave was built around 1500 and enlarged in 1517. It has a tower dating from 1656. The brick spire was restored in 1859.

Abbekerk was home to 422 people in 1840. In 1887, a combined railway station with Lambertschaag opened on the Hoorn to Medemblik railway line. The railway line closed in 1941. It used to be a separate municipality. In 1979, it was merged into Noorder-Koggenland. In 2007, it became part of the municipality of Medemblik.

== Gallery ==
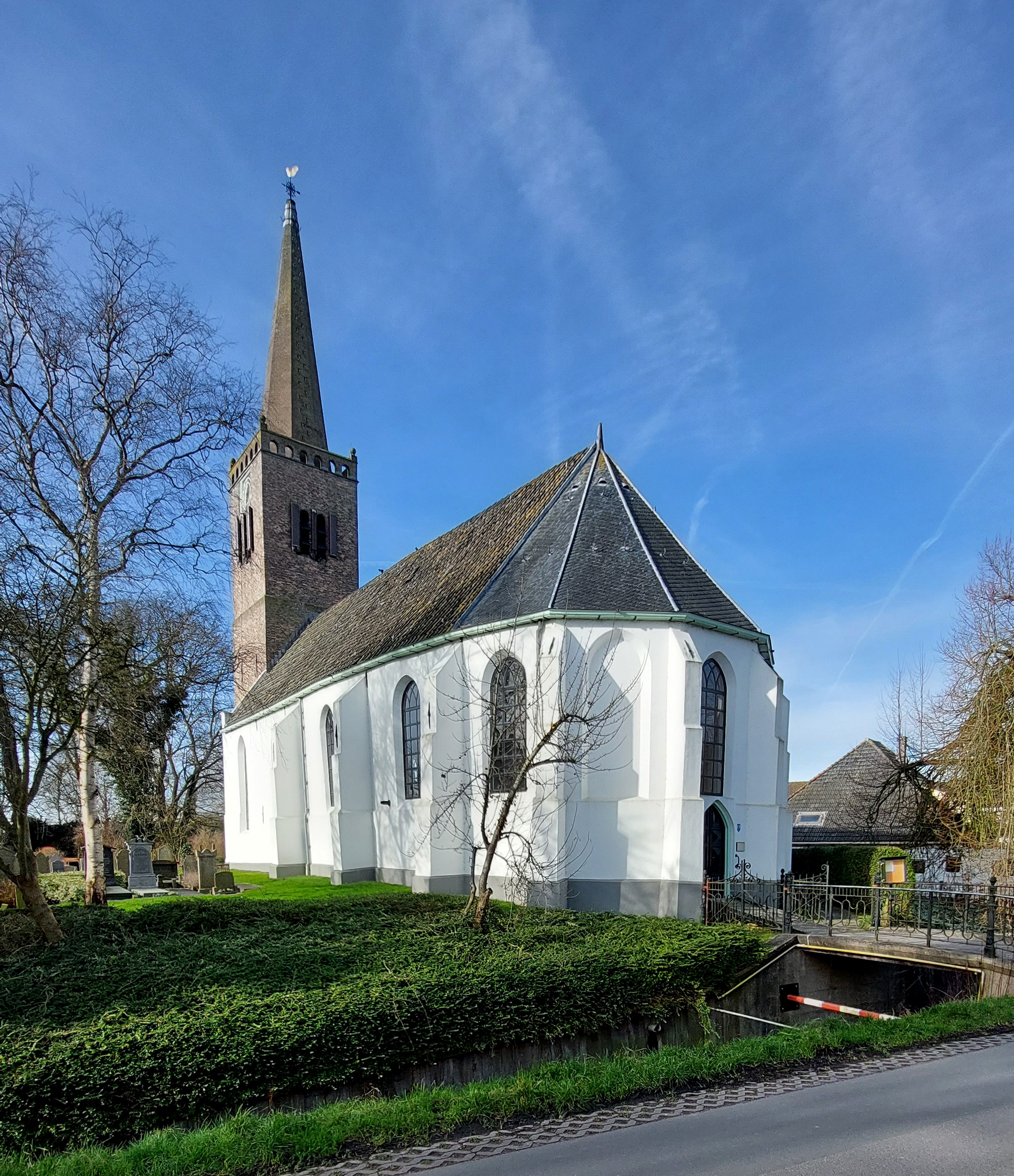
Dutch Reformed church

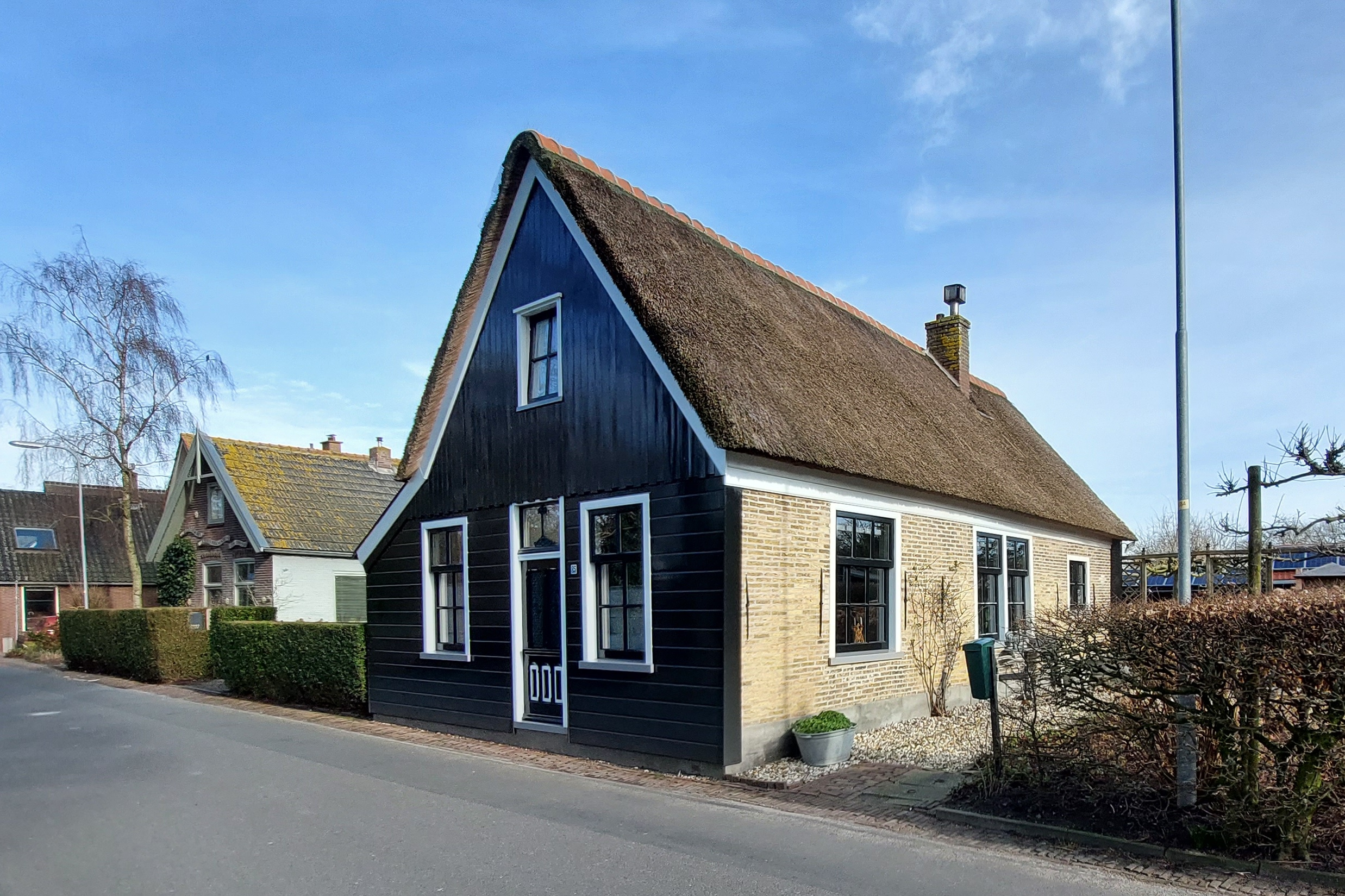
House in Abbekerk

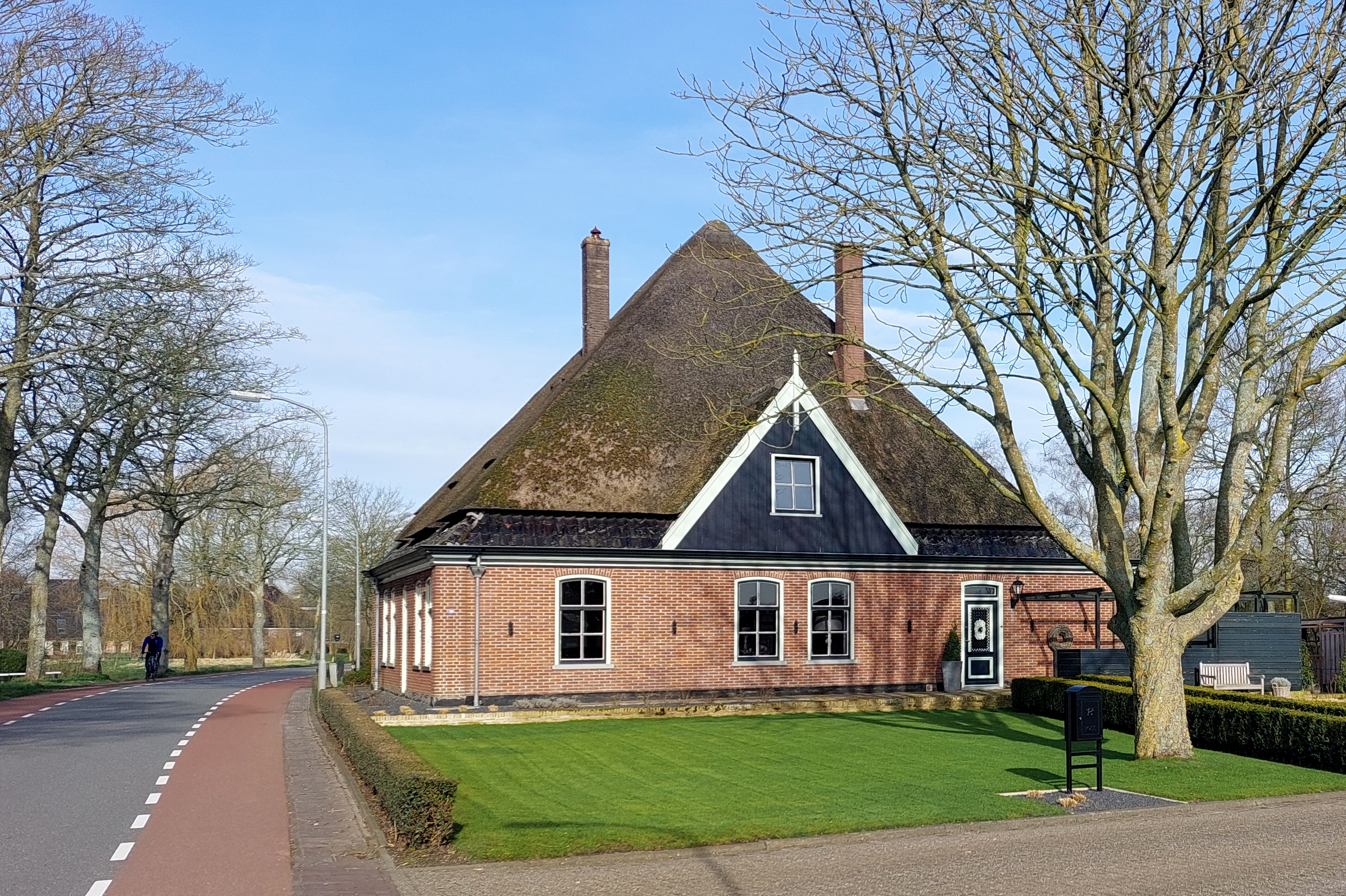
Farm in Abbekerk

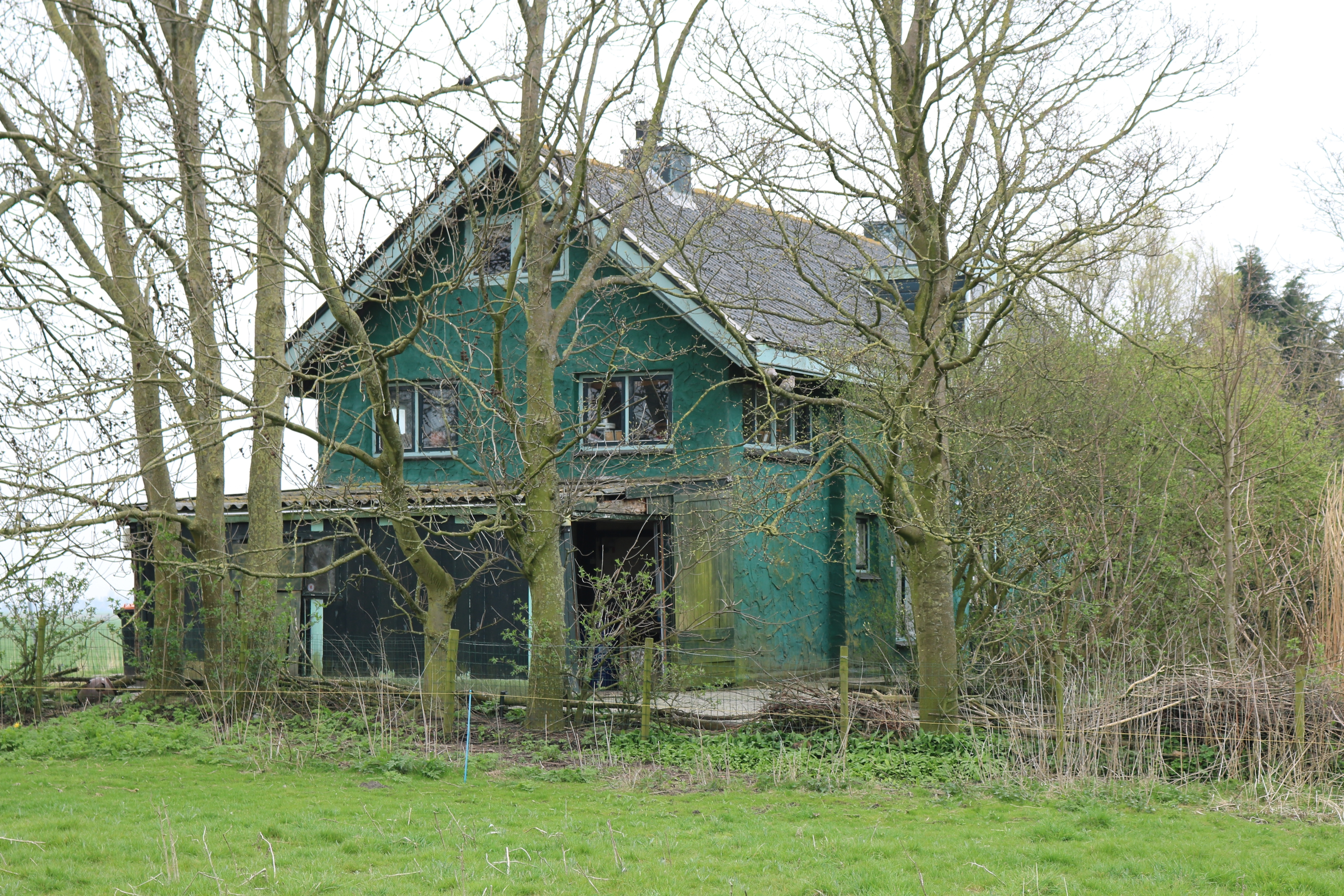
Former railway station Abbekerk-Lambertschaag
