= Benningbroek =

- Village
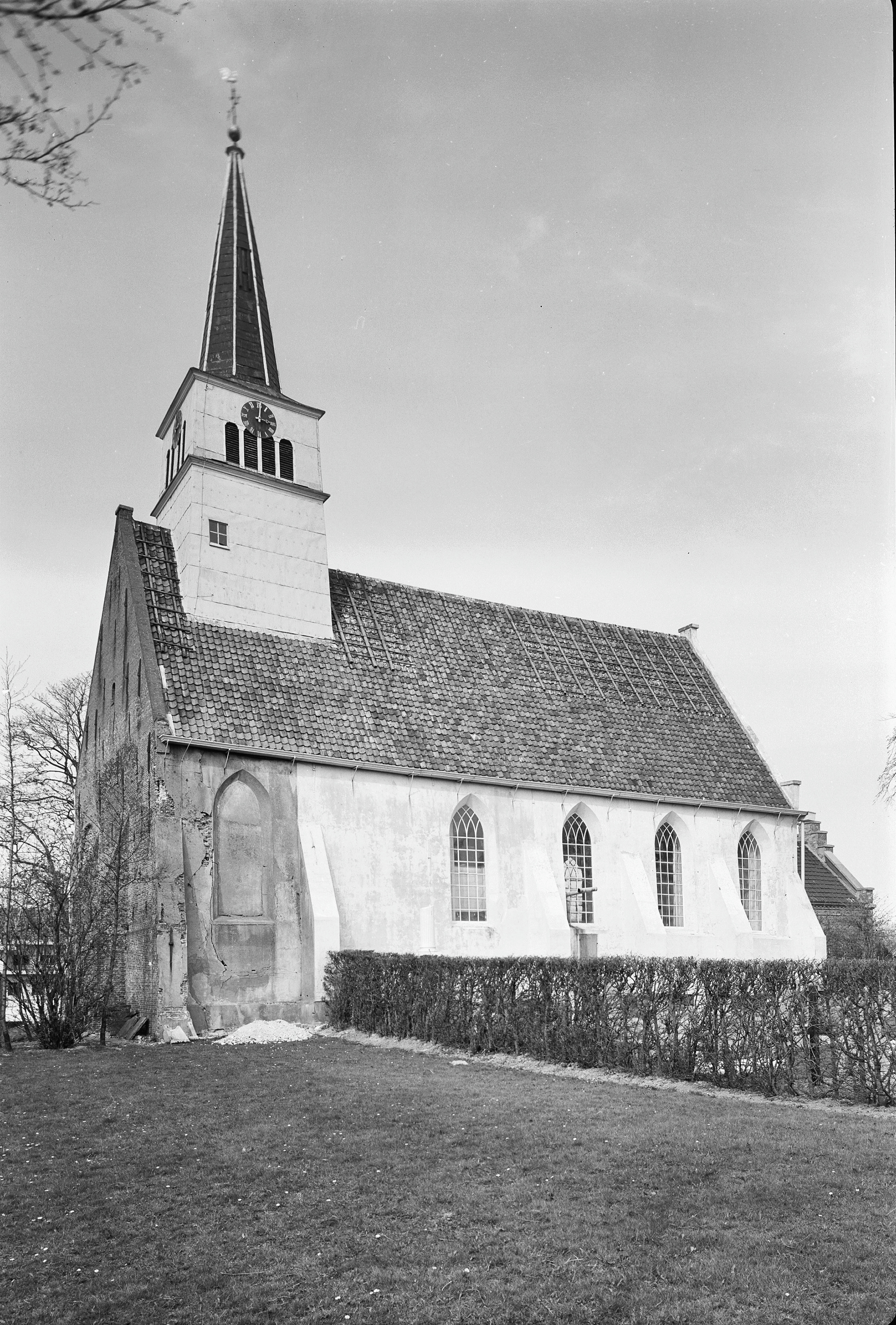
- Dutch Reformed church

- Location in the Netherlands Location in the province of North Holland in the Netherlands
- Coordinates: 52°42′11″N 5°0′35″E
- Country: Netherlands
- Province: North Holland
- Municipality: Medemblik

Area
  - Village: 567 km^{2} (219 sq mi)
- Elevation: −0.6 m (−2.0 ft)

Population (2025)
  - Village: 750
  - Density: 1.3/km^{2} (3.4/sq mi)
  - Urban: 300
  - Rural: 455
- Time zone: UTC+1 (CET)
  - Summer (DST): UTC+2 (CEST)
- Postal code: 1654
- Dialing code: 0229

Benningbroek is a village in the northwest Netherlands. It is located in the municipality of Medemblik, North Holland about 40 km north of Amsterdam. On the western side, Benningbroek has merged with Sijbekarspel.

The village was first mentioned around 1338 as Bennenbroech, and means "swampy land of the people of Benne (person)". Bennebroek developed in the 11th century as a peat excavation settlement.

The Dutch Reformed church is a single aisled church with a tall spire from the 16th century. The choir was demolished at the end of the 18th century.

Benningbroek was home to 461 people in 1840. In 1887, a joint railway station with Sijbekarspel opened on the Hoorn to Medemblik railway line. The line closed in 1941.

== Gallery ==
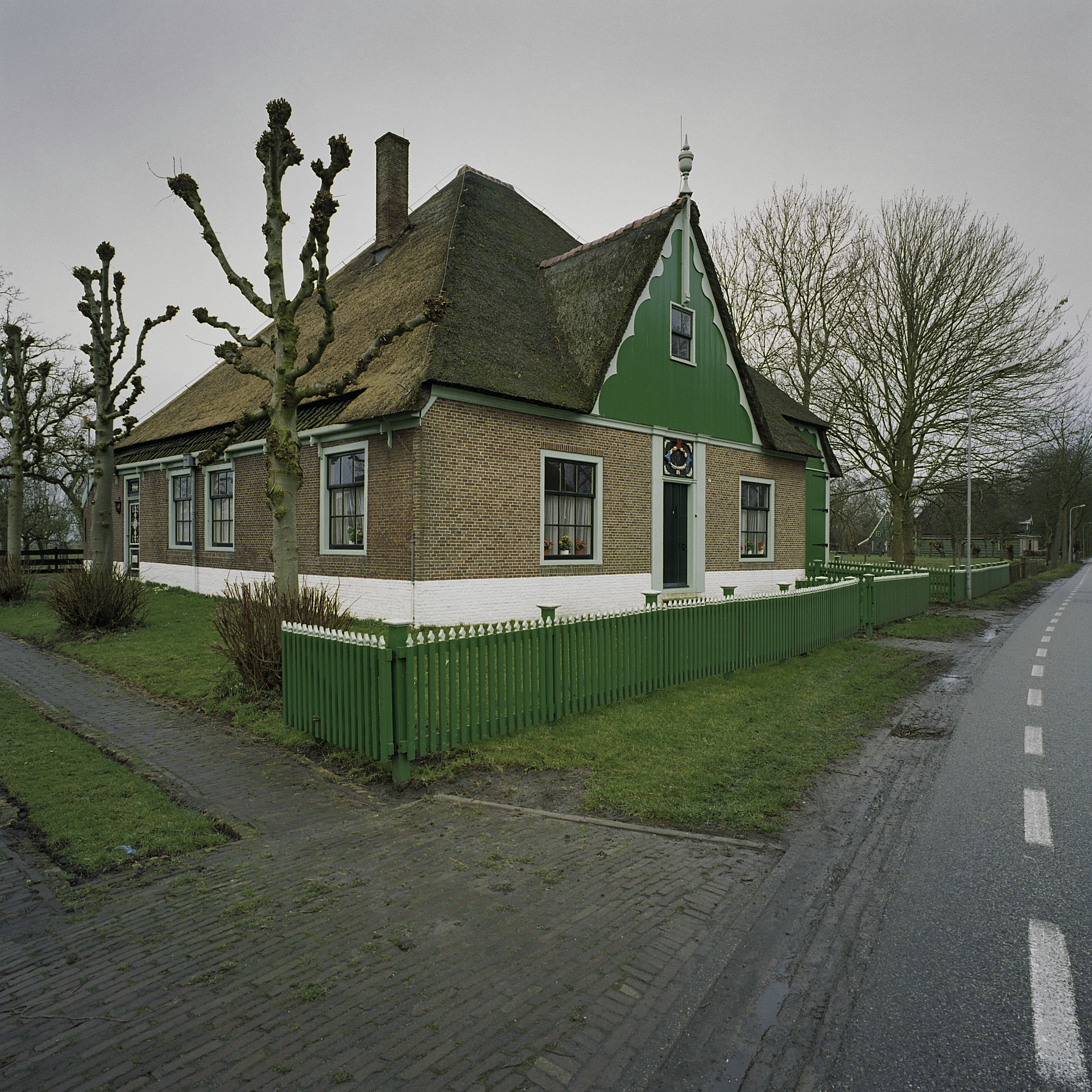
Farm in Benningbroek

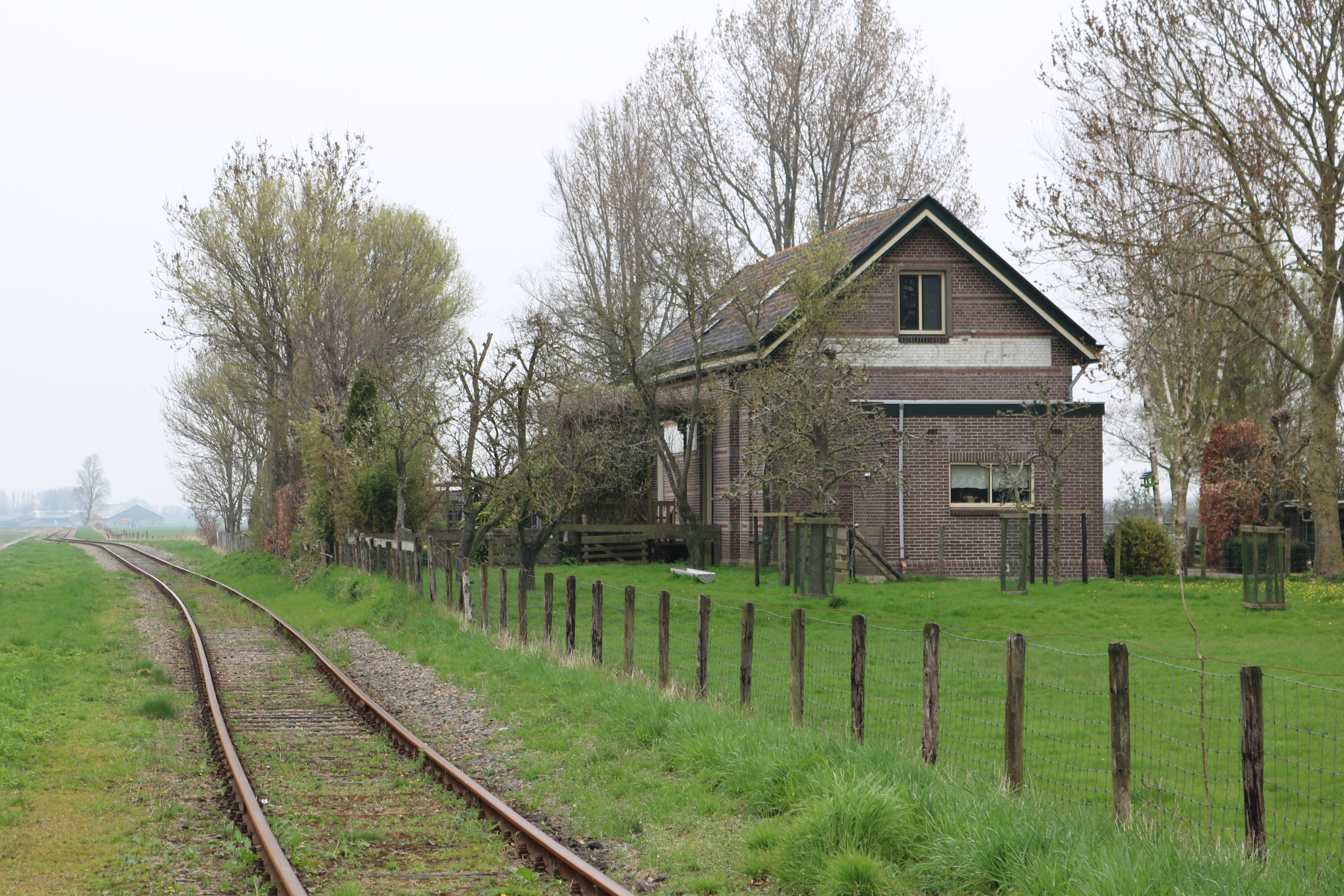
Former railway station Benningbroek-Sijbekarspel

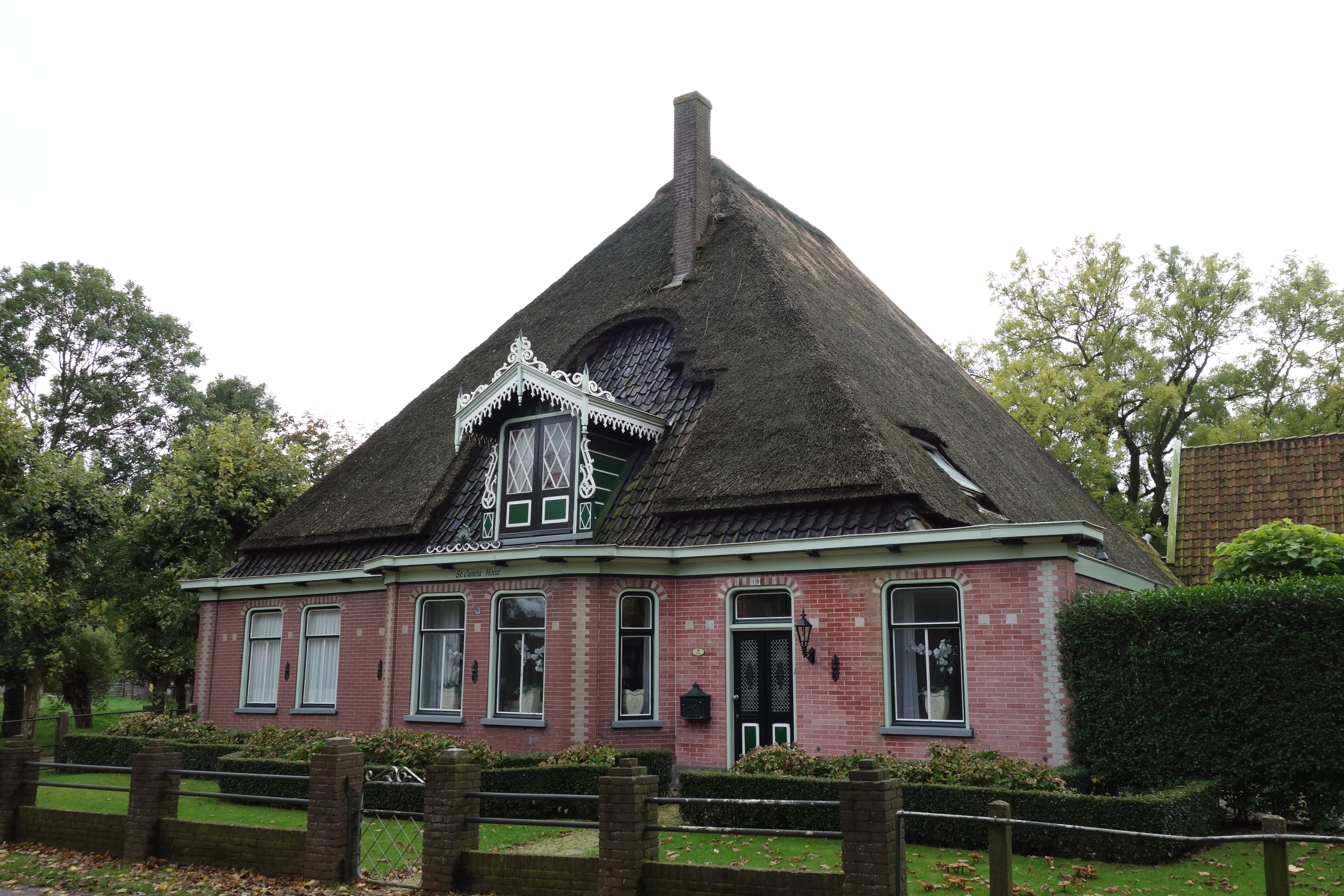
Farm in Benningbroek
