= Medemblik =

- Municipality
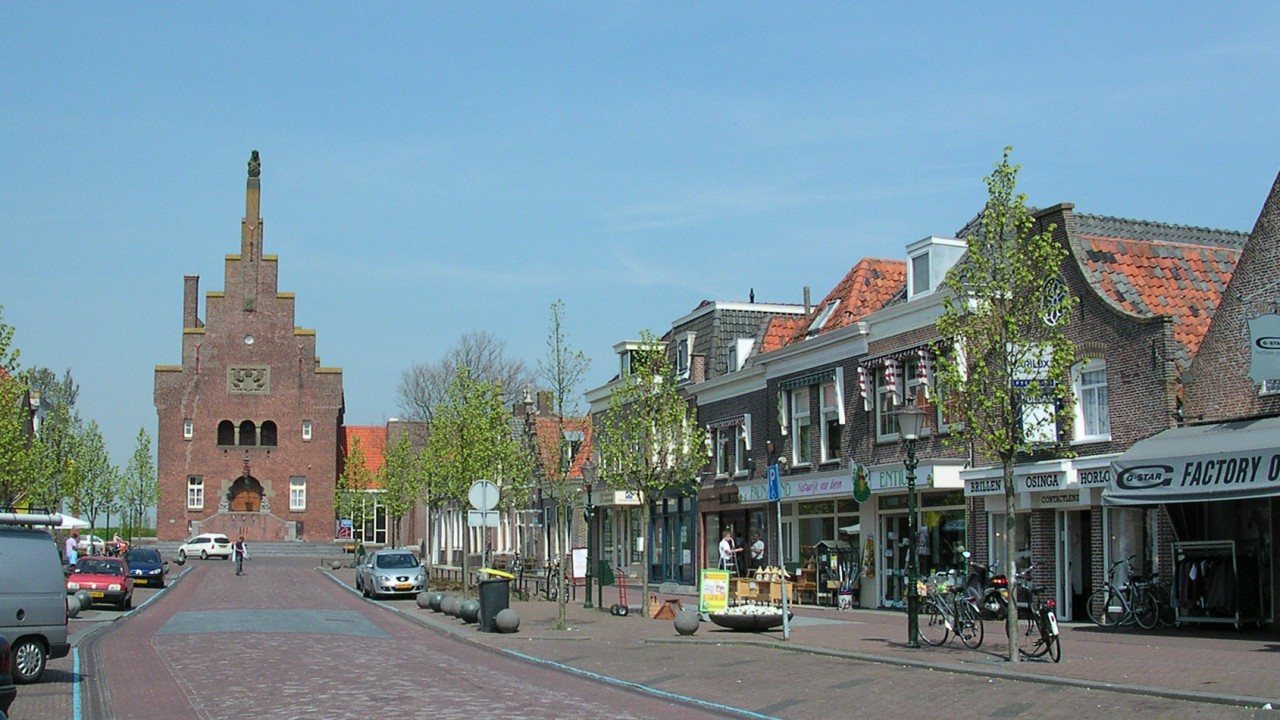
- Medemblik city centre

- Flag Coat of arms

- Location in North Holland

- Location in the Netherlands Location in the province of North Holland in the Netherlands
- Country: Netherlands
- Province: North Holland

Government
  - Body: Municipal council
  - Mayor: Michiel Pijl (CDA)

Area
  - Total: 257.56 km^{2} (99.44 sq mi)
  - Land: 121.42 km^{2} (46.88 sq mi)
  - Water: 136.14 km^{2} (52.56 sq mi)
- Elevation: 0 m (0 ft)

Population (January 2021)
  - Total: 45,165
  - Density: 372/km^{2} (960/sq mi)
- Time zone: UTC+1 (CET)
  - Summer (DST): UTC+2 (CEST)
- Postcode: Parts of 1600 range
- Area code: 0227–0229
- Website: www.medemblik.nl

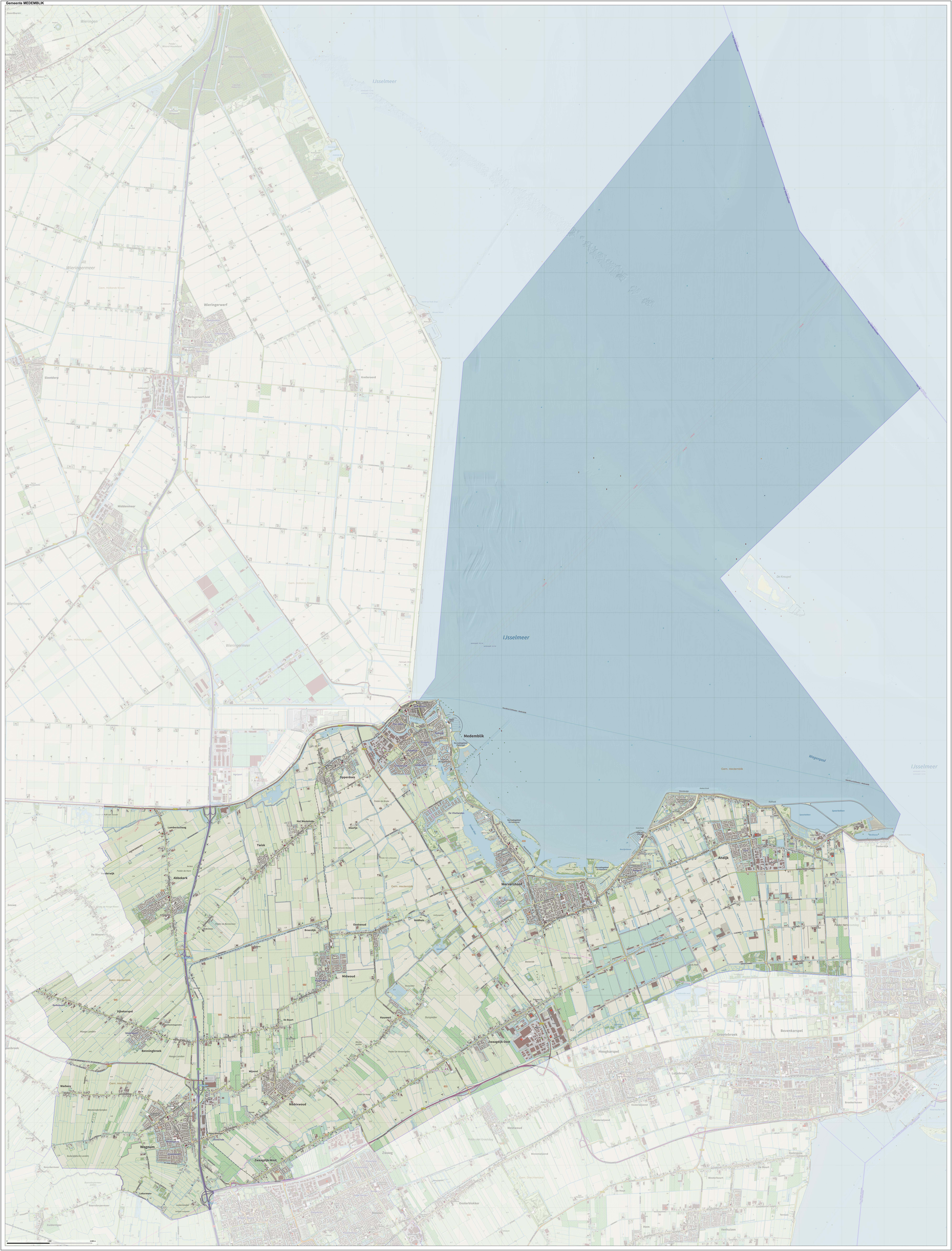
Map of Medemblik, June 2015

Medemblik (Dutch pronunciation: [ˈmeːdəmblɪk]) is a municipality and a city in the Netherlands, in the province of North Holland and the region of West-Frisia. It lies immediately south of the polder and former municipality of Wieringermeer.

== History ==
Medemblik was a prosperous trading town, when in 1282, Floris V, Count of Holland, successfully invaded West Friesland. He built several fortresses to control the region, one of which was Kasteel Radboud in Medemblik, and awarded Medemblik city rights in 1289. After Floris V was murdered in 1296, the local Frisians besieged the castle, but in 1297 an army from Holland thwarted their efforts to starve out the inhabitants, which included Medemblik citizens.

Several more attacks took place in the following centuries. The most notorious of these happened in June 1517, when Medemblik was attacked from mainland Frisia by about 4000 pirates known as the Arumer Zwarte Hoop, led by Pier Gerlofs Donia and Wijard Jelckama. Many citizens fled to the castle, which the pirates unsuccessfully besieged. Eventually, they took out their fury on the town, which burned to the ground. After this the band continued their marauding path on land throughout present day North Holland.

After Medemblik town walls were constructed in 1572, the castle lost its role as a refuge for the citizens, which led to its partially dismantling in 1578. Over the centuries the castle fell into decay, but in 1889 it became property of the crown and was restored to be used as a courthouse, which function it served until 1934. Anticipating the German invasion, the Rijksmuseum in September 1939 chose the castle as the initial hiding place of Rembrandt's Night Watch.

On 1 January 2007 Medemblik merged with the municipalities of Noorder-Koggenland and Wognum. The new municipality was called Medemblik, even though it was the smallest of the three in population. Again, on 1 January 2011, Medemblik merged with Andijk and Wervershoof into the municipality Medemblik.

The new city hall is the former office building of the DSB Bank in Wognum.

== Tourism ==
Medemblik is best known in Europe for its sailing events. Medemblik also has a picturesque small innercity with many 17th and 18th century houses, two big churches, an old orphanage, a town hall and, of course, castle Radboud, which is at the edger of the innercity. The city also hosts the Medemblik steam museum, housed in a decommissioned pumping station.

== Transport ==
A heritage railway connects Medemblik with Hoorn.

== Local government ==
The municipal council of Medemblik consists of 29 seats, which at the 2026 municipal elections divided as follows:

- Hart voor Medemblik - 8 seats
- VVD - 5 seats
- CDA - 4 seats
- Gemeentebelangen - 4 seats
- Morgen! in Medemblik - 3 seats
- Forum for Democracy - 3 seats
- D66 - 2 seats

== Notable people ==
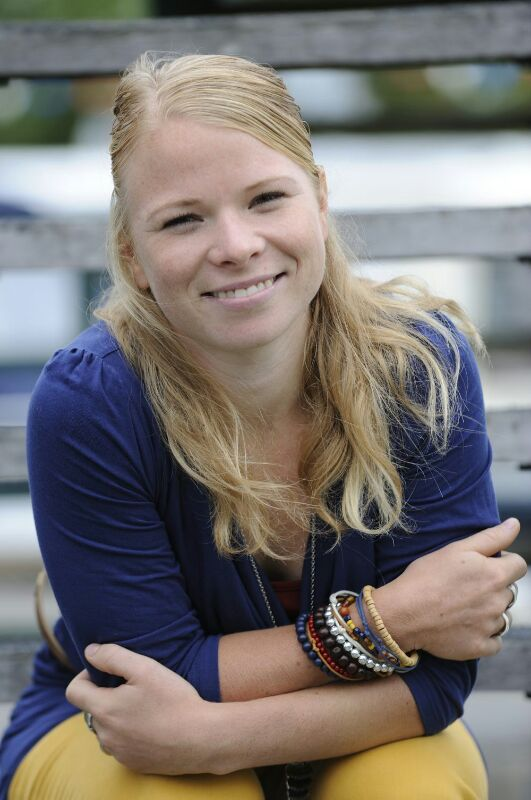
Yvonne Spigt, 2012

- Jan Albertsz Rotius (1624 in Medemblik – 1666) a painter
- A. C. Baantjer (1923 in Urk – 2010) an author of detective fiction and police officer
- Jan Vriend (born 1938 in Benningbroek) a classical music composer, conductor, organist and pianist
- Bep Vriend (born 1946 in Andijk) a bridge player and teacher
- Willem Vogelsang (born 1956 in Medemblik) academic and reserve soldier
- John Appel (born 1958 in Wognum) a documentary filmmaker

=== Sport ===
- Edith van Dijk (born 1973 in Haastrecht) a Dutch swimmer and 6-time world champion.
- Yvonne Spigt (born 1988 in Wervershoof) a marathon skater and inline skater
- Irene Schouten (born 1992 in Andijk) a Dutch speed skater, bronze medallist in the 2018 Winter Olympic Games

== Gallery ==
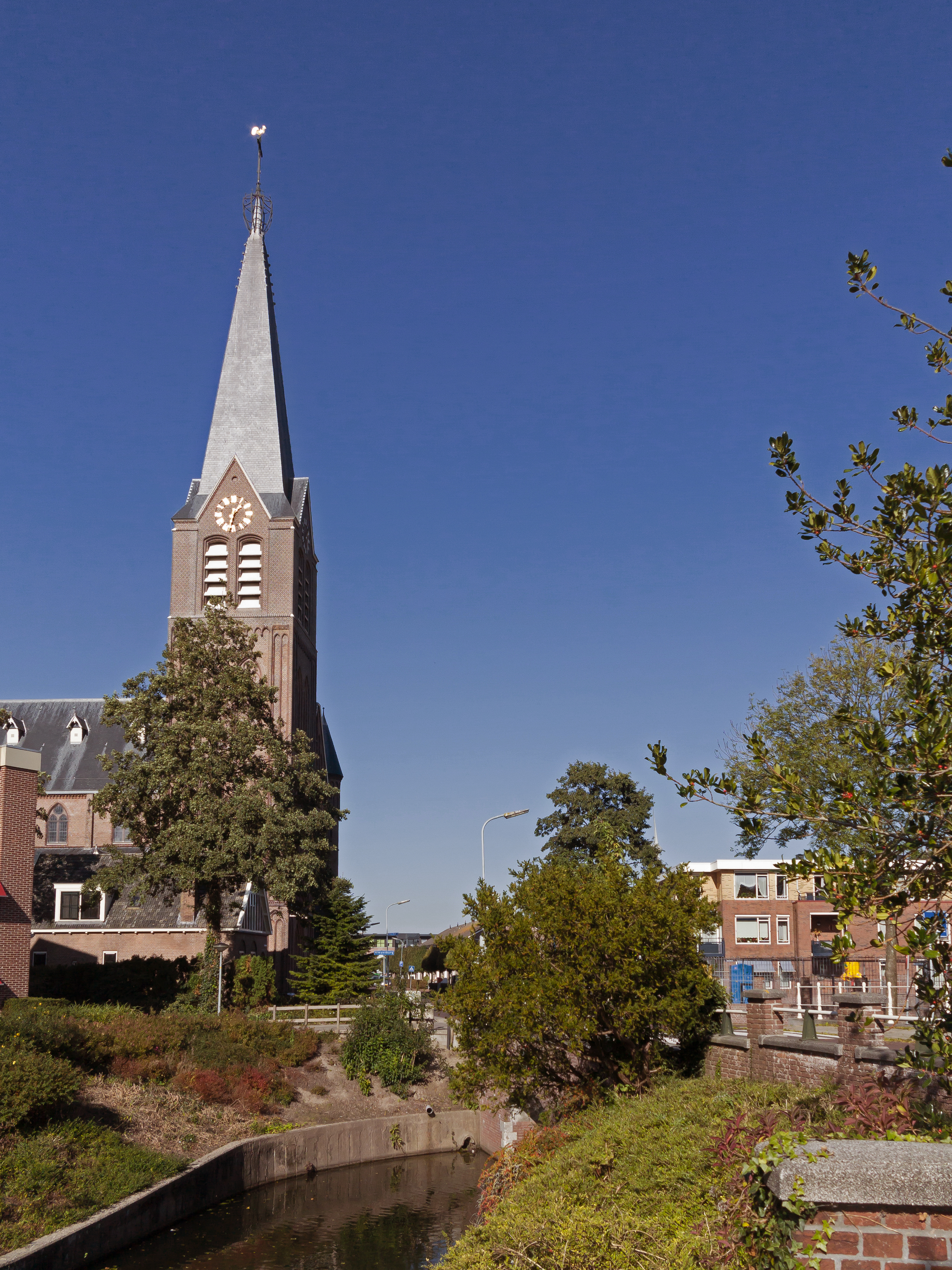
Medemblik, church: de Sint-Martinuskerk

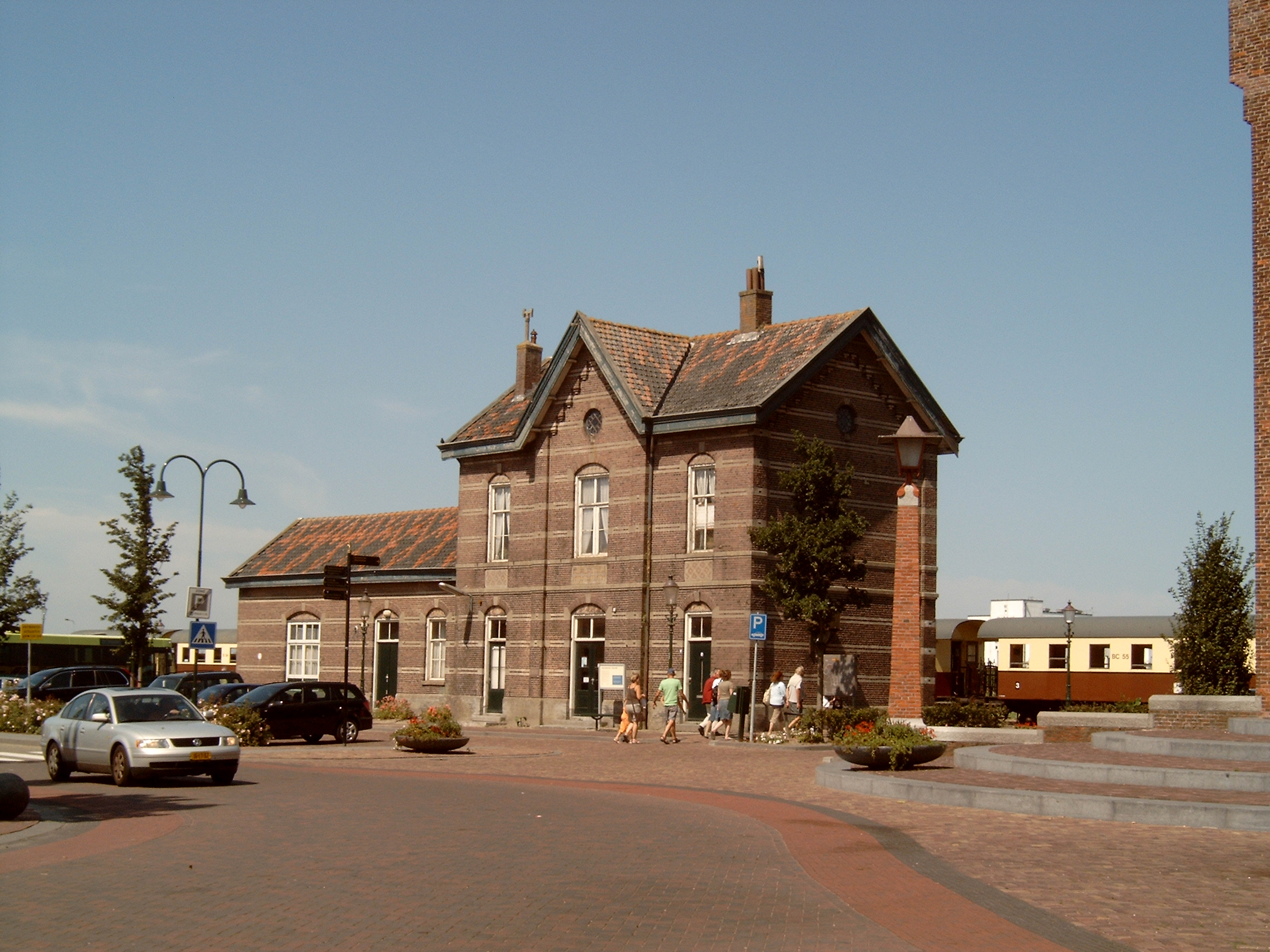
Heritage railway station

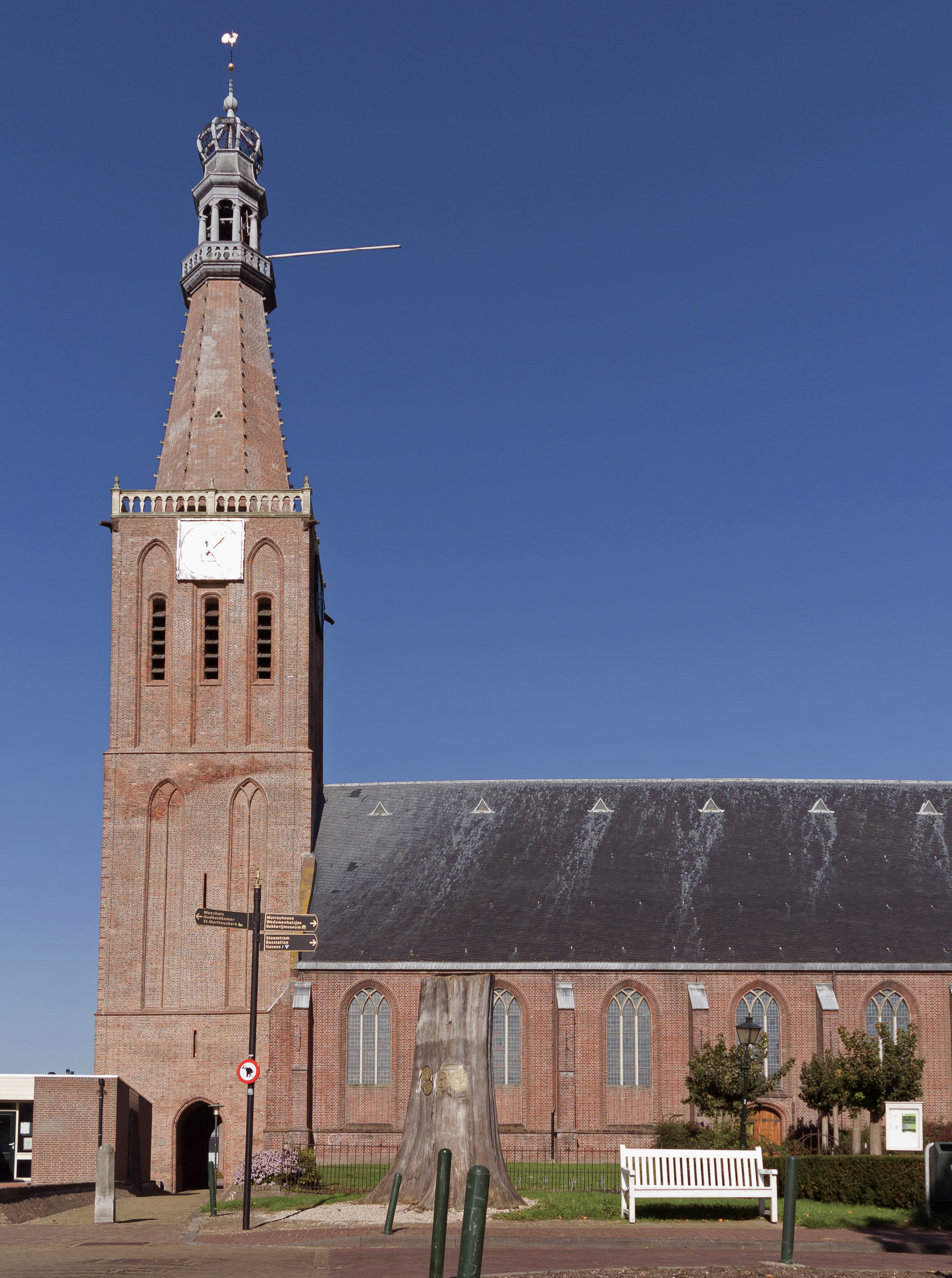
Medemblik, church: Grote of Sint Bonifaciuskerk

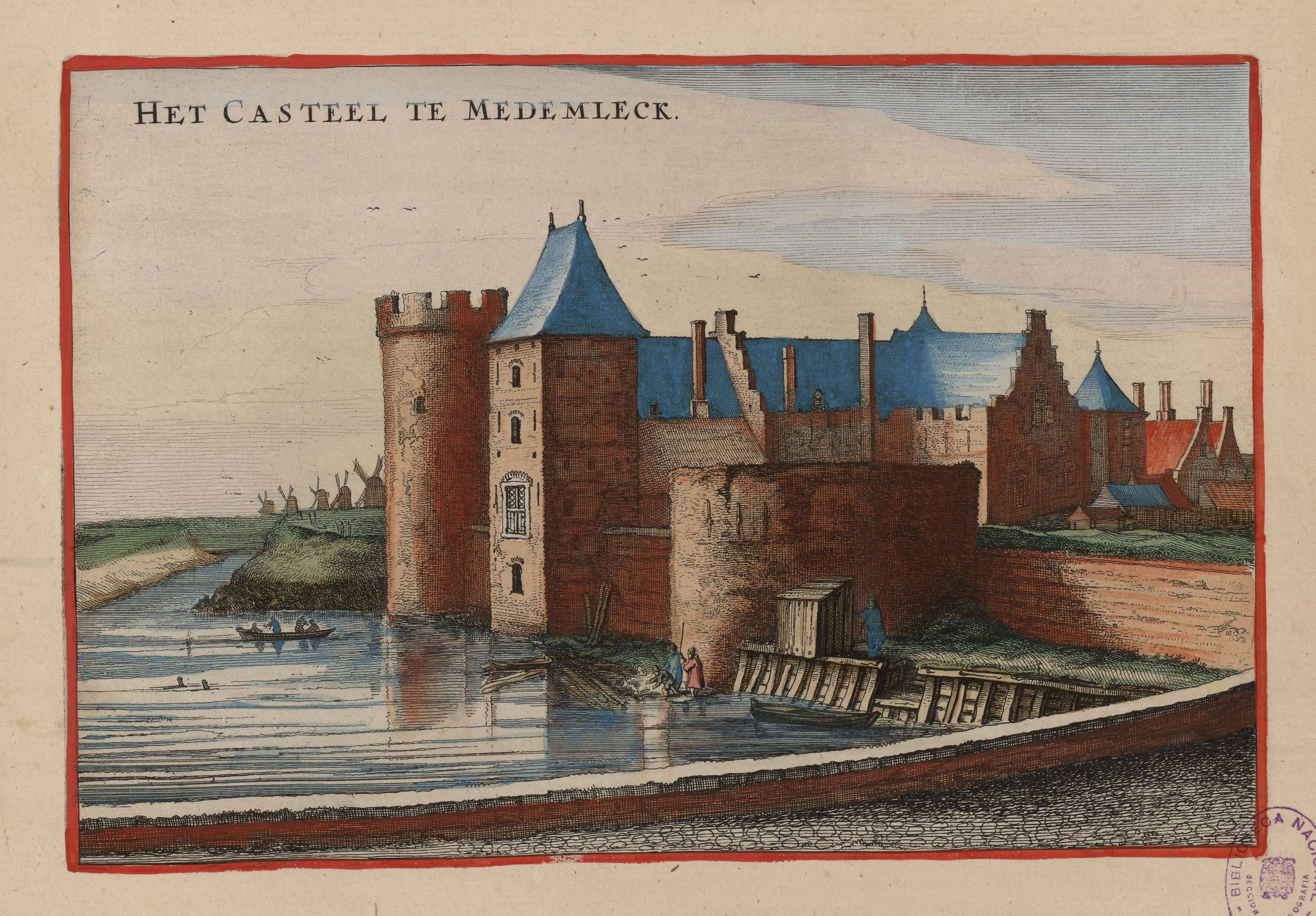
Medemblik Castle in a drawing by Johannes Blaeu

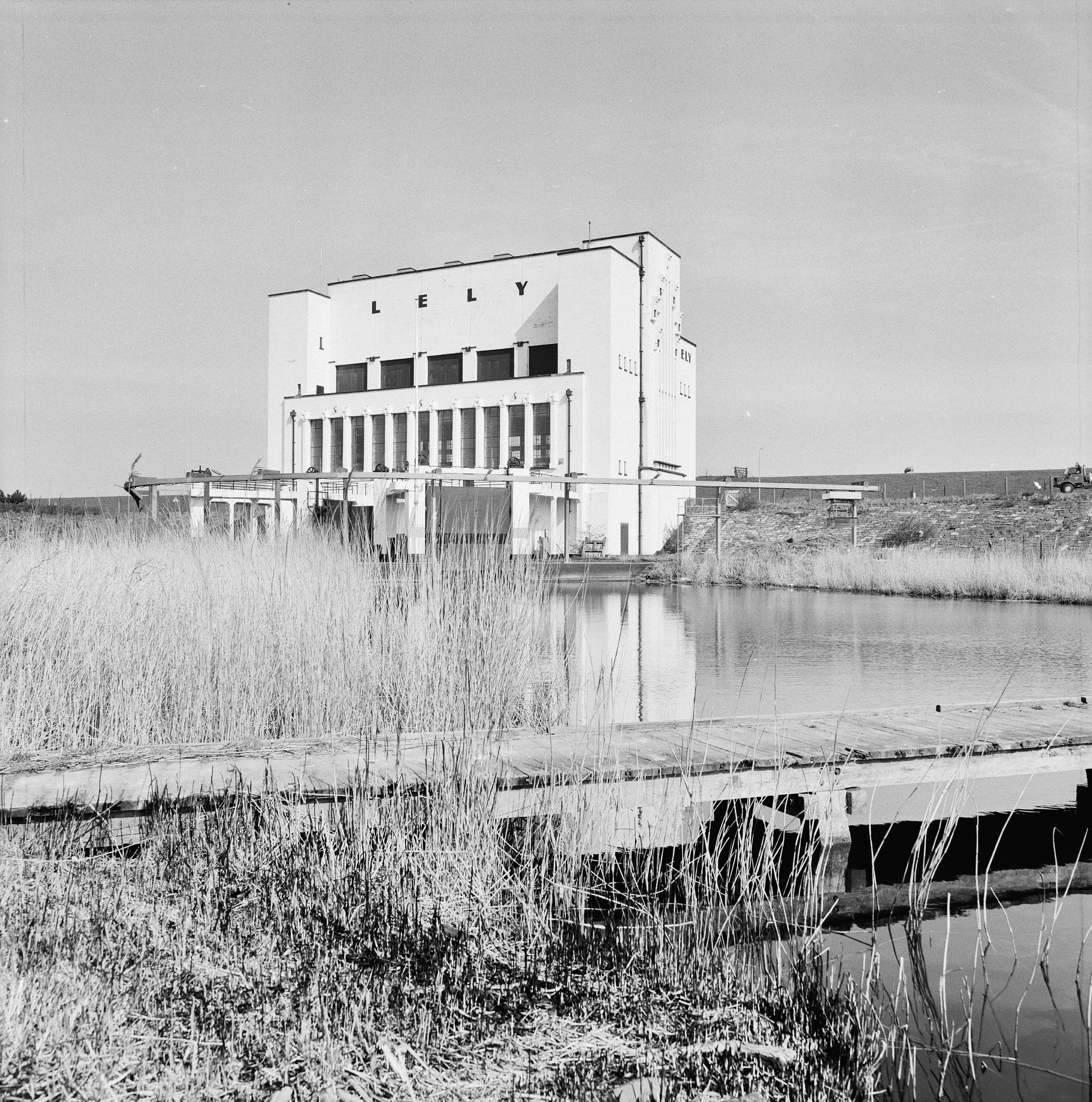
The Lely pumping station, Gemaal Lely
