= List of Gothic brick buildings in the Netherlands =

This list is a part of the international List of Gothic brick buildings. For the parts of this list on the various countries see:

Navigation: BELA • BEL • CZ • DK • ENG • EST • FIN • FRA • GER • HUNG • ITA • LAT • LIT • NL • POL • RUS • SK • SWE • SWI • UKR

– In long tables, vertical arrows link to the navigation boards above (after the preceding table) and below (before the next table). –

Provinces: GRON • FRI • N-HOL • S-HOL • ZEE • N-BRA • UTR • GELD • OV-IJ • DREN • LIMB

== Province of Groningen ==
Background informations:

- RCE = Rijksdienst voor het Cultureel Erfgoed (National Service of Cultural Heritage)
- M-GR = Volume on Groningen Province of Monumenten in Nederland series, graduate download as PDF see Bibliography: Monumenten in Nederland

Ten Boer • Delfzijl • Eemsmond • Groningen • Loppersum • De Marne • Westerwolde • Winsum (Gn.) • Zuidhorn

↕	Place	Building	Time of construction	Notes	Picture
↓	Aduard, Zuidhorn (see also below)	Former hospital	early 14th century	now Protestant village church	
↓	Appingedam	Nicolaïkerk	15th century	predecessor 1225	
↑	Appingedam	house Dijkstraat 24, M-GR p. 68, not a listed monument	14th century		
↓	Bedum	St. Walfriduskerk	brick since 1481	Romanesque tufa building since about 1050, slanting tower	
↓	Beerta, Oldambt	Reformed church	1506–1508		
↑	Ten Boer	Protestant church	13th century	Romano-Gothic, orig. monastic church	
↓	Garmerwolde, Ten Boer	Garmerwolde church	13th century	Romano-Gothic	
↑	Thesinge, Ten Boer	Kloosterkerk	about 1250		
↓	Niekerk, Ten Boer	Protestant church	12th & 13th centuries	originally Romanesque of tufa, enlargements by brick and Gothic	
↑	Godlinze, Delfzijl	Ref. St. Pancrace church	12th–16th centuries	Romano-Gothic	
↓	Holwierde, Delfzijl	Protestant church	11th–14th centuries	Romanesque tufa, Romanesque brick & Gothic brick	
↑	Krewerd, Delfzijl	Protestant church	end 13th century		
↓	Losdorp, Delfzijl	Protestant church	13th century	alterations in 1775	
↑	Meedhuizen, Delfzijl	Protestant church	13th century	alterations about 1700	
↓	Termunten, Delfzijl	Protestant church	2nd half of the 13th century		
↑	Woldendorp, Delfzijl	Protestant church	between 1275 & 1300	originally cross-shaped	
↓	Kantens, Eemsmond	Protestant church	nave about 1200, choir late 13th century		
↑	Oldenzijl, Eemsmond	Protestant church	1st half 13th century	Romanesque with Gothic modernizations	
↓	Oosternieland, Eemsmond	Ref. St. Nicholas church	vaults 13th & 15th century	Romano-Gothic	
↑	Uithuizen, Eemsmond	Ref. St. James church	1st half of the 13th century	tower older, Romanesque	
↓	Zandeweer, Eemsmond	Reformed church	since early 13th century	orig. Romanesque, separate tower early 15th century, western entrance Gothic forms but 17th c., windows later enlarged	
↑	Finsterwolde, Oldambt	Reformed church	1586/1587	very late Gothic; Neoclassical alterations	
↓	Groningen	Der Aa-kerk	13th – 15th centuries		
↑	Groningen	Martinikerk	13th, 15th, 16th century		
↓	Groningen	Prince's Court	1436–1569		
↑	Groningen	Province House	1550	restored about 1900, Brick Gothic wing former St. Martin school	
↓	Groningen	house Brugstraat 24	15th century		
↑	Groningen	Warehouse "Laif & Nuver"	16th century		
↓	Groningen	several originally Gothic private houses that underwent later alterations, here Herestraat 13 and Hinckaertshuis			
↑	Haren	St. Nicholas church	early 13th century		
↓	Noordlaren, Haren	St. Bartholomew church	12th century	Gothic modernizations in the 15th century	
↑	Lettelbert, Leek	Protestant church	13th century	originally Romanesque, changed to Gothic	
↓	Midwolde, Leek	Protestant church	choir 13th century	nave 12th century, Romanesque	
↑	Tolbert, Leek	Protestant church	13th century	Romanesque & Gothic	
↓	Loppersum	Petrus en Pauluskerk	1217–1530		
↑	Eenum, Loppersum	Reformed church	since 12th century	Romanesque with (former) Gothic entrances	
↓	Huizinge, Loppersum	Ref. St. John's church	about 1250	Romanesque (round cupula vaults) & Gothic	
↑	Leermens, Loppersum	Ref. St. Donatus church	since 12th century	Romanesque with Gothic transept and alterations	
↓	Middelstum, Loppersum	Ref. St. Hippolyte church	15th century	cross-shaped	
↑	Stedum, Loppersum	Ref. St. Bartholomew church	13th century		
↓	Westerwijtwerd, Loppersum	Reformed church	13th century	Romano-Gothic	
↑	't Zandt, Loppersum	Ref. St. Mary church, M-GR p. 238	nave 13th (rather Romano-Gothic), choir 15th century		
↓	Zeerijp, Loppersum	Ref. St. James the Elder church	early 14th century	cross-shaped	
↑	Eenrum, De Marne	Reformed church, M-GR p. 83	nave end 13th c.; tower 1646–1652	Romano-Gothic	
↑	Leens, De Marne	Reformed church, B-GR p. 151/152	nave & northern transept 11th century tufa, with gothic windows of brick; choir & southern transept (12th c.) and tower (13th c. & 1863) all of brick		
↓	Mensingeweer, De Marne	St Michael church	13th century	nave since 1842 plastered	
↑	Westernieland, De Marne	Reformed church	tower 14th century		
↓	Pieterburen, De Marne	Ref. St. Peter's church	1st half of the 15th century		
↑	Onstwedde, Stadskanaal	Ref. St Nicholas church		mainly Romanesque, one Gothic door	
↓	Bellingwolde, Westerwolde	Ref. Magnuskerk	1527		
↑	Sellingen, Westerwolde	Reformed church	about 1300		
↓	Vlagtwedde, Westerwolde	Reformed church	13th century	plastered since 20th century	
↑	Wedde, Westerwolde	Reformed church	11th century		
↓	Winschoten	Marktpleinkerk (Market Church)	13th – 15th centuries	Romano-Gothic	
↑	Winsum (Gn.)	Torenkerk (Tower Church)	12th century, gothified in the 16th century	tower 1693	
↓	Den Andel, Winsum	Reformed church	13th century	Romano-Gothic	
↑	Baflo, Winsum	Ref. St. Lawrence church	since about 1211	begun by tufa, then Romanesque brick, then Gothic brick, tower tall since about 1500	
↓	Ezinge, Winsum	Reformed church	13th century	Romanesque & Gothic	
↑	Obergum, Winsum	Reformed church	13th & 14th century		
↓	Oostum, Winsum	Reformed church	mid 13th & 14th century		
↑	Fransum; Zuidhorn	Reformed church	early 13th and 16th century	Romanesque and altered nave, Gothic choir	
↑	Niehove, Zuidhorn	Niehove church	13th century	nowadays secular use	
↑	Noordhorn, Zuidhorn	Reformed church	about 1280	Romanesque & Gothic; tower 1765	
↑	Oldehove, Zuidhorn	Ludgerus church	13th century	Romanesque & Gothic	

Prov. of Groningen ⬆ : Ten Boer • Delfzijl • Eemsmond • Groningen • Loppersum • De Marne • Westerwolde • Winsum (Gn.) • Zuidhorn

NL provinces: GRON • FRI • N-HOL • S-HOL • ZEE • N-BRA • UTR • GELD • OV-IJ • DREN • LIMB

== Friesland ==
Background informations:

- RCE = Rijksdienst voor het Cultureel Erfgoed (National Service of Cultural Heritage)
- M-FR = Volume on the province of Friesland of Monumenten in Nederland series, graduate download as PDF see Bibliography: Monumenten in Nederland

Achtkarspelen • Dongeradeel • Ferweradeel • Leeuwarden • Sneek/Súdwest-Fryslân

↕	Place	Building	Time of construction	Notes	Picture
↓	Augustinusga, Achtkarspelen	Ref. St. Augustine church	15th century		
↓	Buitenpost, Achtkarspelen	Protestant church	15th century	tower 12th & 16th centuries	
↑	Droegeham, Achtkarspelen	Protestant church	13th century, nave 1876	Romanesque & Neo-Romanesque	
↓	Surhuizum, Achtkarspelen	Ref. St. Anthony church	tower about 1300, nave 1641	early Gothic and After-Gothic	
↓	Twijzel, Achtkarspelen	Ref. St. Peter's church	tower 13th century	nave 17th century; Romano-Gothic & After Gothic	
↑	Damwâld, Dantumadiel	Ref. St. Benedict's church	12th century	Gothic alterations	
↓	Damwâld, Dantumadiel	Ref. St. Boniface church	1200	Gothic choir	
↑	Rinsumageast, Dantumadiel	Ref. St. Alexander church	11th, 12th, 16th century	Romanesque tufa, Gothic brick	
↓	Sijbrandahuis, Dantumadiel	"Monastery chapel", M-FR p. 262	about 1300		
↑	Aalsum, Dongeradeel	Protestant church	12th & 13th century & 1500	Romanesque with Gothic additions	
↓	Anjum, Dongeradeel	Ref. St. Michael church	brick 13th century		
↑	Bornwird, Dongeradeel	Ref. St. Mary church	13th century	Romanesque & Gothic	
↓	Brantgum, Dongeradeel	Church of Brantgum	12th & 16th century	Romanesque tufa and Gothic brick	
↑	Dokkum, Dongeradeel	St. Martin church	1590	Gothic & Renaissance	
↓	Ee, Dongeradeel	Church of Ee (St. Gangulfus)	13th century	Romanesque & Gothic	
↑	Hantum, Dongeradeel	Ref. St. Nicholas church	12th & 16th century	tufa & brick, Romanesque & Gothic	
↓	Hantumhuizen, Dongeradeel	Ref. St. Anne church	13th century	Romanesque & Gothic	
↑	Jouswier, Dongeradeel	Ref. St. Peter's church	1557		
↓	Lioessens, Dongeradeel	Protestant church	13th century	Gothic windows 1480	
↑	Morra, Dongeradeel	St. John's church	2nd half 13th century		
↓	Nes, Dongeradeel	St. John's church	12th & 13th century		
↑	Oosternijkerk, Dongeradeel	Ref. St. Cecilia church	13th & 15th/16th century		
↓	Oostrum, Dongeradeel	Ref. St. Nicholas church	nave 16th century	inside most interesting frescos	
↑	Paesens, Dongeradeel	Ref. St. Anthony church	1200 ff.	orig. Romanesque; Gothic and later alterations	
↓	Ternaard, Dongeradeel	Great church	mid 16th century	very late Gothic	
↑	Waaxens, Dongeradeel	Ref. St. Thomas church	about 1400	small areas of tufa	
↓	Wetsens, Dongeradeel	Ref. St. Vitus church	12th & 16th century	brick & tufa	
↑	Wierum, Dongeradeel	Ref. St. Mary church	tower 1200 ff., nave 1912	western gable old	
↑	Ferwerd, Ferwerderadiel	St. Martin church	15th/16th century		
↓	Blije, Ferwerderadiel	St. Nicholas church	early 16th century	tower 13th century	
↓	Genum, Ferwerderadiel	Church of Genum	12th–15th century	Romanesque tower and Gothic southern wall & choir of brick	
↑	Hallum, Ferwerderadiel	Great St. Martin church	13th–15th century	Romanesque & Gothic	
↓	Hogebeintum, Ferwerderadiel	Village church	brick 16th century	tufa building of 11th/12th centuries, western part of the nave and gothic windows of brick	
↑	Janum, Ferwerderadiel	Church of Janum	13th century	Romano-Gothic with later Gothic alterations	
↓	Lichtaard, Ferwerderadiel	Ref. St. Peter's church	mid 16th century		
↑	Marrum, Ferwerderadiel	Ref. St. Godehard church	brick 13th century	Romano-Gothic; post-medieval alterations	
↓	Wanswerd, Ferwerderadiel	Ref. St. Peter's church	16th century		
↑	Westernijkerk, Ferwerderadiel	Ref. St. Oswald church	13th & 15th century		
↓	Joure, De Fryske Marren	Westermeer Church tower	14th century	church demolished in the 18th century	
↑	Nijemirdum, De Fryske Marren	Nijemirdum church tower	14th & 15th century	church demolished in the 18th century	
↓	Nieuweschoot, Heerenveen	Reformed church	15th century	17th century alterations	
↑	Katlijk, Heerenveen	Ref. St. Thomas church	1525		
↓	Kollum, Kollumerland en Nieuwkruisland	Maartenskerk	15th century		
↑	Kollumerzwaag, Kollumerland en Nieuwkruisland	Reformed church	12th/15th/16th century		
↓	Westergeest, Kollumerland en Nieuwkruisland	Reformed church	13th century	Romanesque & Gothic, little rests of tufa from the predecessor	
↑	Oudwoude, Kollumerland en Nieuwkruisland	Church of Oudwoude	15th century		
↓	Leeuwarden	Grote or Jacobijnerkerk	1275–1310		
↑	Leeuwarden	Oldehove (tower)	1529–1533	unfinished tower of (later demolished) St. Vitus church	
↓	Bears, Leeuwarden	Protestant church of Bears	13th, 14th 15th century		
↑	Easterlittens, Leeuwarden	Ref. St. Margaret church	12th/13th century	windows 15th century	
↓	Finkum, Leeuwarden	Ref. St. Vitus church	13th–16th century	Romanesque with Gothic modernizations	
↑	Goutum, Leeuwarden	Protestant church of Goutum	brick 15th century	in the 11th century a Romanesque tufa building	
↓	Grou, Leeuwarden	Protestant church of Grou	13th–15th century	tufa & brick, Romanesque & Gothic	
↑	Hijum, Leeuwarden	Prot. St-Nicholas church	12th century tufa	Gothic alerations by brick in the 15th century	
↓	Hijlaard, Leeuwarden	Johanneskerk	13th century	Gothic windows 15th/16th century	
↑	Huizum, Leeuwarden	Protestant church	13th century	nave nowadays plastered, tower of visible brick, renovated in 1655	
↓	Idaard, Leeuwarden	Ref. St. Gertrude church	tower 15th century	nave 1774	
↑	Jelsum, Leeuwarden	Protestant church	12th/13th century		
↓	Miedum, Leeuwarden	Miedum church tower	14th century	church demolished in 1834	
↑	Roordahuizum, Leeuwarden	Vincentine church	15th century	alterations in 1726 & 1878	
↓	Schillaard, Leeuwarden	Schillaard church tower	1567	church demolished in 1880	
↑	Stiens, Leeuwarden	St. Vitus church	12th/13th/16th century	tower Gothic; further alterations 19th century	
↓	Swichum, Leeuwarden	Prot. St. Nicholas church	13th century		
↑	Wirdum, Friesland, Leeuwarden	St. Martin church	nave 13th century	replacing a tuff building of 12th century; later alterations	
↓	Oldeberkoop, Ooststellingwerf	Ref. St. Bonifatius church	12th & 14th century	primarily Romanesque of tufa, choir gothic with a lot of brick	
↑	Olterterp, Opsterland	Ref. St. Hippolyte church	about 1500		
↑	Ureterp, Opsterland	Ref. St. Peter's church, M-FR p. 298	tower 13th century	tower Romanesque & Gothic, nave new	
↓	Wijnjewoude, Opsterland	Church of Duurswoude	15th century	monastic bricks, reparations by yellow brick	
↑	Kortehemmen, Smallingerland	Protestant church	about 1300		
↓	Oudega, Smallingerland	Protestant St. Agatha church	12th–14th century	Romano-Gothic tufa church with a (former) Gothic brick entrance	
↑	Sneek, Súdwest-Fryslân	Grote or Martinikerk	1300, 1498		
↓	Kimswerd, Súdwest-Fryslân	Ref. St. Lawrence church	choir 13th century	tower of tufa, nave 11th/12th century, southern side pale yellow brick, Renaissance (?), northern side various kinds of brick	
↑	Longerhouw, Súdwest-Fryslân	Protestant church	tower 13th century	nave replaced in 1757	
↓	Lutkewierum, Súdwest-Fryslân	St. Gertrude church	tower 15th century, nave 1557	nave of yellow brick	
↑	with proviso: Makkum	Doniakerk	1660	After Gothic	
↓	Nijland, Súdwest-Fryslân	St. Nicholas church	16th century	Gothic & Renaissance, yellow brick	
↑	Oosterwierum, Súdwest-Fryslân	Oosterwierum church tower	13/14th century	Romanesque & Gothic, church demolished in 1905	
↓	Parrega, Súdwest-Fryslân	Ref. St. John's church	13th century	windows later enlarged, nave yellow brick, tower red brick	
↑	Pingjum, Súdwest-Fryslân	Victoriuskerk	1200, 1500	height of the nave enlarged; yellow and red brick	
↓	Schraard, Súdwest-Fryslân	Protestant church	13th century	round choir but pointed arch windows of the nave	
↑	Terzool, Súdwest-Fryslân	Protestant church	tower 14th, nave 15th century	nave altered in 1838	
↓	Tjerkwerd, Súdwest-Fryslân	Ref. St. Peter's church	14th century	originally longer	
↑	Westhem, Súdwest-Fryslân	Ref. Bartholomeüskerk in Feytebuorren	tower 13th/14th century	nave 1708	
↑	Wieuwerd, Súdwest-Fryslân	Ref. Nicolaaskerk	12th/13th century	northern windows 14th century, tower new	
↑	Wommels, Súdwest-Fryslân	Ref. Jacobikerk	13th century & 1508	yellow brick	
↑	Workum, Súdwest-Fryslân	Grote or Sint-Gertrudiskerk	1480–1560		

Friesland ⬆ : Achtkarspelen • Dongeradeel • Ferweradeel • Leeuwarden • Sneek/Súdwest-Fryslân

NL provinces: GRON • FRI • N-HOL • S-HOL • ZEE • N-BRA • UTR • GELD • OV-IJ • DREN • LIMB

== North Holland ==
Background informations:

- RCE = Rijksdienst voor het Cultureel Erfgoed (National Service of Cultural Heritage)
- M-NH = Volume on North Holland of Monumenten in Nederland series, graduate download as PDF see Bibliography: Monumenten in Nederland

Alkmaar • Amsterdam • Drechterland • Eedam-Volendam • Haarlem • Medemblik

↕	Place	Building	Time of construction	Notes	Picture
↓	Alkmaar	Town hall	1509–1520	many elements of Brabantine Gothic	
↓	Alkmaar	Grote or Sint-Laurenskerk	1470–1518	gable of the transept decorated by Brabantine Gothic	
↓	Alkmaar	Kapelkerk (Chapel Church)	1475-1536	alternating layers of brick and layers of stone	
↓	Alkmaar	Waag (scales building)	14th centuries	relics of the former Holy Ghost Chapel: lower section of the tower, western section of the nave; Renaissance parts 1597–1603	
↑	De Rijp, Alkmaar	Grote Kerk	1529		
↓	Amsterdam	Oude Kerk; M-NH p. 110–112		brick and stone	
↑	Amsterdam	Agnietenkapel			
↓	Amsterdam	Nieuwe Kerk; M-NH p. 112–114		brick: western nave and other parts	
↑	Bergen, North Holland	Ruin church	since 1422	1574 destroyed in Eighty Years' War (by Dutch troops), choir rebuilt in 1597	
↓	Beverwijk	Grote Kerk	14th century & 1592–1648	rebuilt after destruction of Eighty Years' War	
↑	Blaricum	Village church	nave about 1400, tower 1500	rebuilt after fire of 1696	
↓	Broek in Waterland	Reformed St-Nicholas Church	15th century	hall church with two naves, restored in 1585 and 1639 after fires	
↑	Castricum	Village church	11th century	part of the nave of tufa	
↓	Binnenwijzend, Drechterland	Village church	15th century?	reconstruction after village fire of 1911	
↑	Hem, Drechterland	Old church tower	about 1500		
↓	Oosterblokker, Drechterland	Ref. St. Pancrace church	15th century		
↑	Westerblokker, Drechterland	Tower of the village church	1st half of the 16th century		
↓	Schellinkhout, Drechterland	Ref. St. Martin church	14th–16th century		
↑	Venhuizen, Drechterland	Protestant church	15th–16th century	nowadays both religious and secular use; tower 1875	
↓	Wijdenes, Drechterland	Protestant church	choir 15th century	rest newer	
↑	Edam, Edam-Volendam	Grote or Sint-Nicolaaskerk	15th century		
↓	Edam, Edam-Volendam	Speeltoren (Play tower)	1310 to 1764	Relic of Our Lady's church	
↑	Beets, Edam-Volendam	Protestant church	15th century		
↓	Oosthuizen, Edam-Volendam	Grote or Sint-Nicolaaskerk	1511–1518		
↓	Egmond aan den Hoef	Castle chapel	1431 & 1633	rebuilt after destruction in the Eighty Years' War	
↑	Enkhuizen	Westerkerk		partly belts of stone	
↓	Enkhuizen	Zuiderkerk		partly belts of stone	
↑	Haarlem	Grote or St.-Bavokerk, M-NH p. 313–315	1370–1520	only aisles and lower part of the transept walls of brick	
↓	Haarlem	City Hall	14th century	Renaissance/Baroque additions in 17th century; tower restored in 20th century	
↑	Haarlem	Janskerk, M-NH p. 315	1310–1318	Knights of Malta	
↓	Haarlem	Waalse Kerk, M-NH p. 315	1348		
↑	Haarlem	Huis ter Kleef	13th century	mainly in ruins	
↓	Haarlem	Amsterdamse Poort	1355		
↑	Heemskerk, Midden-Kennemerland	Village church	1st half of the 15th century	tower of kloostermoppen (monastery brick), nave rebuilt using more red brick in 17th century	
↓	Hilversum	Tower of the Grote Kerk	1481		
↑	Hoorn	Noorderkerk	1441–1519	hall church	
↓	Zwaag, Hoorn	Ref. St. Martin church	15th century		
↑	Broek op Langedijk, Langedijk	Church of Broek op Langedijk	15th/16th century		
↓	Oudkarspel, Langedijk	Allemanskerk	tower 13th, nave 15th century	1970 after fire reconstruction without historicist alterations	
↑	Sint Pancras, Langedijk	Reformed church	15th century		
↓	Laren	Johanneskerk	about 1500		
↑	Medemblik	Radboud Castle	1288		
↓	Medemblik	Grote or Sint-Bonifaciuskerk	1404	1555 rebuilt after a fire	
↑	Abbekerk, Medemblik	Abbekerk	15th century	nave nowadays plastered	
↓	Lambertschaag, Medemblik	St. Lambert's church	1490–1500	now insecular use	
↑	Opperdoes, Medemblik	Reformed church M-NH p. 456	tower 15th century, nave 1525–1530		
↓	Sijbekarspel, Medemblik	Reformed church	finished in 1547		
↑	Twisk, Medemblik	Prot. (Hervormde) church M-NH p. 499	1395/1500		
↓	Wognum, Medemblik	Protestant church	15th century		
↑	Monnickendam, Waterland	Grote or Sint-Nicolaaskerk	15th century–1644		
↓	Muiderberg, Muiden	Church at the Sea	15th century	after fire in 1630 rebuilt about 1680	
↑	Naarden, Gooise Meren	Grote or Sint-Vituskerk	1455–1518	construction interrupted by two fires	
↓	Aartswoud, Opmeer	Reformed church	tower 16th century	nave 1883–1884	
↑	Wadway, Opmeer	Theaterkerk	1450 (tower)–early 16th century (western nave)		
↓	Valkkoog, Schagen	Reformed church	16th century	heavy 19th century alterations	
↑	Warmenhuizen, Schagen	Old St. Ursula church	13th to 15th century	several phases/enlargements, 15th century by pale brick	
↓	Den Burg, Texel	Protestant church of Den Burg	since 1452		
↑	Uitgeest, Kennemerland	Church of Uitgeest	nave 15th, tower 14th century		
↓	Velsen-Zuid, Velsen	Engelmunduskerk	brick 13th century	begun by tufa in the 12th century	
↑	Weesp	Grote or Sint-Laurenskerk	1429–1462		
↓	Kortenhoef, Wijdemeren	Reformed church	end 15th century	choir and tower Gothic, nave altered	
↑	Nederhorst den Berg, Wijdemeren	Willibrorduskerk/Church on the hill	Gothic about 1500	Romanesque parts of the 12th century	
↑	Nieuw-Loosdrecht, Wijdemeren	Sijpekerk	1400–1450	hall church	
↑	Wijk aan Zee, Beverwijk	Village church	15th century	torso of an originally cross-shaped church	

North Holland ⬆ : Alkmaar • Amsterdam • Drechterland • Eedam-Volendam • Haarlem • Medemblik

NL provinces: GRON • FRI • N-HOL • S-HOL • ZEE • N-BRA • UTR • GELD • OV-IJ • DREN • LIMB

== South Holland ==
Background informations:

- RCE = Rijksdienst voor het Cultureel Erfgoed (National Service for the Cultural Heritage)
- M-ZH = Volume on Zuid-Holland (South Holland) of Monumenten in Nederland series, graduate download as PDF see Bibliography: Monumenten in Nederland

Brielle • Delft • Giessenlanden • Goeree-Overflakkee • Gouda • The Hague • Krimpenerwaard • Leiden • Molenwaard • Nissewward • Zederik

↕	Place	Building	Time of construction	Notes	Picture
↓	Alblasserdam, southeast of Rotterdam center	Tower of the former reformed church	15th century		
↓	Koudekerk aan den Rijn, Alphen aan den Rijn	Protestant church	1400–1511		
↓	Zwammerdam, Alphen aan den Rijn	Protestant church		restored in 1672	
↓	Barendrecht	Protestant church	1st fourth 16th century	western gable newer	
↑	Heinenoord, Binnenmaas	Protestant church, M-ZH S. 266 f.	mid 15th century	pale brick	
↓	Mijnsheerenland, Binnenmaas	Protestant church	about 1500		
↑	Bodegraven, Bodegraven-Reeuwijk	Protestant church	restored 1672	Late Gothic	
↓	Waarder, Bodegraven-Reeuwijk	Protestant church	about 1500	northern transept about 1540	
↑	Brielle	Beguinage chapel	15th century	whitewashed brick	
↓	Brielle	Grote or Sint-Catharijnekerk	begun 1462	walls of the nave mainly of brick, western bays and a lot of masonry of stone	
↑	Brielle	Ref. St. Jacobs of Kleine Kerk	late 15th century		
↓	Brielle	two houses Voorstraat 27	15th century	restored in 1933	
↑	Zwartewaal, Brielle	Protestant church	15th century	tower 1597	
↓	Capelle aan den IJssel	Protestant church	15th century	restorations (esp. tower) 1592 & 1664/1665	
↑	Delft	Oude Kerk	1246	slanting tower	
↓	Delft	Nieuwe Kerk	1353	upper storeys of the tower in tuff, clerestory of the choir mixed	
	Delft	Prinsenhof, former St Agatha monastery	1403	comprising the 3rd largest church of Delft	
↑	Delft	Saint Hippolytus Chapel	1400		
↓	Delft	Lutherse Kerk, also known as St. George's Chapel	2nd half of the 15th century		
↑	Delft	St-Barbara Monastery	1405		
↓	Delft	Beguinage		Gothic portal, most buildings newer	
↑	Delft	Private house 104 Molslaan	about 1500		
↓	Delft	Eastern Gate	1400 & 16th century		
↑	Delft	St-Hubert's Tower	1st quarter of 16th century		
↓	Dordrecht	Grote Kerk	until 1470		
↑	Giessen-Oudekerk, Giessenlanden	Protestant church, Oudkerkseweg	15th century		
↓	Giessenburg, Giessenlanden	Protestant church, Kerkweg	15th century		
↑	Hoornaar, Giessenlanden	Protestant church	15th century		
↓	Noordeloos, Giessenlanden	Protestant church	15th century	alterations of the windows in 1877	
↑	Goedereede, Goeree-Overflakkee	separate tower of the Protestant church	15th century	belts and masonry of stone	
↓	Goedereede, Goeree-Overflakkee	Northern chapel beside the Protestant church	15th century		
↑	Dirksland, Goeree-Overflakkee	Protestant church		Late Gothic pseudo-basilica	
↓	Middelharnis , Goeree-Overflakkee	Grote Kerk	15th century	barrel vaults	
↑	Oude-Tonge, Goeree-Overflakkee	Protestant church	15th century?		
↓	Stad aan 't Haringvliet, Goeree-Overflakkee	Protestant church	2nd fourth 16th century	various restorations	
↑	Gorinchem, east of Rotterdam	Holy Ghost chapel	early 15th century	1522 tower added	
↓	Gouda	Sint Janskerk		only parts of brick	
↑	Gouda	former Agnietenkapel	about 1450	17th century alterations	
↓	Gouda	House Groeneweg (former Alexian monastery)	15th century	altered being a Latin school in 1666	
↑	Gouda	Barbara tower	16th century	relic of a former hospital church; restored in 1635	
↓	Gouda	Lady's tower, RCE 16958	1493	relic of the chapel of the Rosary Brotherhood (demolished in 1585), loss of Gothic arches (probably 17th century)	
↑	Gouda	Lutheran church (former Sint-Joostkapel)	about 1425	1869 Gothic Revival alterations, 1957 reconstruction of the medieval state	
↓	Gouda	Jerusalem chapel	mid 16th century		
↑	Gouda	Tolhuis (Toll house)	15th century (or older)	later additions, nowadays painted but visible brick structure	
↓	The Hague	Grote Kerk, The Hague	14th century		
↑	The Hague	Kloosterkerk	c. 1400 & early 16th century		
↓	The Hague	Ridderzaal	1256–1296	Early Gothic	
↑	The Hague	Gevangenpoort, M-ZH p. 212	core about 1370	later additions	
↓	Hellevoetsluis, on Voorne-Putten	Protestant church	about 1500	yellow brick	
↑	Hendrik-Ido-Ambacht, near Rotterdam	Protestant church	tower 14th century	Late Gothic; 19th century enlargement	
↓	Hillegom, near Haarlem NH	Protestant Maartenskerk	tower 15th, choir 16th century	nave 1926	
↑	Katwijk aan den Rijn, near mouth of Oude Rijn	Protestant church	since 1300, nave 15th century		
↑	Rijnsburg, Katwijk aan den Rijn	Protestant church	tower of tufa, 12th century		
↓	Klaaswaal, Cromstrijen	Protestant church	begun 1566	very late Gothic	
↑	Bergambacht, Krimpenerwaard	tower of Protestant church	early 16th century	nave no more medieval	
↓	Haastrech, Krimpenerwaard	Protestant church	15th century	lower part of the tower 13th century, some parts 19th century	
↑	Ouderkerk aan den IJssel, Krimpenerwaard	Reformed church	mainly after 1428		
↓	Schoonhoven, Krimpenerwaard	Grote or Bartholomeüskerk	14th–16th century		
↑	Stolwijk, Krimpenerwaard	Protestant church	tower 1501	nave 1947	
↓	Bleiswijk, Lansingerland	Protestant church	1st half of the 15th century	choir of red brick, nave altered in 1668	
↑	Leerdam	Grote Kerk	about 1500		
↓	Leiden	Academiegebouw	1450, 1516 & further		
↑	Leiden	Hooglandse Kerk	1377–1535	only aisles of brick; footplan of a Greek Cross	
↓	Leiden	Pieterskerk	Late Gothic		
↑	Leiden	Elizabeth Hospital	hall of the sick and chapel 15th century, adjacent houses of the poor in Elizabeth court (Elisabethhofje) 16th & 17th century		
↓	Leiderdorp	with proviso: Protestant church	1620	very late Gothic	
↑	Voorburg, Leidschendam-Voorburg	Protestant Oude Kerk	tower 14th, choir 15th century		
↓	Maasland, Midden-Delfland	Protestant Oude Kerk	15th century		
↑	Schipluiden, Midden-Delfland	Protestant church	1st half of the 16th century	almost polychrome yellow brick	
↓	't Woudt, Midden-Delfland	Protestant church	14th & 16th century		
↑	Goudriaan, Molenwaard	Protestant church	15th century	later parts demolished	
↓	Groot-Ammers, Molenwaard	Protestant church	about 1500	belts of various kinds of stone; nave altered	
↑	Langerak, Molenwaard	Protestant church	choir poss. 14th century, nave 16th century		
↓	Molenaarsgraaf, Molenwaard	Protestant church		Late Gothic	
↑	Nieuwpoort, Molenwaard	Protestant church	early 16th century	western façade altered later	
↓	Streefkerk, Molenwaard	Protestant church	about 1500		
↑	Wijngaarden, Molenwaard	Protestant church	15th century & later	four bays of an originally larger church	
↓	Abbenbroek, Nissewaard	Ned. Herv. Kerk (St. Egidius), M-ZH S. 71	1491, choir 1300	choir one of the earliest examples of Brick Gothic in South Holland	
↑	Geervliet, Nissewaard	Protestant church of Our Lady	(1307–) 15th century		
↓	Heenvliet, Nissewaard	Protestant church	14th century		
↓	Heenvliet, Nissewaard	Ravesteyn Castle, M-ZH S. 264	13th–15th centuries	destroyed in 1572	
↑	Spijkenisse, Nissewaard	Protestant church	15th century		
↓	Zuidland, Nissewaard	Protestant church	early 16th century		
↑	Noordwijk, north of mouth of Oude Rijn	Old Hieronymus church	mid 15th century	brick and some blocks of sandstone	
↓	Nootdorp, Pijnacker-Nootdorp	Protestant church	early 16th century		
↑	Oudewater	Grote or St-Michaëlskerk	15th century		
↓	Poortugaal, Albrandswaard	Grote Kerk	14th/15th century		
↑	Ridderkerk, southeast of Rotterdam center	Protestant church	2nd half of the 15th century		
↓	Rijnsaterwoude, Kaag en Braassem, northeast of Leiden	Protestant Woudse Domkerk	tower & choir about 1500	nave 17th century	
↑	Rijswijk, west of Leiden	Oude Kerk	15th century		
↓	Rotterdam	Grote or Sint-Laurenskerk	tower 1449–1525	nave & tower Late Gothic	
↓	Rotterdam	Huis ten Berghe (House at the Hill)	13th century	nowadays ruins	
↑	Schiedam, northwest of Rotterdam center	Grote or Sint-Janskerk	14th & 15th century		
↓	Schiedam, northwest of Rotterdam center	Te Riviere Castle	13th century	now in ruins	
↑	Strijen, Hoeksche Waard, south of Rotterdam	Protestant church (St. Lambert)	15th/16th century		
↓	Sassenheim, Teylingen	Protestant church	Gothic 14/15th century	tower Gothic & of brick	
↑	Warmond, Teylingen	Ruin church	end 15th century		
↓	Naaldwijk, Westland, north of Hook of Holland	Oude Kerk	tower mid 13th century, nave ... and 1472	tower one of the oldest Brick Gothic buildings in South Holland, nave after destruction by a fire rebuilt higher	
↑	Wateringen, Westland	Protestant church	about 1450		
↓	Ameide, Zederik, south side of Lek river	Protestant church	15th century	tower: base older, top newer	
↑	Hei- en Boeicop, Zederik	Protestant church	nave 16th century		
↓	Leerbroek, Zederik	Protestant church	1st half of the 16th century	wooden vaults	
↑	Lexmond, Zederik	Protestant church	14th/15th century	"a striking example of Brick Gothic"	
↓	Tienhoven aan de Lek, Zederik	Protestant church	Gothic 14th/15th century	originally Romanesque	
↑	Zoeterwoude, near Leiden	Protestant Laurentiuskerk	15th/16th century		
↑	Nieuwerkerk aan den IJssel, Zuidplas, NE of Rotterdam	Protestant church	1st half of the 16th century		
↑	Zwijndrecht, southeast of Rotterdam center	Protestant Pietermankerk	2nd half of the 15th century		
↑	Heerjansdam, Zwijndrecht	Protestant church	late 15th century		

South Holland ⬆ : Brielle • Delft • Giessenlanden • Goeree-Overflakkee • Gouda • The Hague • Krimpenerwaard • Leiden • Molenwaard • Nissewward • Zederik

NL provinces: GRON • FRI • N-HOL • S-HOL • ZEE • N-BRA • UTR • GELD • OV-IJ • DREN • LIMB

== Zeeland ==
Background informations:

- RCE = Rijksdienst voor het Cultureel Erfgoed (National Service for the Cultural Heritage)
- M-ZE = Volume on Zeeland of Monumenten in Nederland series, graduate download as PDF see Bibliography: Monumenten in Nederland

Aardenburg • Borsele • Goes • Middelburg • Schouwen-Duiveland • Sluis • Veere • Vlissingen • Zierikzee

↕	Place	Building	Time of construction	Notes	Image
↓	Aardenburg, Sluis (see below), Zeelandic Flanders	Protestant Saint Bavo church	nave 1220, hall choir mid 14th century		
↓	Baarland, Borsele	Protestant Maartenkerk	14th (tower) / 15th century	central nave of a former 3-naved hall church	
↓	's-Gravenpolder, Borsele	Protestant Martinuskerk	14th (choir) / 15th century		
↓	's-Heer Abtskerke, Borsele	Protestant Johannes de Doperkerk	tower 1400, nave 15th century		
↑	Hoedekenskerke, Borsele	Protestant Joriskerk	15th century		
↓	Nisse, Borsele	Protestant church	15th century		
↑	Oudelande, Borsele	Protestant Eligiuskerk	15th century, tower 1400		
↓	Ovezande, Borsele	Protestant Petrus en Pauluskerk	15th century	nave altered in 19th/20th century	
↑	Goes	Grote Kerk		brick & stone	
↓	Goes	Town hall	15th, 16th & 18th centuries		
↑	's-Heer Arendskerke, Goes	Protestant church		tower of brick, nave of stone	
↓	Kattendijke, Goes	Protestant church	about 1404	some details still Romanesque; 18th century alterations, choir then demolished	
↑	Kloetinge, Goes	Protestant Geerteskerk	choir 1275–1300	nave since 1350 as a hall church, in 1480 alteration to an aisleless church	
↓	Kapelle	Protestant Onze Lieve Vrouwe kerk	about 1300	later enlargements also Gothic brick	
↑	Wemeldinge, Kapelle	Protestant Maartenkerk	tower & choir end 14th, nave 15th century		
↓	Kloosterzande, Hulst, Zeelandic Flanders	Protestant former monastic chapel	about 1250		
↑	Kortgene, Noord-Beveland	Cath. St. Nicholas church	tower before 1530	nave since 1670	
↓	Middelburg, Walcheren	Middelburg Abbey, M-ZE p. 161 ff.			
↑	Middelburg, Walcheren	Protestant Choir church , M-ZE 159 ff.		Late Gothic, developed out of the transept of the 13th century abbey church	
↓	Middelburg, Walcheren	"English" church	1480	Protestant former Alexian church	
↑	Middelburg, Walcheren	Protestant former hospital church	1491		
↓	Middelburg, Walcheren	Protestant Nieuwe Kerk	present since 1586	present form after a fire; Romanesque predecessor	
↑	Brouwershaven, Schouwen-Duiveland	Protestant Nicolaaskerk	14th–16th century	pale red brick with belts of white stone	
↓	Dreischor, Schouwen-Duiveland	Protestant Adriaanskerk	14th/15th century	hall church of two naves with wooden barrel vaults	
↑	Burgh-Haamstede, Schouwen-Duiveland	Protestant Johannes de Doperkerk	15th century	pseudo-basilica, choir lost	
↓	Burgh-Haamstede, Schouwen-Duiveland	Plompe Toren (clumsy tower)	15th century	adjacent church lost in 1583	
↑	Burgh-Haamstede, Schouwen-Duiveland	Haamstede Castle	13th & 17th/18th century	some lower parts of the towers	
↓	Nieuwerkerk, Schouwen-Duiveland	Protestant Johanneskerk	15th century	nave between choir and tower demolished in 1583	
↑	Noordgouwe, Schouwen-Duiveland	Protestant Driekoningenkerk	1462		
↓	Noordwelle, Schouwen-Duiveland	Protestant Corneliuskerk	mid 15th century	tower 15th & 16th centuries	
↑	Oosterland, Schouwen-Duiveland	Protestant Jodocuskerk	about 1500	choir & tower medieval, nave about 1700	
↓	Renesse, Schouwen-Duiveland	Protestant Jacobuskerk	1506		
↑	Serooskerke, Schouwen-Duiveland	Protestant Alardskerk	early 15th / late 16th century		
↓	Sluis	Town hall & belfry, M-ZE p. 230	1393–1396	much yellow brick, some red brick and some stone; much reconstruction after heavy damages in WW II; the only municipal belfry in the Netherlands	
↓	Cadzand, Sluis (see also above), Zeelandic Flanders	Protestant Mariakerk	very pale brick; two naved hall church, northern nave 4th quarter of 13th century, southern nave 14th century		
↑	Groede, Sluis	Grote Kerk	tower 14th century, central nave 15th century, southern nave about 1500, damages by floods 1583–1613, northern nave rebuilt 1632–1634		
↓	Sint Kruis, Sluis	Protestant church	14th century	nave probably relic of a former three-naved hall church	
↑	Sint Anna ter Muiden, Sluis	Protestant church	tower 14th century	nave 1650	
↓	Sint-Maartensdijk, Tholen	Protestant Maartenskerk	2nd half of the 15th century	pseudo-basilica	
↑	Veere, Walcheren	Protestant Kleine kerk (Small church), extension of Grote kerk M-ZE p. 244–245	16th century	low hall church, formed by two naves of the former hall choir of the Grote Kerk (Large church)	
↓	Veere, Walcheren	Campveer Tower	15th century	defensive structure of the port of Veere	
↑	Aagtekerke, Veere	Protestant church	renovated in 1625		
↓	Biggekerke, Veere	Protestant church	15th century		
↑	Domburg, Veere	Protestant church	15th century		
↓	Grijpskerke, Veere	Protestant church	oldest part 14th century		
↑	Hoogelande, Veere	Hoogelande Chapel	15th century	restored ruin	
↓	Meliskerke, Veere	Protestant Odulphuskerk	about 1400	nave altered	
↑	Oostkapelle, Veere	Protestant Willibrordkerk	tower 14th century, nave 15th century, altered in 1610		
↓	Oostkapelle, Veere	Westhove Castle	towers 15th century	other parts 17th century, after destruction in 1752	
↑	Serooskerke, Veere	Protestant Johanneskerk	15th century		
↓	Vrouwenpolder, Veere	with proviso: Protestant Pelgrimskerk	1623	After Gothic substitute of the predecessor, destroyed in 1572, using its tufa & (much more) brick	
↑	Westkapelle, Veere	Lighthouse "Westkapelle Hoog"	tower 1409/1410	former church tower, nave demolished in 1831	
↓	Zoutelande, Veere	Protestant Catharinakerk	15th century		
↑	Vlissingen (Flushing)	St James the Great Church	early 14th century & 15th century	hall church	
↓	Oost-Souburg, Vlissingen	Protestant church	tower 14th, nave 15th century		
↑	Ritthem, Vlissingen	Protestant church	16th century	alterations in 1611	
↓	Waarde, Reimerswaal	Protestant church	tower end 14th, nave 15th century, most of the nave lost in 1589		
↑	Zierikzee	Nobelpoort	14th century		
↓	Zierikzee	Noordhavenpoort	14th century & later	outer walls of stone, court walls of brick	
↑	Zierikzee	Zuidhavenpoort (Southport Gate)	early 14th century & about 1500	modernized in 1774	
↑	Zierikzee	Town hall	tower about 1550		
↑	Zierikzee	Protestant Gasthuiskerk	15th/16th century	in 17th century enlarged to the south in Mannerist style	
↑	Zierikzee	Sint Anthonieshofje (Manhuisstraat 7)	mid 16th century		

Zeeland ⬆ : Aardenburg • Borsele • Goes • Middelburg • Schouwen-Duiveland • Sluis • Veere • Vlissingen • Zierikzee

NL provinces: GRON • FRI • N-HOL • S-HOL • ZEE • N-BRA • UTR • GELD • OV-IJ • DREN • LIMB

== North Brabant ==
Background informations:

- RCE = Rijksdienst voor het Cultureel Erfgoed (National Service of Cultural Heritage)
- M-NB = Volume on North Brabant of Monumenten in Nederland series, graduate download as PDF see Bibliography: Monumenten in Nederland

Aalburg • Breda • Eersel • Heusden • Hilvarenbeek • Oirschot • Oss (mun.) • Tilburg • Waalwijk

↕	Place	Building	Time of construction	Notes	Image
↓	Wijk en Aalburg, Aalburg municipality, left bank of Meuse river	Old Protestant church of Aalburg	tower 14th century	ship & choir rebuilt in 1630	
↓	Wijk en Aalburg, Aalburg municipality, left bank of Meuse river	Protestant church of Wijk	tower 15th century	pseudo-basilica, totally rebuilt in the 18th century	
↓	Eethen, Aalburg	Protestant church	choir 15th century	nave 12th century of tufa, in 13th century enlarged by brick, tower simple reconstruction after damage of WW II	
↓	Meeuwen, Aalburg	former Protestant church	tower 1st half of the 14th century	nave lost in World War II	
↑	Veen, Aalburg	Protestant church	nave 12th century of tufa; choir late 13th century early Brick Gothic; tower brick gothic; travers southern nave 15th century, brick, windows later altered		
↓	Bakel, Gemert-Bakel	St. Willibrordus church	tower early 16th century	other parts rebuilt after fires	
↑	Bergeijk	Sint-Petrus' Bandenkerk	choir early 15th, nave & transept 16th century, western two bay of the nave 1888–1893		
↓	Luyksgestel, Bergeijk	St. Martin church	tower 15th century	nave modern	
↑	Bergen op Zoom	Markiezenhof (Countesses' Court)	late 15th century	brick with layers of stone	
↓	Bergen op Zoom	Gevangenpoort	14th century	city side of brick, field side of tufa	
↑	Bladel	Tower of former Sint-Petrus' Bandenkerk	1st half of the 15th century	nave demolished	
↓	Hoogeloon, Bladel	Tower of former St. Pancrace church	15th century	nave demolished in 1928	
↑	Boxtel	St. Peter's Basilica	choir & tower about 1500	nave later, after state of ruins	
↓	Breda	St. Martin's church	15th/16th century	tower since fire of 1873 Gothic Revival	
↑	Breda	Sint Joostkapel	nave about 1435, tower about 1500		
↓	Breda	Waalse Kerk	15th & 16th century		
↑	Breda	St. Anne chapel	late 16th century		
↓	Breda	House van Brecht	1st half of the 16th century	white washed brick	
↑	Gageldonk, Breda	Kapel van Gageldonk	early 165h century		
↓	Chaam, Alphen-Chaam	Protestant Ledevaertkerk	16th century	tower lost in WW II	
↑	Cuijk, west bank of Meuse river	Tower of old St. Martin church	15th century	present church of 1913	
↓	Beers, Cuijk	Tower of St. Lambert church	15th century	top storey & nave 19th century	
↑	Linden, Cuijk	St. Lambert church	15th century		
↓	Deurne	St. Willibrordus church	tower about 1400, choir & transept about 1460, lateral towers & western nave Gothic Revival		
↑	Deurne	Klein Kasteel (Small Castle)	14th century	partly modernized in 17th century, later additions	
↓	Dongen	Protestant Oude Kerk	15th century	between tower and crossing in ruins	
↑	Eersel	St. Willibrordus church	before 1480	1648–1812 Reformed	
↓	Eersel	Onze Lieve Vrouw van Kempenkerk	1464	1648–1957 used as town hall	
↑	Steensel, Eersel	Tower of former St. Lucia church	late 14th century	nave replaced in 1821 and demolished in 1933	
↓	Eindhoven	Mariënhage Abbey	15th century	alterations in the 17th century, additional wings in the 19th century	
↑	Woensel, Eindhoven	Tower of former St. Peter's church	15th century		
↓	Etten-Leur	St. Catherine church	1440–1500	reduced reconstruction 1593–1606, tower 1771	
↑	Geertruidenberg	Geertruidskerk	1315–1539		
↓	Raamsdonk, Geertruidenberg	Protestant Lambertuskerk	about 1500	altering reconstructions after fires of 1716 and 1872	
↑	Grave, left bank of Meuse river	Protestant church	about 1500		
↓	Velp, Grave	Protestant church	tower 15th century, northern aisle and choir 16th century		
↑	Helvoirt, Haaren	Protestant church	15th century		
↓	Oud Gastel, Haaren	St. Lawrence church	tower 15th century	nave 1906	
↑	Helmond	Helmond Castle	about 1325		
↑	Helmond	Croy Castle	15th century		
↓	Helmond	Church tower in the Brugghen street	1400, 1600	church demolished in the 19th century	
↑	's-Hertogenbosch	"De Moriaan" house	1220		
↓	's-Hertogenbosch	Former St. James church/Groot Tuighuis	1430–1584	nave divided into storeys to serve as the Great Arsenal, nowadays a museum	
↑	Heusden on Bergse Maas river	Grote or Sint-Catharinakerk	choir 15th century, northern transept & aisle about 1550		
↓	Hedikhuizen, Heusden	former Protestant church	15th century	nowadays private home	
↑	Heesbeen, Heusden	Protestant church	tower 14th century	nave 18th century and partly of tufa	
↓	Vlijmen, Heusden	Protestant church	tower13th/15th century, nave 14th century, heightened in the 16th century		
↑	Hilvarenbeek	St. Peter in Chains church	nave14th century, transept, Choir & tower 15th century, further enlargements 16th		
↓	Diessen, Hilvarenbeek	St. Willibrord church	choir early 15th, nave mid 15th, transept & tower early 16th century		
↑	Aarle-Rixtel, Laarbeek	Lady Chapel in the Sand	16th century	additions in 1608; 1648–1853 used as a town hall	
↓	Beek en Donk, Laarbeek	Tower of former St. Michael church	15th century	rest of the church demolished about 1813	
↑	Loon op Zand	St. John Decapitation church	choir about 1400, tower about 1450, nave and transept 2nd half of the 15th century, further additions in 19th & 20th centuries		
↓	Made, Drimmelen	Protestant church	15th century	major alterations in 1776	
↑	Schijndel, Meierijstad	St. Servatius church	tower 1525	nave 1839/1840	
↓	Sint-Oedenrode, Meierijstad	Protestant church	1st half of the 15th century	nave 1805	
↑	Mill, Mill en Sint Hubert	Onze-Lieve-Vrouwekapel (Lady Chapel)	15th century	relic of a larger building	
↓	Zevenbergen, Moerdijk	Grote or Catharinakerk	about 1400	additions until 1541; pseudo-basilica	
↑	Gerwen, Nuenen, Gerwen en Nederwetten	Protestant church	15th century	partly renewed after a fire in 1612	
↓	Nederwetten, Nuenen, Gerwen en Nederwetten	Tower of lost St. Lambert church, M-NB p. 357	15th century		
↑	Oirschot	St. Peter's church	1462–early 16th century	western parts with many stone belts	
↓	Middelbeers, Oirschot	Old St. Willibrordus	15th century		
↑	Oostelbeers, Oirschot	Old church tower	1st half of the 14th century		
↓	Moergestel, Oisterwijk	St. John's church	tower about 1500	nave after 1931	
↑	Oosterhout, Oosterhout	St. John's church	15th century, tower 1519–1527	1880–1882 Gothic revival enlargement	
↓	Berghem, Oss	St. Willibrordus church	tower about 1500	nave Gothic Revival of 1902–1903	
↑	Dennenburg, Oss	Former St. Michael's church, M-NB p. 132/133	nave 11th century (orig. tufa), tower 13th century, in early 16th century tower heightened and newly wrapped, nave gothisized by brick, choir added		
↓	Dieden, Oss	Protestant Laurentiuskerk	13th & 15th century		
↑	Herpen, Oss	St. Sebastian church	tower 14th, choir 15th century	nave 1907, Gothic Revival	
↓	Megen, Oss	Gevangentoren (Prison tower)	14th century		
↑	Hooge Mierde, Reusel-De Mierden	St. John the Evangelist church	tower "medieval"	nave 1922	
↓	Lage Mierde, Reusel-De Mierden	St. Steven church	15th century	transept & choir 1912, Gothic Revival	
↑	Roosendaal, near Antwerp (BE)	Former St. John's church	core of the tower 14th/15th century	else of the church Neo-Classical	
↓	Wouw, Roosendaal	Protestant church	tower 15th century, nave restored in 1882, reconstructed until 1951 after severe destructions by German troops in 1944; tower & nave brick with few stone, transept of tufa		
↑	Sint Anthonis	Church of St. Anthony Abbot	parish since 1477	alteraroins in 1834 and 1930/1931	
↓	Sambeek, Boxmeer	Tower of St. John's church	15th century	nave destroyed by WW II	
↑	Ledeacker, Sint Anthonis	St. Catharine church	choir 15th century	else 1837 & 1900	
↓	Sint-Michielsgestel	Old church tower	mid 15th century	alternating layers of brick and of stone (Campine Gothic); lost naves 15th century to 1836 and 1836–1932	
↑	Berlicum, Sint-Michielsgestel	Protestant church	choir 15th century	other parts modernized reconstructions after WW II	
↓	Den Dungen, Sint-Michielsgestel	St. James church	early 16th century	alterations in 1821, tower of 1899	
↑	Son en Breugel, Dommel river	St. Genoveva church	16th century	transept 1960 (!)	
↓	Son, Son en Breugel	Tower of former St. Peter's church	about 1500		
↑	Sprundel, Rucphen	St. John the Baptist church	tower 15th/16th century	nave alteratingly rebuilt in the 17th century	
↓	Terheijden, Drimmelen	Sint-Antonius Abtkerk	tower 15th century, choir about 1500, nave 1542–1546		
↑	Tilburg	St. Dionysus church	core of the tower 15th century	nave 1827–1829, at least 2/3 of the tower wrapped by Gothic Revival additions of 1895	
↓	Berkel-Enschot, Tilburg	Old church tower	15th century	nave demolished in 1839	
↑	Hasselt, Tilburg	Hasselt chapel	15th century	interim used as a private home, 18th century alterations	
↓	Vught	Protestant Lambertuskerk	about 1500	Tower, transept and choir preserved; nave demolished in 1819	
↑	Waalre	Former St. Willibrord church	brick 1469	western enlargement of a 12th-century tufa building	
↓	Waalwijk	Protestant Church at the Harbour	1450–1525	pseudo-basilica with wooden barrel vaults; tower destroyed end 16th century	
↑	Baardwijk, Waalwijk	Old church tower	about 1300 & 15th century		
↓	Waspik, Waalwijk	Protestant church	15th century	pseudo-basilica	
↑	Werkendam, at bifurcation of Boven Merwede	Dussen Castle	14th century		
↓	Woudrichem	Protestant Martinuskerk	15th century	restored in the 16th century, pseudo-basilica	
↑	Andel, Woudrichem	St. Rombout's tower	14th/15th century		
↑	Giessen, Woudrichem	Protestant church	14th century	addition of one more bay in 1856	
↑	Uitwijk, Woudrichem	Protestant church	tower about 1300, nave 14th, choir early 15th century; nave and choir nowadays plastered		

Aalburg • Breda • Eersel • Heusden • Hilvarenbeek • Oirschot • Oss (mun.) • Tilburg • Waalwijk

North Brabant ⬆ : Aalburg • Breda • Eersel • Heusden • Hilvarenbeek • Oirschot • Oss (mun.) • Tilburg • Waalwijk

NL provinces: GRON • FRI • N-HOL • S-HOL • ZEE • N-BRA • UTR • GELD • OV-IJ • DREN • LIMB

== Province of Utrecht ==
Background informations:

- RCE = Rijksdienst voor het Cultureel Erfgoed (National Service of Cultural Heritage)
- M-UT = Volume on the province of Utrecht of Monumenten in Nederland series, graduate download as PDF see Bibliography: Monumenten in Nederland

Amersfoort • De Bilt • Lopik • Oudewater • Stichtse vecht • Utrecht • Utrechtse Heuvelrug • Vianen • Wijk bij Duurstede

↕	Place	Building	Time of construction	Notes	Image
↓	Abcoude, De Ronde Venen	Protestant church	14th/15th century		
↓	Amersfoort	Sint-Joriskerk	14th century – 1500		
↓	Amersfoort	Onze Lieve Vrouwetoren	2nd half of the 15th century		
↓	Amersfoort	Pakhuis (ancient warehouse)	15th century		
↑	Baarn	Protestant Pauluskerk	tower 14th century	nave & choir nowadays plastered	
↓	Bunnik, southeast of Utrecht	Protestant church	tower 12th/13th century	nave nowadays plastered	
↑	Bunschoten, near former Zuiderzee	Protestant church	bell of 1495	Late Gothic; loss of choir & transept in 1790	
↓	Blauwkapel, a suburb of Utrecht	Protestant church	built in one	Late Gothic	
↑	Maartensdijk, De Bilt	Protestant church	15th/16th century		
↓	Westbroek, De Bilt	Protestant church	15th/16th century		
↑	Houten	Protestant "Place church", M-UT p. 125		tower Late Gothic of stone and brick separately and in combination; nave younger, plastered	
↓	Schalkwijk, Houten	Protestant church	choir 14th century	tower upper part Gothic, lower part maybe Romanesque	
↑	IJsselstein	IJsselstein Castle	1418–1427	Campine Gothic	
↓	IJsselstein	Protestant Sint-Nicolaaskerk	14th century	Renaissance tower of 1530–1540	
↑	Leusden	Church tower of Oud-Leusden	about 1300	nave demolished in 1828	
↓	Lopik, near Lek river	Protestant church	1464–1469		
↑	Benschop, Lopik	Grote or Sint-Nicolaaskerk	14th/15th century		
↓	Jaarsveld, Lopik	Protestant church	late 15th century	restored after fire in 17th century, nave nowadays plastered	
↑	Polsbroek, Lopik	Protestant church	tower about 1300, upper storey 15th century	nave 19th century	
↓	Linschoten, Montfoort	Grote or Sint-Janskerk	15th century	predecessor 13th century	
↑	Montfoort	Grote or Sint-Janskerk	present building about 1500	mentioned in 1283	
↓	Oudewater, on Hollandse IJssel	Grote or Sint-Michaëlskerk	15th century	hall church	
↑	Oudewater, on Hollandse IJssel	former St. Usula chapel		choir preserved; brick with stone belts	
↓	Oudewater, on Hollandse IJssel	Castle ruin	about 1250	ruin since 17th century, all stylistical details lost	
↑	Rhenen, northern bank of Nederrijn	(Protestant) Cunerakerk	tower 1492–1531	much stone masonry; upper storeys of the tower all of stone	
↓	Soest	Old church tower	about 1400	tower 1481	
↑	Breukelen, Stichtse Vecht	Protestant church	15th century	tower probably newer	
↓	Kockengen, Stichtse Vecht	Protestant church	15th century		
↑	Loenen aan de Vecht, Stichtse Vecht	Protestant church	tower about 1500	tower of alternating layers, choir (older than nave) of tufa	
↓	Utrecht	Buurkerk, M-UT p. 227–228	13th–15th century		
↑	Utrecht	Utrecht Cathedral	1254–1521	niches of the tower of brick (and the arches above the niches of its two lower storeys), the only two remaining chapels of the lost nave of brick	
↓	Utrecht	Chapter house	about 1400		
↑	Utrecht	Jacobikerk, M-UT p. 231–232	13th & 14th century	hall church with "stone" vaults and parallel roofs	
↓	Utrecht	Geertekerk, M-UT p. 232	13th century	hall church with parallel roofs, nowadays Remonstrant church	
↓	Utrecht	Pieterskerk, M-UT p. 222 ff.	Gothic additions (St. Nicholas chapel (partly) and consistory (mainly) of brick)		
↑	Utrecht	Lutheran church M-UT p. 235	15th century	former Ursuline chapel, wall of the choir in site of massive alterations of other parts in 1743 still Gothic	
↓	Utrecht	Kleine Vleeshal (Small Fleecehall)	1432		
↑	Utrecht	Catharijneconvent	before 1560		
↓	Utrecht	Leeuwenbergh Gasthuis	1567		
↑	Utrecht	Nicolaasklooster, M-UT p. 234	14th century	altered to be a workhouse and afterwards a prison	
↓	Utrecht	Drakenburg house		18th century alterations	
↑	Utrecht	Oudaen house	early 14th century		
↓	Utrecht	various houses in "Oudegracht" street (Fresenburch, Valckenstein, Grijsesteijn)	1569 and similar		
	Utrecht	House in Wed 5	oldest parts probably 13th century	part of a larger building that was split in three in the 14th century; mannerist alterations	
↑	Amerongen, Utrechtse Heuvelrug	Protestant Andrieskerk	tower 1st half of 16th century		
↓	Doorn, Utrechtse Heuvelrug	Protestant Maartenskerk	12th century tufa	tower of brick, Late Gothic choir mixed material	
↑	Maarssen, Utrechtse Heuvelrug	Protestant church	nave since 1519	tower 12th century, of tufa	
↓	Nigtevecht, Utrechtse Heuvelrug	Protestant church	tower about 1300		
↑	Nieuwer Ter Aa, Utrechtse Heuvelrug	Protestant church	late 15th century		
↓	Vreeland, Utrechtse Heuvelrug	Protestant church	tower 13th, nave 15th century		
↑	Vianen	Protestant church	14th/15th century	tower 14th century still with Romanesque forms	
↓	Vianen	Town hall	mid 15th century	front gabel of sandstone, side façade and else of brick	
↑	Vianen	Lekpoort (Lek gate)	mid 15th century		
↓	Everdingen, Vianen	Protestant church		choir of an originally larger church	
↑	Hagestein, Vianen	Protestant church		tower in Romanesque forms, but bell supplies in Gothic forms, nave from 1829	
↓	Wijk bij Duurstede, M-UT p. 295 ff., northern bank of Nederrijn → Lek	Grote or Johannes de Doperkerk	14th/15th century	collegiate since 1366; choir lost	
↑	Wijk bij Duurstede, M-UT p. 295 ff., northern bank of Nederrijn → Lek	Veldpoort (Field gate)	15th century	only lower parts preserved	
↓	Wijk bij Duurstede, M-UT p. 295 ff., northern bank of Nederrijn → Lek	Duurstede Castle	13th–15th century	ruins since 18th century	
↑	Cothen, Wijk bij Duurstede	Protestant church	13th/16th century		
↓	Cothen, Wijk bij Duurstede	Rhijnestein Castle	13th–16th century	alterations 1858–1887	
↑	Langbroek, Wijk bij Duurstede	Protestant church	about 1500		
↓	Langbroek, Wijk bij Duurstede	Lunenburg Castle, M-UT p. 140	before 1339	medieval donjon, by recent reconstruction led back to medieval state	
↑	Langbroek, Wijk bij Duurstede	Walenburg Castle, M-UT p. 140/141	13th & 14th century	medieval donjon with later alterations	
↓	Overlangbroek, Wijk bij Duurstede	Protestant church	tower 15th century		
↑	Woerden	Protestant Petruskerk		Late Gothic pseudo-basilica	
↑	Kamerik, Woerden	Protestant Hippolytuskerk	tower about 1500	nave newer	
↑	Woudenberg	Protestant Catharinakerk	14th century		

Province of Utrecht ⬆ : Amersfoort • De Bilt • Lopik • Oudewater • Stichtse vecht • Utrecht • Utrechtse Heuvelrug • Vianen • Wijk bij Duurstede

NL provinces GRON • FRI • N-HOL • S-HOL • ZEE • N-BRA • UTR • GELD • OV-IJ • DREN • LIMB

== Gelderland ==
Background informations:

- RCE = Rijksdienst voor het Cultureel Erfgoed (National Service of Cultural Heritage)
- M-GE = Volume on Gelderland of Monumenten in Nederland series, graduate download as PDF see Bibliography: Monumenten in Nederland

Barneveld • Berg en Dal • Berkelland • Bronkhorst • Buren • Culemborg • Doesburg • Geldermalsen • Harderwijk • Lingewaal • Lochem • Neerijnen • Nijmegen • Oude IJsselstreek • Overbetuwe • Tiel • Voorst • Wijchen • Zaltbommel • Zutphen • Zevenaar

↕	Place	Building	Time of construction	Notes	Picture
↓	Afferden, Druten	tower of the former reformed church		Gothic	
↓	Arnhem	Waalse kerk or Agnietenkapel	15th century		
↓	Barneveld	Oude Kerk	12th or 13th century	Romanesque & Gothic	
↓	Garderen, Barneveld	Reformed village church (Dorpskerk)	tower 14th century		
↑	Kootwijk, Barneveld	Protestant church	early 16th century		
↓	Beekbergen, Apeldoorn	Protestant church	choir 16th century	nave 15th century of tufa from predecessor, choir of brick	
↑	Groesbeek, Berg en Dal	Protestant church	since 1350		
↓	Kekerdom, Berg en Dal	St. Lawrence church	14th century		
↑	Persingen, Berg en Dal	St. Joris church	15th century		
↓	Borculo, Berkelland	Protestant church	16th century		
↑	Eibergen, Berkelland	Old St. Mathew church	15th century		
↓	Geesteren, Berkelland	Protestant church	13th century	after fire in 1586 reconstructed in 1628; brick and tufa	
↑	Ruurlo, Berkelland	Protestant church	14th century	tower 1468, northern aisle 1561	
↓	Bredevoort, Aalten	Sint-Joriskerk	1599 (reconstruction)	foundations of predecessor from 1316	
↑	Bronckhorst	Protestant church	14th century	restored after fire of 1633	
↓	Baak, Bronckhorst	Baak chapel	1362	tower ruin	
↑	Drempt, Bronckhorst	Protestant church	brick 15th century		
↓	Hengelo (Gelderland), Bronckhorst	Ref. St. Remi church	15th century, choir 14th century		
↑	Hoog-Keppel, Bronckhorst	Protestant church	15th century		
↓	Vorden, Bronckhorst	Protestant church	1235–1500	tower & choir of brick, nave partly of tufa	
↑	Zelhem, Bronckhorst	Ref. St. Lambert church	15th century	tufa, boulders and brick	
↓	Brummen	Oude or Sint-Pancratiuskerk	15th century	upper parts of the tower brick and brick-and-tufa	
↑	Hall, Brummen	St. Ludger church	15th century		
↓	Buren, between rivers Waal and Nederrijn	Ref. St. Lambert church	15th century		
↑	Erichem, Buren	Reformed/St. Joris Kerk	Gothic 15th century		
↓	Ingen, Buren	Ref./Lambertuskerk	14th & 15th century	eastern wall from predecessor of tufa; pseudo-basilica	
↑	Lienden, Buren	Mary the Servant church	choir 16th century	pseudo-basilical nave, only tower of visible brick	
↓	Ommeren, Buren	Protestant church		nave Romanesque, partly tufa, choir Late Gothic	
↑	Ravenswaaij, Buren	with proviso: Reformed/St. Nicholas church, M-GE p. 279	1644 (!)	after destruction of the predecessor by Spanish troops in 1573; net-vaults with some mannerist (?) decorations.	
↓	Zoelen, Buren	Ref./Stefanuskerk	15th century	only upper part of the tower of visible brick	
↑	Zoelmond, Buren	Ref./St. John Evangelist church	15th century and later	Late Gothic tower of visible brick	
↓	Culemborg, southern bank of Lek river	Grote or Sint-Barbarakerk	14th century	after fire reconstruction in early 17th century	
↑	Culemborg, southern bank of Lek river	Town hall	1534–1539		
↓	Culemborg, southern bank of Lek river	St. Elizabeth orphanage	since 1555		
↑	Culemborg, southern bank of Lek river	Citizens' houses		Grote Kerkstraat 11, Slotstraat 10-12	
	Culemborg, southern bank of Lek river	Lanxmeerpoort = Binnenpoort (Inner Gate)	1318 & 1557	gate of the defensive walls, link between the Nieuwstad (New Town, walled in end 14th century) and the old town; upper storey late gothic	
↓	Dinxperlo, Aalten	Liboriuskerk	14th & 15th century		
↑	Doesburg	Martinikerk	15th century		
↓	Doesburg	Gasthuiskerk	since about 1380	decorated eastern gable	
↑	Doesburg	Town hall			
↓	Doetinchem	Sint Catharinakerk	1200 ff.	partly brick, partly tufa, partly mixed ("ham & bacon")	
↑	Dreumel, West Maas en Waal	Reformed church	choir about 1500		
↓	Ede	Oude Kerk	15th & early 16th century	Romanesque predecessor destroyed by a fire in 1420	
↑	Otterlo, Ede	Protestant church	13th century, tower 1500		
↓	Elburg, southeastern coast of former Zuiderzee	Grote or Sint-Nicolaaskerk	since 1396	hall church with hard vaults	
↑	Ermelo, southern coast of former Zuiderzee	Village church		Late Gothic	
↓	Geldermalsen; Betuwe	Reformed church	15th century		
↑	Acquoy, Geldermalsen; Betuwe	tower of Catharinakerk	15th century	very much slanting	
↓	Beesd, Geldermalsen	St Peter's church	tower about 1500	nave later massively altered	
↑	Buurmalsen, Geldermalsen	Reformed church	15th century	pseudo-basilica brick with some tufa	
↓	Gellicum, Geldermalsen	Catholic church of the Nativity	13th century		
↑	Rumpt, Geldermalsen	Reformed church	nave 15th century, tower 1300		
↓	Tricht, Geldermalsen	Reformed church	15th/16th century		
↑	Groenlo, Oost Gelre, Achterhoek	Oude Calixtuskerk	1275–1520		
↓	Harderwijk	Sint-Catharinakerk	1502	restored in 1913	
↑	Harderwijk	Ancient plague hospital	founded in 1441	previous chapel of the Friars' House	
↓	Harderwijk	Vischpoort	14th century		
↑	Hattem, north of Veluwe	Grote or Andreaskerk	1176 –1504	lower tower Romanesque of tufa	
↓	Hattem, north of Veluwe	Dijkpoort (Dyke Gate)	14th century	top storey added in 1908	
↑	Hattem, north of Veluwe	Barn of the former castle Dikke Tinne, M-GE p. 190	15th century	economical building, almost unique relic of Dikke Tinne castle (1404–1777)	
↓	Heelsum, Renkum	Reformed church	1515		
↑	Heerde, Veluwe	St John's church	choir 15th century	tower newer, nave 1923	
↓	Vorchten, Heerde	Reformed church	nave 13th century	tufa and brick; choir Late Gothic	
↑	Heumen, near Meuse river	Protestant church	12th–15th century		
↓	Overasselt, Heumen	St. Anthony	15th century	only choir; rest lost in the 17th century	
↑	Overasselt, Heumen	St. Walrickkapel		Romanesque & Gothic	
↓	Horssen, Druten	former St. Bonifatius church	14th century		
↑	Heukelum, Lingewaal	Reformed church	15th century	western enlargement 1727	
↓	Spijk, Lingewaal	reformed church of Spijk		Late Gothic, choir Early Gothic	
↑	Gendt, Lingewaard	Gendt Reformed church	15th century	nave missing, tower & choir existent, choir recently plastered	
↓	Lochem, east of Zutphen	Grote or Sint-Gudulakerk	Gothic since 1300	parts of the walls of tufa; hall church with hard vaults	
↑	Almen, Lochem	Reformed church	14th century	19th century enlargements	
↓	Gorssel, Lochem	Reformed church	tower 15th century	nave since reconstruction after WW II modern	
↓	Ammerzoden, Maasdriel	Ammersoyen Castle	1354	one of the best preserved medieval castles in the Netherlands	
↑	Ammerzoden, Maasdriel	Reformed church	14th–16th century	tower (reconstructed in mid 16th century and after WW II) & choir in function, nave ruins	
↓	Well, Maasdriel	Reformed church, M-GE p. 330	nave 1st half of the 16th century	pseudo-basilica; choir 1949/1950 reconstruction of the medieval one, demolished in 1842	
↑	Well, Maasdriel	Well- or Malsen Castle, M-GE p. 330 not to be confused with Well Castle	14th-century towers	altered in the 16th century; roof 1884	
↑	Beek, Montferland, Achterhoek	St. Martin church	15th century		
↓	Didam, Montferland	Onze-Lieve-Vrouwekerk	14th/15th century	Late Gothic pseudo-basilica	
↑	's-Heerenberg, Montferland	Huis Bergh	14th–15th–17th cent.		
↓	's-Heerenberg, Montferland	Sts Pancrace & George church	13th–15th centuries	reducing reconstruction in early 17th century	
↑	Hien, Dodewaard, Neder-Betuwe	Reformed church	tower 15th century	nave 17th century	
↓	IJzendoorn, Neder-Betuwe	Reformed church	built since 1384		
↑	Opheusden, Neder-Betuwe	Reformed church	1524	pseudo-basilica, reconstruction after WW II	
↓	Ophemert, Neerijnen	Reformed church	Late Gothic	nave newer	
↑	Tuil, Neerijnen	Reformed church	lower part of the tower 14th century	nave of tufa	
↓	Varik, Neerijnen	Tower of the former Reformed church	15th century	upper part brick & tufa	
↑	Nijkerk, southern edge of former Zuiderzee	Grote kerk	1461 & 1540	pseudo-basilica	
↓	Nijmegen	Sint-Nicholas Chapel		Gothic relaunch of a Carolingian stone building	
↑	Nijmegen	Saint Stephen's Church		only parts of brick	
↓	Nijmegen	Kruittoren (Powder Tower)	1426		
↑	Etten, Oude IJsselstreek	Ref. Maartenskerk	about 1440	outer skin more tufa than brick	
↓	Silvolde, Oude IJsselstreek	Reformed church	choir 15th century	more parts Romanesque, choir Gothic brick	
↑	Varsseveld, Oude IJsselstreek	Grote or Laurentiuskerk	13th century	rebuilt after collapse in 1723, Gothic pseudo-basilica	
↓	Andelst, Overbetuwe	Reformed church	choir 1440	nave Early Romanesque	
↑	Driel, Overbetuwe	Reformed church	15th century		
↓	Elst, Overbetuwe	Grote or Sint Maartenskerk	1444–1483	some sandstone decorations; lower parts of the tower of tufa	
↑	Ewijk, Overbetuwe	Reformed church	15th century	recently plastered	
↓	Hemmen, Overbetuwe	Reformed church		Late Gothic	
↑	Herveld, Overbetuwe	Reformed church	14/15th century	enlarged to be a hall church	
↓	Heteren, Overbetuwe	tower of the Reformed church	early 14th century	separate nave much younger	
↑	Randwijk, Overbetuwe	Reformed church	?	nave free replica after WW II destructions	
↓	Zetten, Overbetuwe	Reformed church	choir 15th century	other parts new in 1912	
↑	Putten, south edge of former Zuiderzee	Reformed church	15th/16th century		
↓	Rheden, east of Arnhem	Reformed church	brick 15th century	choir Gothic of brick, else (Romanesque & Gothic) with a skin of tufa	
↑	Scherpenzeel, west of Veluwe	Reformed church	15th century	pseudo-basilica	
↓	Tiel, Betuwe	Grote or Sint-Maartenskerk	1420–1450	tower of tufa, naves of brick; incomplete	
↑	Tiel, Betuwe	Cecilia Chapel = Lutheran church	15th/16th century	choir higher and newer than nave	
↓	Kapel-Avezaath, Tiel	Ref. St. Agatha chapel	14th century	choir newer, Late Gothic	
↑	Wadenoijen, Tiel	Reformed church	choir 15th century	tower & nave Romanesque of tufa, choir brick Gothic	
↓	Velp, near Arnhem	Oude Jan church	chapel early 16th century	main 12th century of tufa; out of religious use since 1841	
↑	Nijbroek, Voorst	Reformed church	nave 14th, choir 15th century		
↓	Terwolde, Voorst	Reformed church	15th century		
↑	Twello, Voorst	Reformed church		Late Gothic net vaults	
↓	Wageningen, west of Arnhem	Grote Kerk	13th/16th century	Romanesque & Gothic; enlarged in the 19th century	
↑	Wamel, West Maas en Waal	Reformed church	15th century		
↑	Westervoort, Betuwe	Reformed church	14th/15th centuries	tower, major part of the choir and arches of the nave of brick; pseudo-basilica	
↓	Balgoij, Wijchen, north bank of Meuse	Tower of St. John's church	15th century (?)	nave demolished	
↑	Batenburg, Wijchen	Old church	1443	relic of a larger building	
↓	Bergharen, Wijchen	Reformed church	15th century	pseudo-basilica	
↑	Leur, Wijchen	Reformed church	nave 14th, choir 16th century		
↓	Winterswijk	Jacobskerk	nave 13th century	especially the choir	
↑	Zaltbommel	Great or St-Martin's Church	14th century		
↓	Zaltbommel	Hospital Tower	2nd half of the 15th century		
↑	Zaltbommel	House "'t Wapen van Gelderland"		Late Gothic	
↓	Zaltbommel	Waterpoort (Watergate)	14th century	the only surviving city gate	
↑	Zutphen	Broederenkerk	early 14th century		
↓	Zutphen	Nieuwstadskerk	13e–15th century		
↑	Zutphen	Walburgiskerk	11th–16th century	nave	
↓	Zutphen	Drogenapstoren (tower)	1444–1446	originally "Saltpoort"	
↑	Zevenaar, right side of the Rhine	Reformed church	late 15th century	19th century alterations, western four bays medieval	
↓	Aerdt, Zevenaar	Reformed church	16th century		
↑	Angerlo, Zevenaar	St. Gallus church	choir mid 14th century, tufa	else Romanesque	
↓	Lathum, Zevenaar	Reformed church	1528		
↑	Oud-Zevenaar, Zevenaar	Cath. St. Martinus church	15th century		

Gelderland ⬆ : Barneveld • Berg en Dal • Berkelland • Bronkhorst • Buren • Culemborg • Doesburg • Geldermalsen • Harderwijk • Lingewaal • Lochem • Neerijnen • Nijmegen • Oude IJsselstreek • Overbetuwe • Tiel • Voorst • Wijchen • Zaltbommel • Zutphen • Zevenaar

NL provinces: GRON • FRI • N-HOL • S-HOL • ZEE • N-BRA • UTR • GELD • OV-IJ • DREN • LIMB

== Overijssel ==
Background informations:

- RCE = Rijksdienst voor het Cultureel Erfgoed (National Service of Cultural Heritage)
- M-OV = Volume on Overijssel of Monumenten in Nederland series, graduate download as PDF see Bibliography: Monumenten in Nederland

Deventer • Kampen • Steenwijk(-erland) • Zwolle

↕	Place	Building	Time of construction	Notes	Image
↓	Borne, Twente	Oude Kerk	15th century		
↓	Dalfsen, on Vecht river	Grote Kerk	about 1455	pseudo-basilica; lower part of the tower of tufa	
↓	Deventer	Lebuïnuskerk	hall church since 1454	outside tufa & sandstone, inside walls, pillars & arcades of brick	
↓	Deventer	Broederenkerk	1335–1338		
↑	Deventer	Waag (The Scales)	1528–1531		
↓	Deventer	relics of St. Mary church, M-OV p. 104 f.	14th & 15th century	Nieuwe Markt 33 & 35, columns and arches of brick	
↑	Deventer	relics of Cecilia convent			
↑	Deventer	Groote- or Heilige Geestgasthuis			
↓	Deventer	Boterstraat 3, Boterstraat 4, Olde Munte & Kronenburg			
↑	Deventer	Deken Doyshuis, 12633	13th century	a chapterhouse	
↓	Deventer	The Blue Stone (house)		originally Gothic	
↑	Deventer	Various citizens' houses, some with Baroque or later alterations			
↓	Den Ham, Twenterand	with proviso: tower of the Protestant church	1607	rather After Gothic	
↑	Hasselt, Zwartewaterland	Grote or Sint-Stephanuskerk	14th/15th century		
↓	Heemse, Hardenberg	Protestant Lambertuskerk	1520 or earlier	Gothic brick tower of the plastered church	
↑	Hellendoorn	Protestant church	tower 1547	Late Gothic brick choir	
↓	Kampen	Bovenkerk	14th/15th centuries	mixed with stone	
↑	Kampen	Broederkerk	late 15th century		
↓	Kampen	Broederpoort	1465	altered to Renaissance in 1615	
↑	Kampen	Koornmarktpoort	14th century		
↓	Losser, Twente	St. Martin's tower	about 1500	church demolished	
↑	Mastenbroek, Zwartewaterland	Ref. Our Lady of the Sun church (Onze Lieve Vrouw ter Zon)	1408		
↓	Olst, Olst-Wijhe	Protestant church	15th/16th century	only upper parts of brick	
↑	Wijhe, Olst-Wijhe	Protestant Nicolaaskerk	15th century	tufa (lower parts of the tower) & brick	
↓	Wesepe, Olst-Wijhe	Protestant church	14th century	enlarged (higher) in 17th century	
↑	Steenwijk, Steenwijkerland	Grote or Sint-Clemenskerk	14th–16th century	brick and stone	
↓	Steenwijk, Steenwijkerland	Kleine or Onze-Lieve-Vrouwekerk	1477	Reformed since 1592; pseudo-basilica	
↑	Oldemarkt, Steenwijkerland	Protestant church	early 15th century	later alterations	
↓	Paasloo, Steenwijkerland	Protestant church	early 16th century	17th century alterations	
↑	Wanneperveen, Steenwijkerland	Protestant church	1502	enlarged in the 18th, reduced in the 19th century	
↓	Vollenhove, Steenwijkerland	Grote or Sint-Niclaaskerk	14th century		
↑	Vollenhove, Steenwijkerland	Holy Ghost chapel	15th century	former hospital chapel	
↓	Vollenhove, Steenwijkerland	Kleine or Onze-Lieve-Vrouwekerk	1434, tower 1458		
↑	Wierden	Protestant church	tower end 15th century	nave 1928	
↑	Zwolle	Grote or Sint-Michaëlskerk	1406–1466		
↑	Zwolle	Broerenkerk	1465	former Dominican Monastery	
↑	Zwolle	Old Library at the Broerenkerkplein	1465–1493	former conventual building	

Overijssel ⬆ : Deventer • Kampen • Steenwijk(-erland) • Zwolle

NL provinces: GRON • FRI • N-HOL • S-HOL • ZEE • N-BRA • UTR • GELD • OV-IJ • DREN • LIMB

== Drenthe ==
Background informations:

- RCE = Rijksdienst voor het Cultureel Erfgoed (National Service of Cultural Heritage)
- M-DR = Volume on Drenthe of Monumenten in Nederland series, graduate download as PDF see Bibliography: Monumenten in Nederland

↕	Place	Building	Time of construction	Notes	Picture
↑	Anloo, Aa en Hunze	Protestant church	choir Gothic 15th century	nave Romanesque tufa about 1100, tower Romanesque brick, choir "romanized" about 1900	
↓	Rolde, Aa en Hunze	Protestant Jacobuskerk	15th century		
↓	Borger, Borger-Odoorn	Tower of Protestant Willibrordkerk	14th century	nave newer	
	Coevorden	Coevorden Castle	15 & 16th centuries	painted but not plastered	
↓	Oosterhesselen, Coevorden	Protestant church	15th century	nave plastered	
↓	Sleen, Coevorden	Protestant church	15th century	following RCE, the nave is essentially medieval	
↑	Zweeloo, Coevorden	Protestant church	14th century		
	Emmen, Netherlands	Grote Kerk M-DR p. 113 ff.	tower 12th century & 1456	Gothic heightening of the Romanesque tower; nave 19th century	
↓	Meppel	Protestant Grote or Mariakerk	1422		
↑	Kolderveen, Meppel	Protestant church	14th century, accomplished 1471		
↓	Nijeveen, Meppel	Protestant church	since 1477	alterations 1627	
↑	Beilen, Midden-Drenthe	Protestant Stefanuskerk	15th/16th centuries		
↓	Westerbork, Midden-Drenthe	Protestant Stefanuskerk	15th century		
↑	Norg, Noordenveld	Protestant Sint-Margaretakerk	13th century	Romanesque & Gothic	
↓	Roden, Noordenveld	Protestant Catharinakerk	13th, aisles, choir & tower 15th century		
↑	Eelde, Tynaarlo	Protestant church	14th century		
↓	Vries, Tynaarlo	Protestant church	13th century	nave of tufa, Late Gothic choir of brick	
↑	Zuidlaren, Tynaarlo	Protestant church	about 1300		
↓	Diever, Westerveld	Protestant Pancratiuskerk	Gothic 13th & 16th century, lower parts of the walls of tufa		
↑	Dwingeloo, Westerveld	Protestant Nicolaaskerk	15th century		
↓	Havelte, Westerveld	Protestant Clemenskerk	enlarged in the 15th century		
↑	Vledder, Westerveld	Protestant church	15th century		
↑	Ruinen, De Wolden	Protestant Mariakerk	15th century		
↑	Ruinerwold, De Wolden	Protestant Bartholomeuskerk	15th/16th century		

NL provinces: GRON • FRI • N-HOL • S-HOL • ZEE • N-BRA • UTR • GELD • OV-IJ • DREN • LIMB

== Province of Limburg ==
Background informations:

- RCE = Rijksdienst voor het Cultureel Erfgoed (National Service of Cultural Heritage)
- M-LI = Volume on the province of Limburg of Monumenten in Nederland series, graduate download as PDF see Bibliography: Monumenten in Nederland

Gennep • Roermond • Venlo • Venray

↕	Place	Building	Time of construction	Notes	Picture
↓	Broekhuizen, Horst aan de Maas	St. Nicholas church	about 1500	enlarged by two bays in the west in 1951	
↓	Echt, Echt-Susteren	Sint-Landricuskerk	15th century	two western bay and tower 1873	
↓	Eygelshoven, Kerkrade	St. John the Baptist church	early 16th century	tower mostly of stone, older	
↓	Gennep	Kasteel Heijen	16th & 17th centuries	Gothic & Renaissance	
↑	Gennep	Molenstraat 11	early 16th century		
↓	Ven-Zelderheide, Gennep	Chapel of Abbot Anthony	16th century		
↑	Grathem, Leudal	St. Severinus church	15th-century pseudo-basilica of brick, 13th-century tower & 1500 choir of marl		
↓	Mook, Mook en Middelaar	church	chapels 15th, tower 16th century	other an older parts of marl; enlargement 1910	
↑	Nederweert	St. Lambert church	tower 1467	nave & choir 1840	
↓	Oirsbeek, Schinnen	St. Lambert church	tower 1514	layers of brick and of marl; nave of similar outfit built in 1954	
↑	Roggel, Leudal	St. Peter's church	15th century	pseudo-basilica in 1853 half altered to a hall church by a Gothic Revival high northern aisle, tower altered reconstruction after WW II; western part of nave and southern aisle medieval	
↓	Roermond	St. Christopher's Cathedral	15th/16th century	basilical nave, hall choir	
↑	Roermond	Protestant Church of the Lesser Brethren	about 1500	possibly some parts of 13th century; hall church	
↓	Roermond	former Carolus Chapel	1398 and 16th century	15th century addition of the vestry, since 1554 rebuilt after a fire, since 1748 structural alterations	
↑	Roermond	Begards monastery	chapel about 1500	southern wing building later altered to Baroque	
↓	Roermond	House Drehmans, M-LI p. 307	1520		
↑	Roermond	Huis De Toren (The Tower house)	since 15th		
↓	Roermond	Rattentoren (Rat tower) of the defensive walls	14th century		
↑	Asselt, Roermond	St. Dionysius church	tower 1515	choir Romanesque of boulders, nave Neo-Romanesque with a skin of boulders	
↓	Schinveld, Onderbanken	St. Eligius church	tower about 1500	heightened in the 19th century	
↑	Geleen, Sittard-Geleen	Sts. Marcelline & Peter church	tower 1504, other parts 19th century	only tower medieval, embrasure of the portal of brick, else irregular pathwork of brick and plastered wall sections	
↓	Sittard, Sittard-Geleen	St. Peter's church	13th–16th centuries	basilical nave of brick, lower parts of the tower brick and stone layers, transept, choir and upper tower of stone	
↑	Venlo	Sint-Martinuskerk	1480		
↓	Venlo	Town hall M-LI p. 387 ff.	~1300, 1385	Renaissance alterations 1597–1601	
↑	Venlo	former St. James chapel	about 1500/1533	former hospital chapel, nowadays part of an office building	
↓	Venlo	St. George church	1509, 1718	medieval choir as part of an 18th-century church	
↑	Venlo	Romerhuis , M-LI p. 389	1521		
↑	Venlo	Chapel of Mariaweide monastery, M-LI p. 386	end 15th century	other present buildings of the Dominican nunnery much newer	
↓	Venray	St. Peter's church	2nd half of the 15th century	tower substitute after WW II; pseudo-basilica	
↑	Blitterswijck, Venray	Our Dear Lady church	15th century	tower & nave medieval, choir & transept 1951	
↓	Castenray, Venray	Sint-Matthiaskerk, M-LI p. 184	choir 15th century	medieval choir integrated in the Gothic Revival church of 1911, tower 1946–1948 (after destruction in WW II)	
↑	Leunen, Venray	St. Catharine church	choir 15th century	nave 1888, tower 1907	
↓	Merselo, Venray	St. John the Baptist church	choir 15th century	nave 1890/1891	Sint-Johannes de Doperkerk (Merselo)
↑	Oirlo, Venray	St. Gertrude church	choir 15th century	else after WW II destruction replaced by a new church in 1851–1958	
↑	Oostrum, Venray	Our Dear Lady church	choir & old nave 15th century	1935–1936 new cross-shaped basilica laterally attached to the old church	
↑	Weert	Sint-Martinuskerk	1456	hall church, Campine Gothic	
↑	Weert	Paterskerk of Lesser Bethren monastery	1512–1526	2-naved hall church	

Gennep • Roermond • Venlo • Venray

Limburg ⬆ : Gennep • Roermond • Venlo • Venray

Netherlands ⬆ – provinces: GRON • FRI • N-HOL • S-HOL • ZEE • N-BRA • UTR • GELD • OV-IJ • DREN • LIMB

International navigation: BELA • BEL • CZ • DK • ENG • EST • FIN • FRA • GER • HUNG • ITA • LAT • LIT • NL • POL • RUS • SK • SWE • SWI • UKR

== Bibliography ==
- Ronald Stenvert, Chris Kolman, Ben Olde Meierink, Margreet Tholens ...: Monumenten in Nederland, 12 volumes (1996–2006), available as PDF from http://www.dbnl.org/tekst/sten009monu00_01/
