= Grote Kerk (Wageningen) =

Church in Wageningen, Netherlands

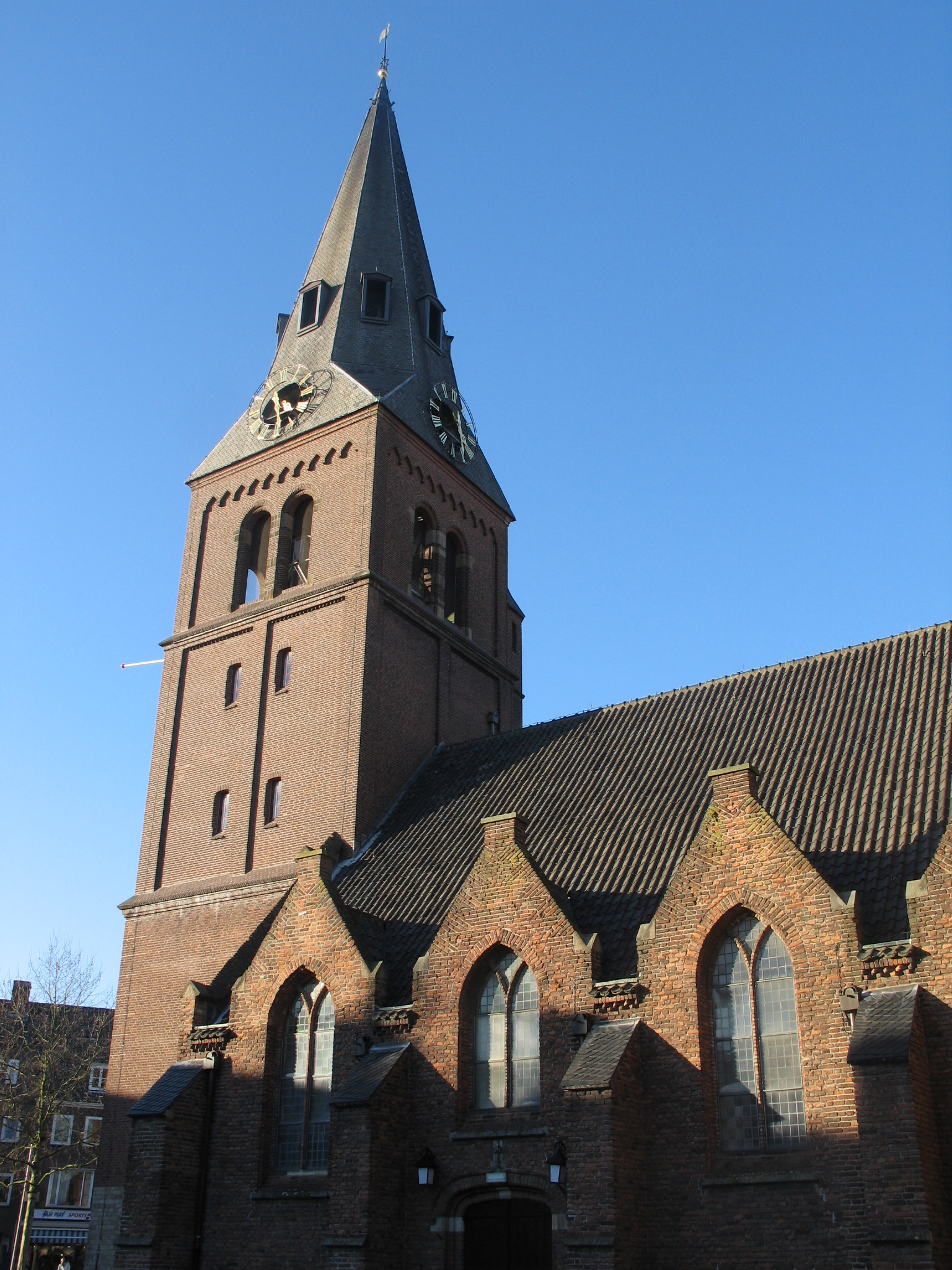

The Grote Kerk or Johannes de Baptistkerk is a three-aisled cruciform church on the Markt in Wageningen in the Dutch province of Gelderland. The first church on this site was built in Romanesque style after Wageningen received city rights in 1263. In the 15th century the church was expanded with a north aisle in Gothic style. In the 16th century, the rest of the church was also renovated in this style. In 1861-1862 the church was restored under the direction of the architect L. H. Eberson, during which the tower was fitted with four later highly criticized gables. The church has the status of a national monument. In 1810 the church came into the possession of the Reformed Municipality of Wageningen, but the tower always remained in the possession of the civil municipality.

On August 25, 2017, the Grote Kerk in Wageningen was officially transferred to the Old Gelderse Churches Foundation by the Protestant Community in Wageningen. The management and operation is done by a supporting foundation, the Grote Kerk Wageningen Foundation. The church will continue to be used for church services. The Grote Kerk Wageningen Foundation aims to develop other activities that can cover the regular costs for maintenance and operation. The aim is to give the church building a central place and a broad function for the entire local community of Wageningen. A renovation is planned for 2019 and 2020, the intention being to give the church a multifunctional character.
