= Overlangbroek =

Coordinates: 51°59′N 5°23′E

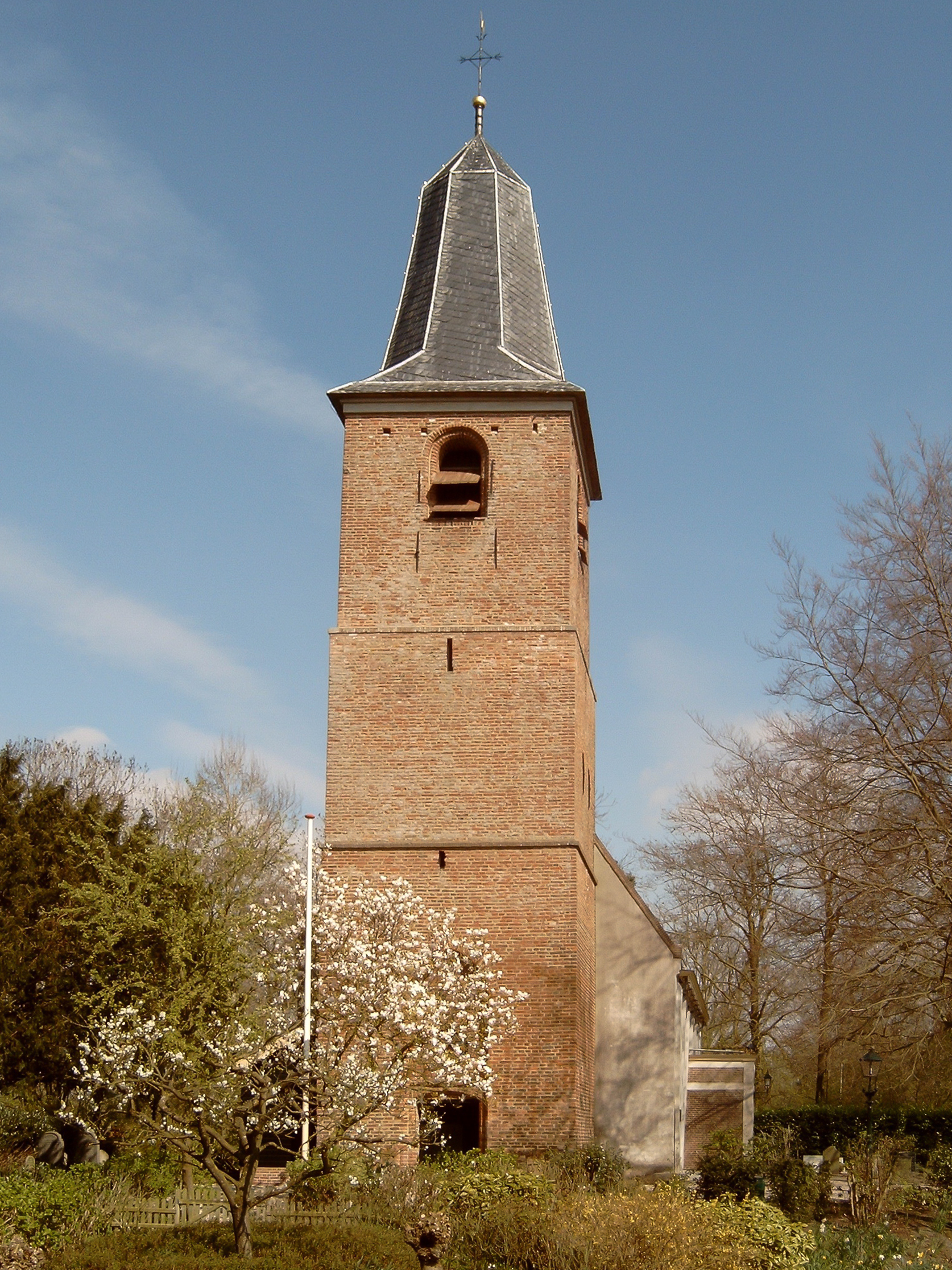
Overlangbroek Church

Overlangbroek is a former village in the Dutch province of Utrecht. It is a part of the municipality of Wijk bij Duurstede, and lies about 11 km southeast of Zeist. The village officially merged with Nederlangbroek into Langbroek in 1978.
