= Eastrum =

- Village
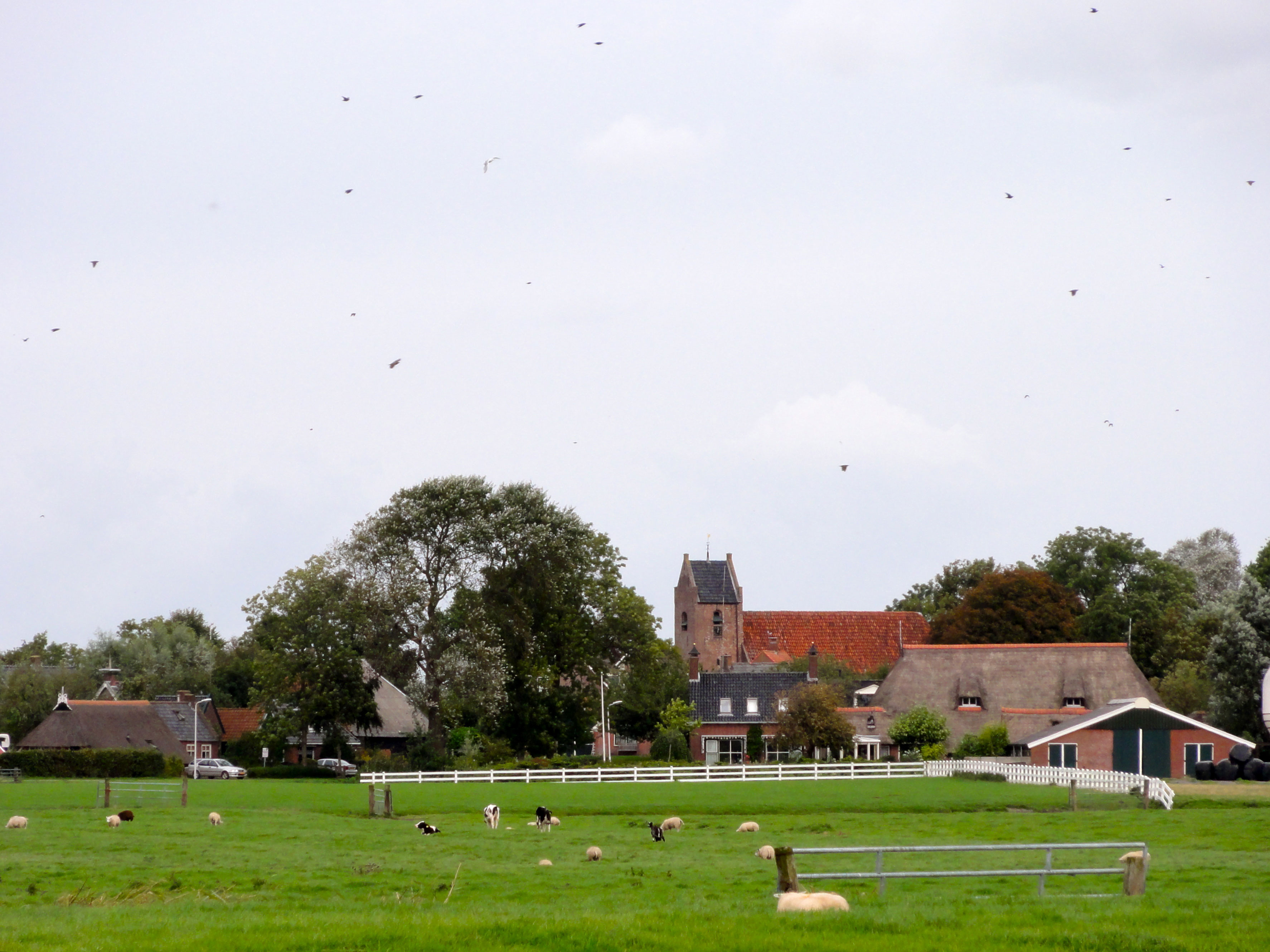

- Flag Coat of arms

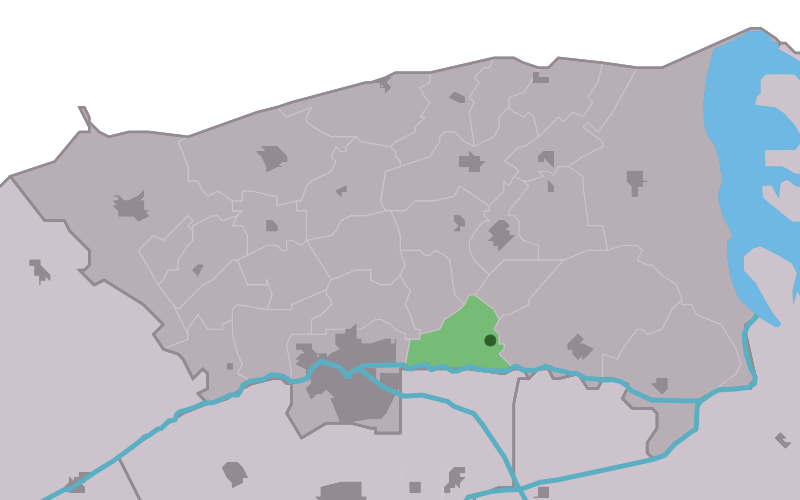
- Location in the former Dongeradeel municipality

- Location in the Netherlands Eastrum (Netherlands)
- Country: Netherlands
- Province: Friesland
- Municipality: Noardeast-Fryslân

Area
  - Total: 4.26 km^{2} (1.64 sq mi)
- Elevation: 0.5 m (1.6 ft)

Population (2021)
  - Total: 190
  - Density: 45/km^{2} (120/sq mi)
- Time zone: UTC+1 (CET)
  - Summer (DST): UTC+2 (CEST)
- Postal code: 9125
- Dialing code: 0519

Eastrum (Dutch: Oostrum) is a village in Noardeast-Fryslân in the province of Friesland, the Netherlands. It had a population of around 188 in January 2017. Before 2019, the village was part of the Dongeradeel municipality.

== History ==
The village was first mentioned in 1449 as Aesterma, and means "eastern settlement". Eastrum is a terp (artificial living mound) village from the Middle Ages. The terp is 4.5 metres (15 ft) tall, but a large part has been excavated around 1900. The Dutch Reformed church dates from the 16th century, but has a 13th-century tower.

Mellema State was a castle-like stins which probably dated from the 14th century. About 80% of the area around Eastrum was owned by the Mellemas. In 1735, it was demolished and reused to build Heemstra State in Oentsjerk.

In 1840, Eastrum was home to 295 people. In 2006, artefacts were discovered in the terp during an archaeological exploration dating from 3400 to 2850 BC.

The village's official name was changed from Oostrum to Eastrum in 2023.

== Gallery ==
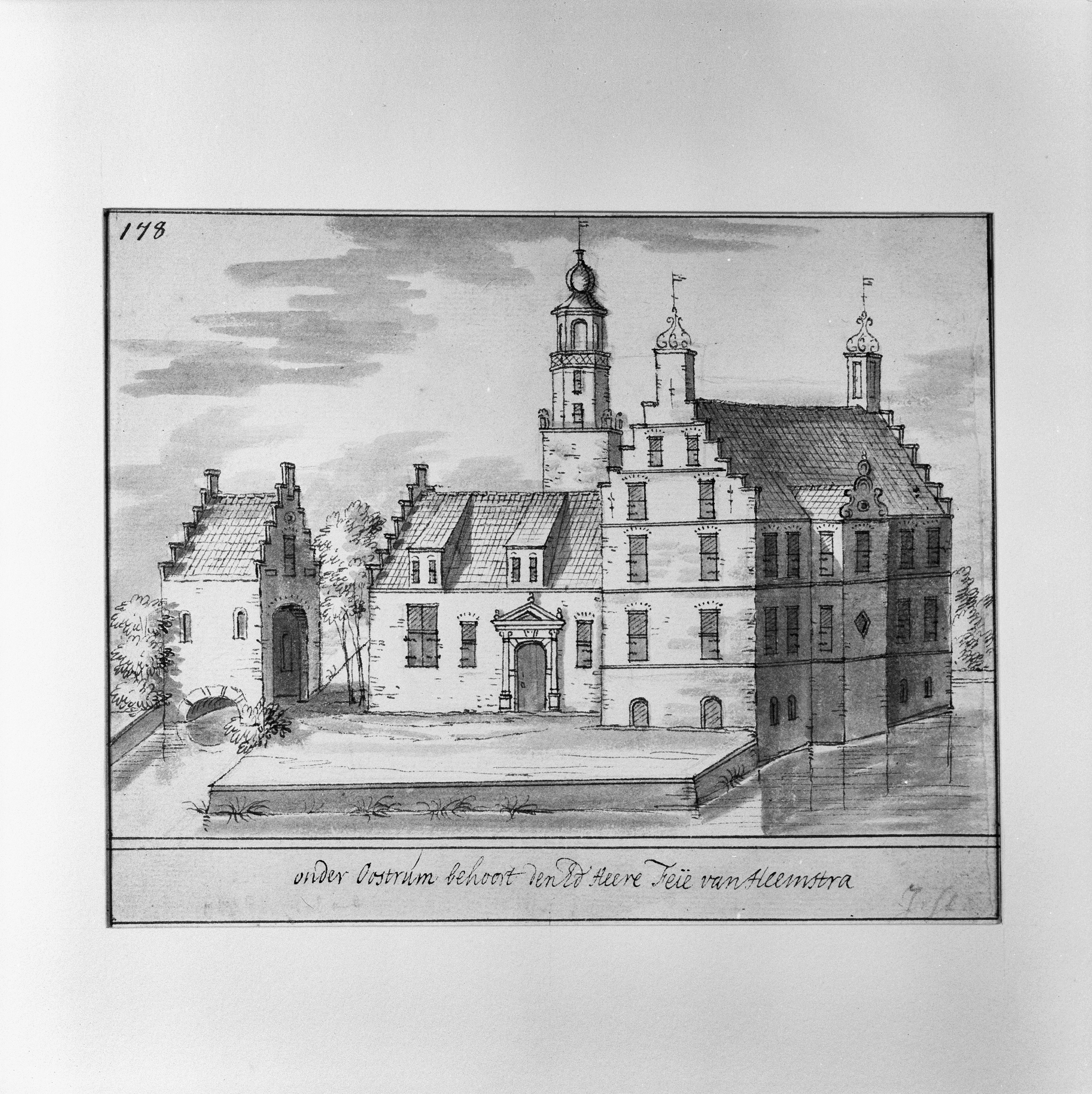
Drawing of Mellema State

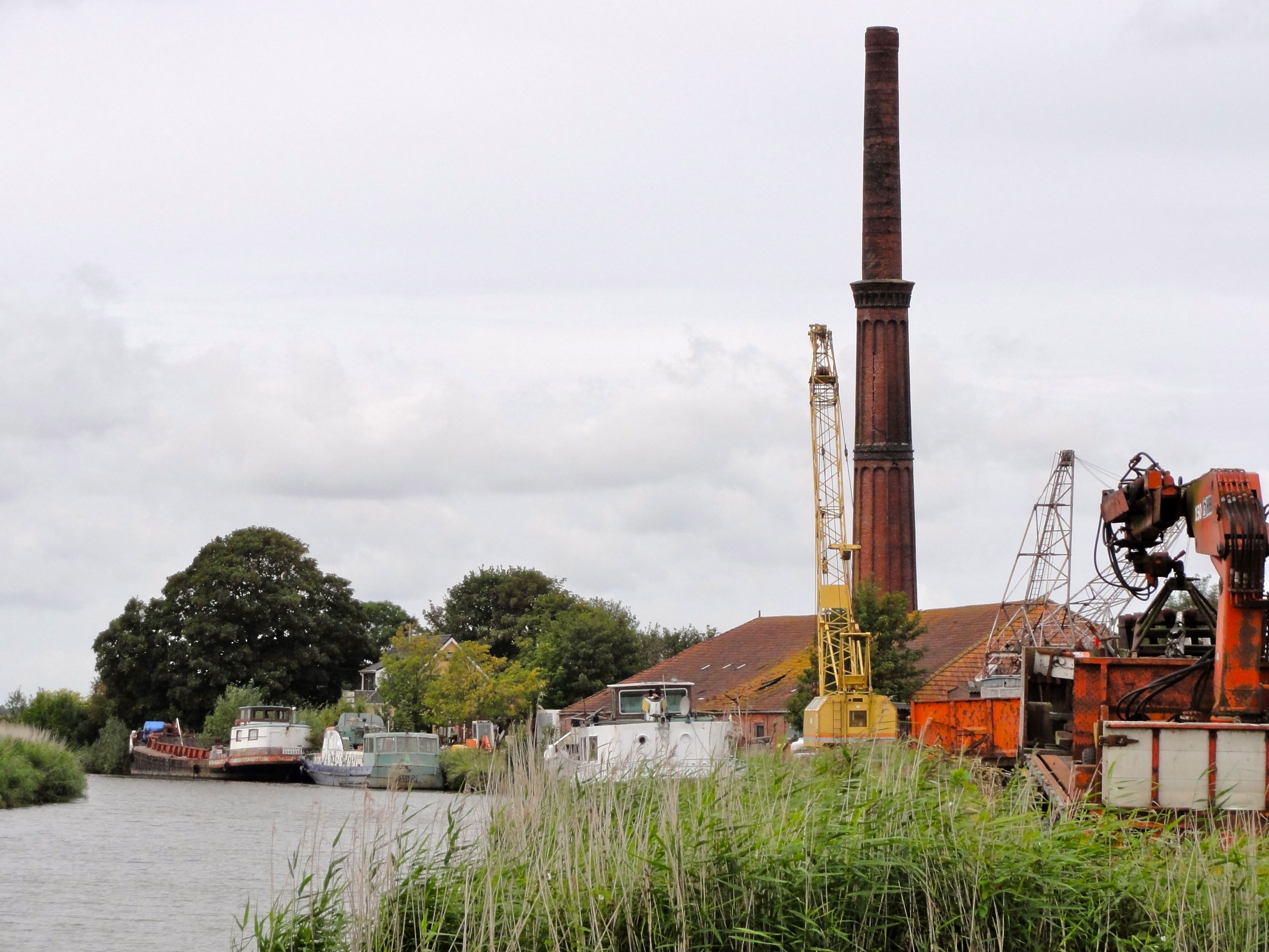
Brickworks
