= Lutherse Kerk (Delft) =

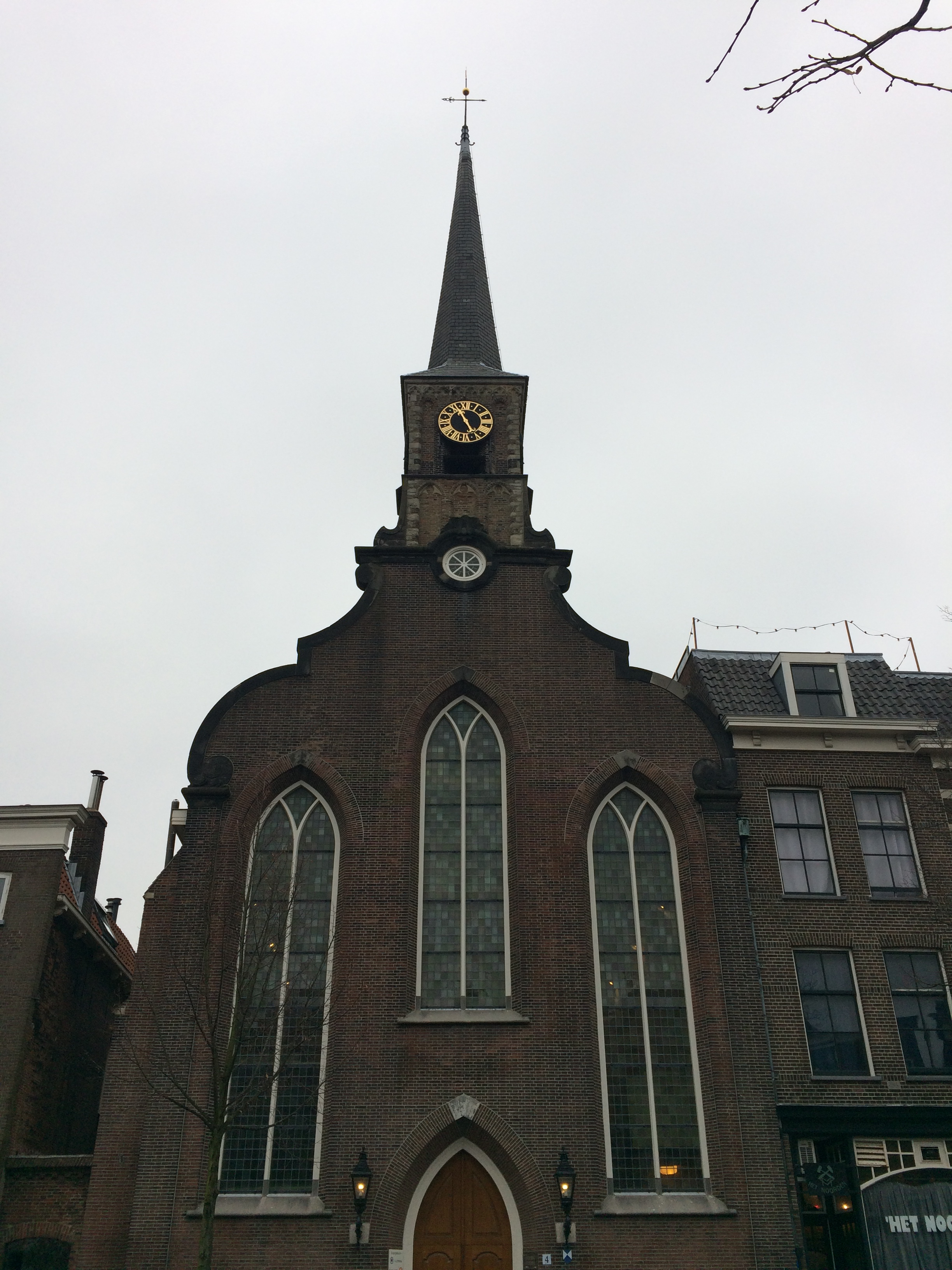
- Front of the Lutherse Kerk in Delft
- Lutherse Kerk
- 52.0156°N 4.3534°E
- Country: Netherlands
- Denomination: Lutheran

The Lutherse Kerk, also known as St George's Chapel, is an 18th-century church in the Dutch city of Delft. The church's foundations were laid in the 15th or 16th centuries, with a wooden structure built on top of it. This first wooden church burnt down in 1536, and the city of Delft erected an armoury where it had stood. The armoury was converted into the current Lutheran church in 1768, and a new stone facade and steeples were added to the existing building.
