= Den Andel =

- Village
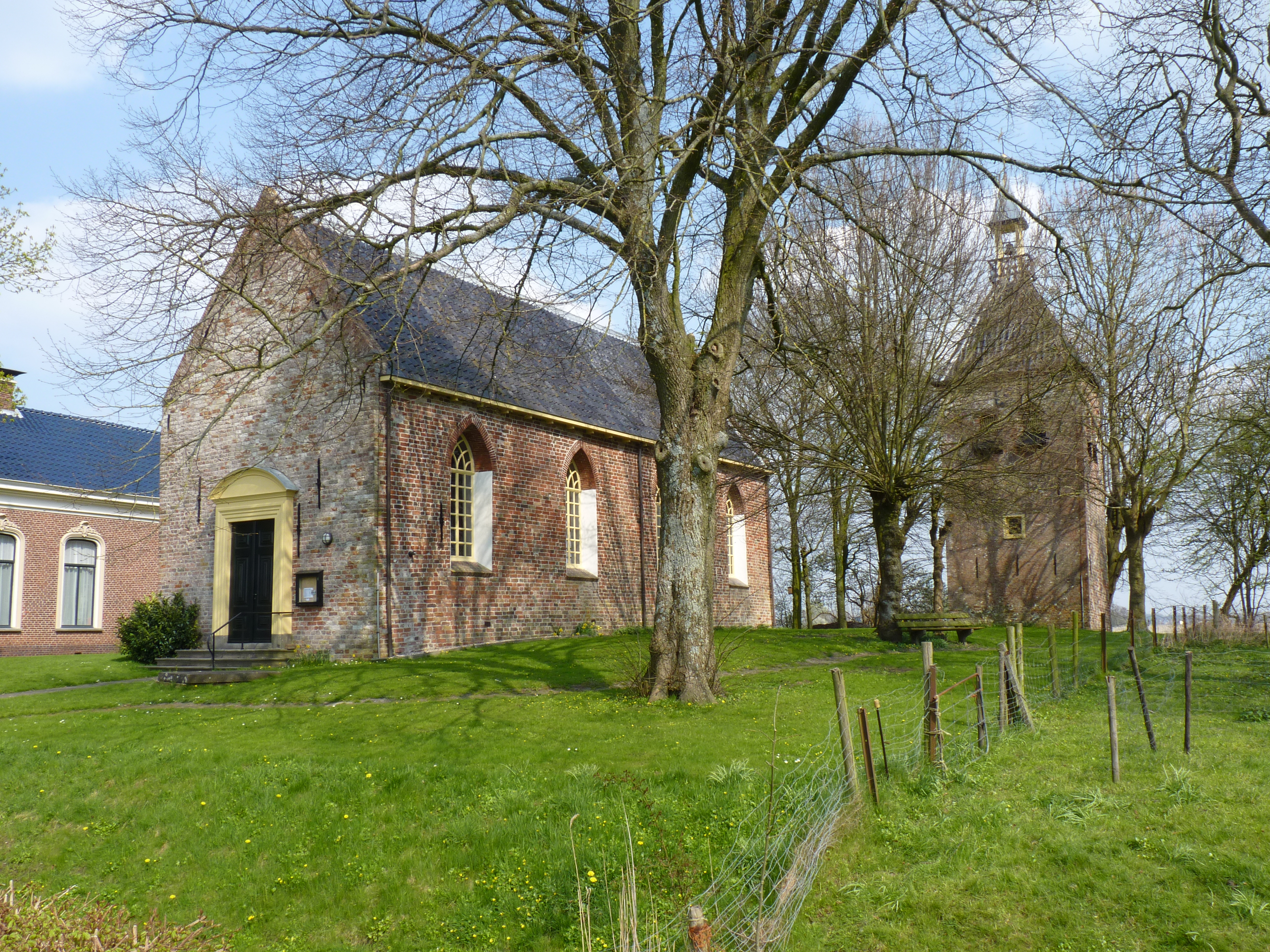
- Church and tower of Den Andel

- Location in the province of Groningen Den Andel (Netherlands)
- Coordinates: 53.3928°N 6.5078°E
- Country: Netherlands
- Province: Groningen
- Municipality: Het Hogeland

Area
  - Total: 0.55 km^{2} (0.21 sq mi)
- Elevation: 1.6 m (5.2 ft)

Population (2021)
  - Total: 365
  - Density: 660/km^{2} (1,700/sq mi)
- Time zone: UTC+1 (CET)
  - Summer (DST): UTC+2 (CEST)
- Postal code: 9956
- Dialing code: 0595

Den Andel is a village in the municipality Het Hogeland which is part of the province Groningen in the Netherlands. It is located about 20 kilometres (12 mi) north of the city of Groningen near the Wadden Sea coast.

== History ==
The village was first mentioned in 1475 as Ondel, and means alkali grass (Puccinellia). Den Andel is a dike village which developed in the Middle Ages as linear settlement along the dike and a road (Streekweg) which was built at right angles from the dike.

The Dutch Reformed church is a single aisled church with a detached tower. The church dates from 1224. The tower probably dates from the 14th century. The church was scheduled to be demolished in 1989, however it has remained and is used for cultural activities.

The grist and peeling mill (peeling is removing the husk from the grain) De Jonge Hendrik dates from 1875. It was restored in 1972, but the windmill peeled for the last time in 29 January 1983 and stopped grinding in July 1998. Between 2006 and 2007, it was restored and it is often in service.

Den Andel was home to 244 people during the 1795 census, and received a combined seat with Eenrum in the States of Groningen. Up to the 1960s, it was a thriving village with 2 schools, 2 churches and retail. The school closed in 2015. As of 2022, there is a village house which has a snack bar and pub, and a second-hand store.

== Gallery ==
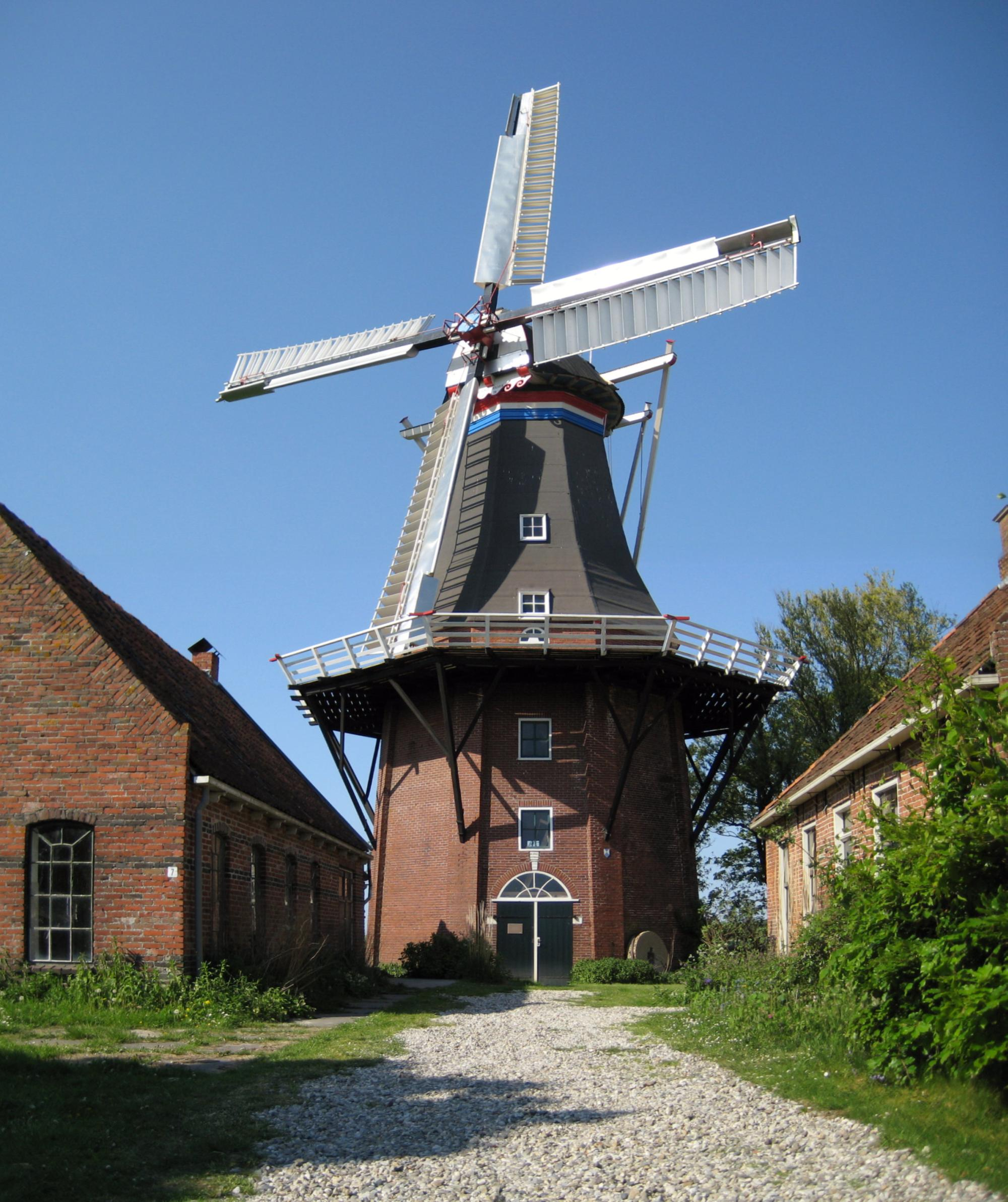
Windmill De Jonge Hendrik

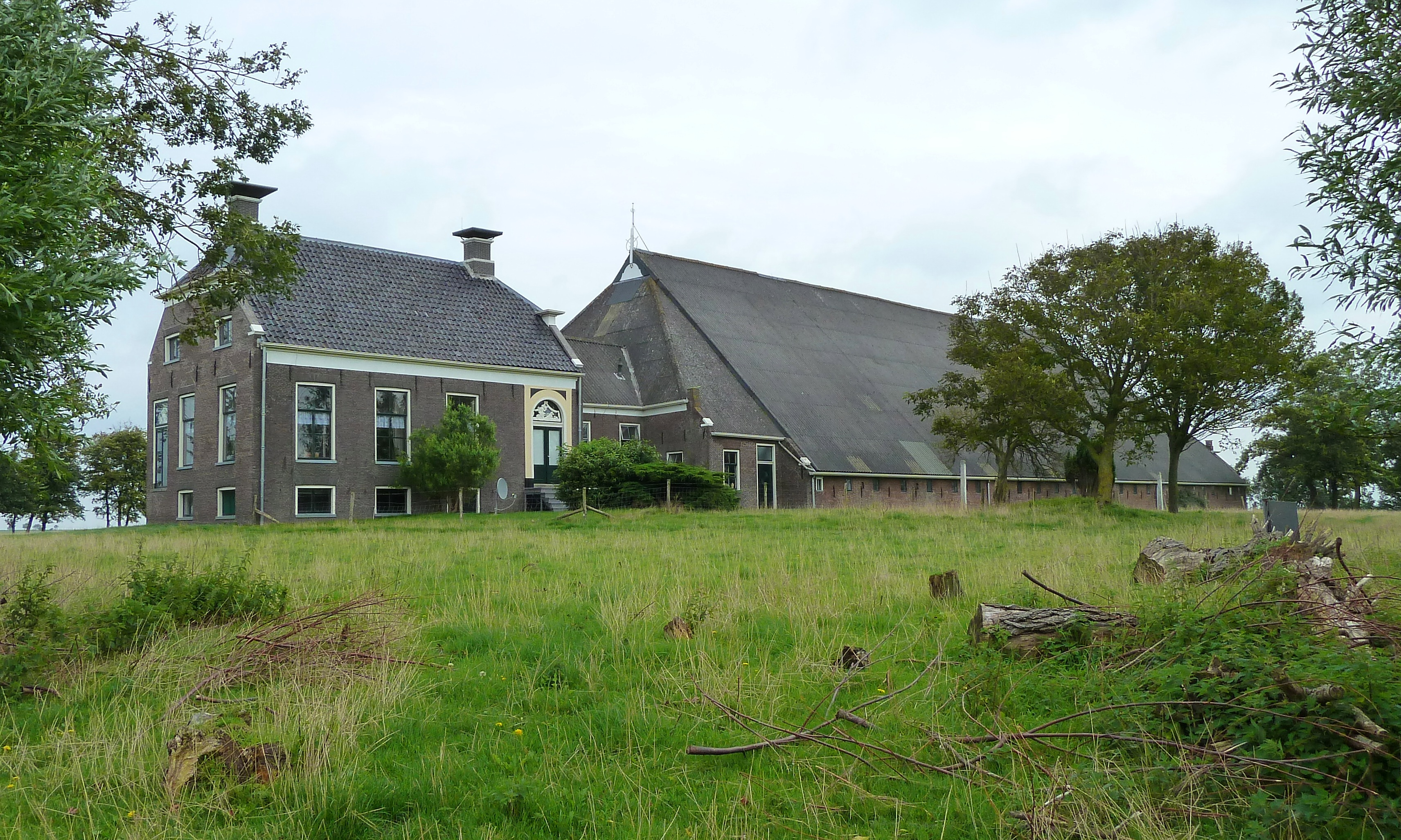
Farm Arion in Den Andel

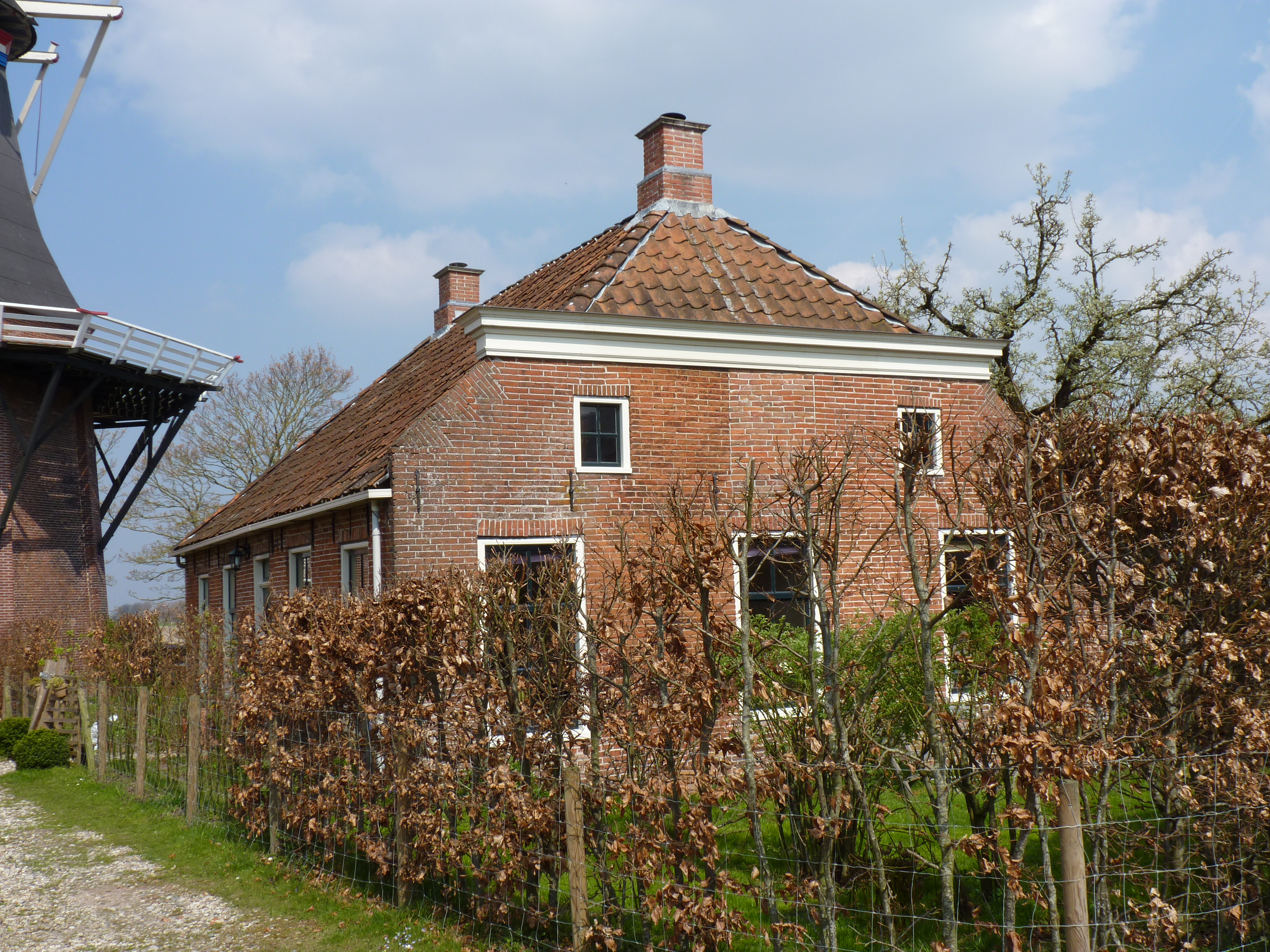
Sarrieshut (taxation officer residence)

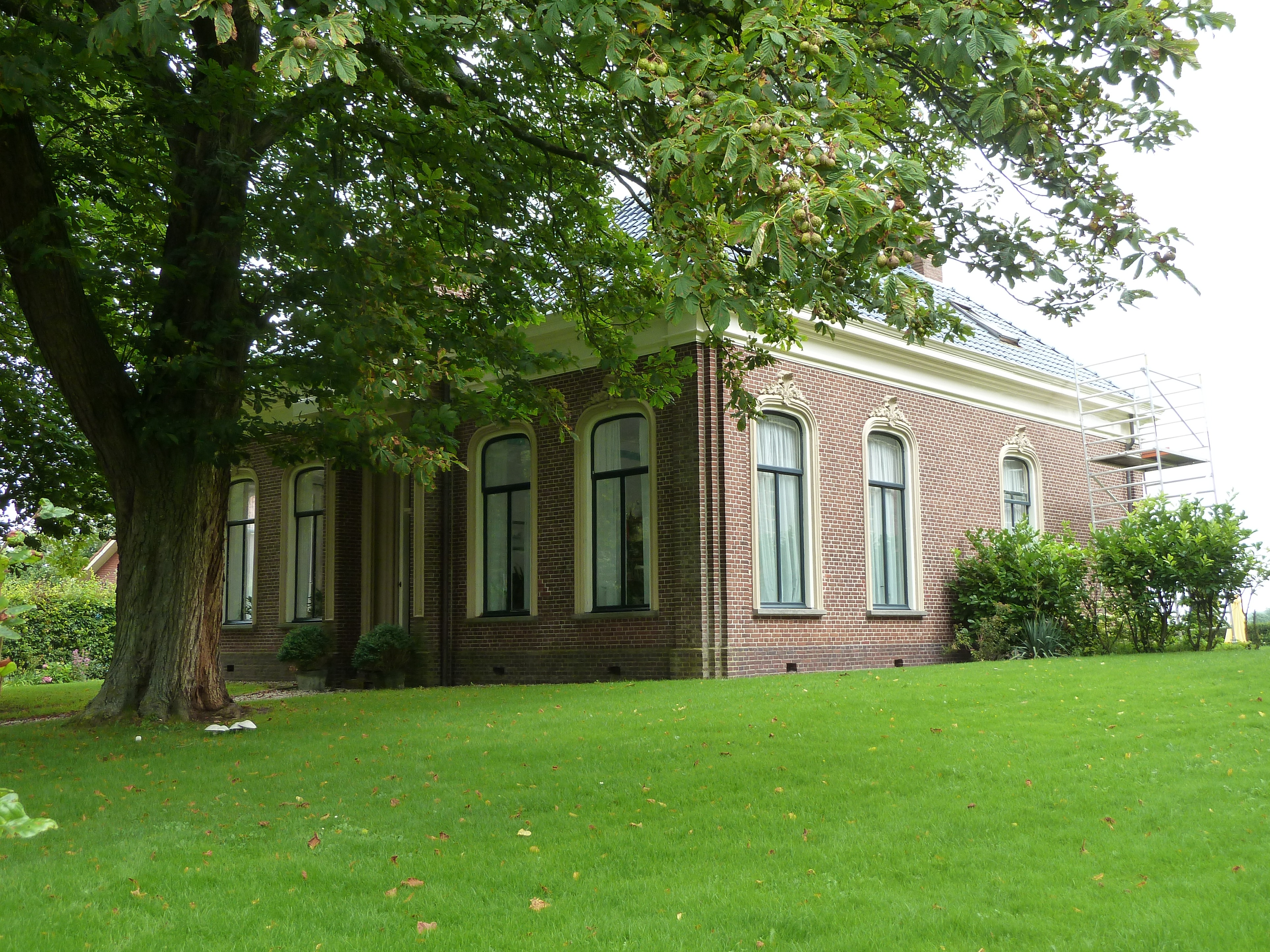
Clergy house
