= Ludgerus church (Oldehove) =

Romanesque-Gothic Dutch church from the 13th century

Coordinates: 53°18′15″N 6°23′37″E

Ludgeruskerk or Liudgerkerk is a church located in Oldehove, Groningen, a village in the north of the Netherlands. It is a Romanesque-Gothic structure from the Middle Ages, dedicated to Ludger.

== Description ==
The single-nave church was constructed in the 13th century and was originally vaulted. The facade on the north side has almost entirely survived the centuries. The gable roof tower dates back to the 15th century. Both the church and the tower underwent renovation in 1664, using demolition materials from the Aduard Abbey. During this renovation, the tower received a classical entrance portal.

The tower of the church was requisitioned by the government during the Napoleonic era, in the early 19th century, to use it for military communication purposes. The system was known as the optical telegraph. Since then, the tower has been the property of local government (Westerkwartier municipality).

Inside the church, the pulpit and the lord's benches are from the 17th century. Beneath the church are two burial vaults. One of these vaults contains the tomb of Countess Margaretha von Cobentzel from Vienna, who died around 1730. She was the wife of a member of the Ripperda family. There is also a memorial stone dedicated to the brothers Douwe and Aedsge Martens Teenstra, who drained nearby land known as the Ruigezandsterpolder in 1794 (a typical Dutch polder).

The church organ, installed in 1903, was built by Van Oeckelen and underwent restoration in 1971 by the firm Mense Ruiter.

On March 1, 2013, the church's ownership was transferred to the Stichting Oude Groninger Kerken (Old Churches Foundation in Groningen).
