= Links rechts =

Song by Snollebollekes

from the album ...En door
- Released: 2015
- Genre: dance-pop
- Length: 2:40
- Label: Berk Music
- Songwriters: Maurice Huismans; Jurjen Gofers

Links rechts (English: Left Right) is a song by Dutch party act Snollebollekes. The song was released in 2015 as the official anthem of the Sensation Waailand festival in Made, Netherlands. In 2017, the song was included in the compilation album, "...En door ."

The song is widely used in numerous music festivals in the Netherlands and in sporting events the country participates in. In 2024, it gained widespread popularity through viral videos of Netherlands national football team supporters during UEFA Euro 2024 and at the 2026 Solheim Cup final.

== Background and releases ==
Links rechts was written by group members Maurice Huismans and Jurjen Gofers. The song was originally written as the theme song for the 2015 edition of the Sensation Waailand festival in the North Brabant town of Made, where it had the initial title of "Hakken, beuken, springen" (English: Dancing, punching, jumping). This version proved to be popular with the audience, prompting the group to release a full version of the song as a single entitled "Links rechts".

In 2017, the song gained notable attention after fans of football club NAC Breda started to celebrate to the song while it was being played inside the stadium. The same year also saw the club earn promotion to the top-flight Eredivisie and the song being used by supporters of the Netherlands women's national football team during UEFA Women's Euro 2017, which was hosted in the country.

Links rechts is a popular song during the annual Snollebollekes concerts at the GelreDome in Arnhem and the annual Total Loss Festival in Best, as the audience is encouraged to jump from left to right during the chorus. The song frequently lands in the Dutch Single Top 100 during the country's carnival season, peaking at number 61 in 2022. A new version of the song was created for UEFA Euro 2020, and was used in an advertising campaign by supermarket chain Jumbo.

The song is also frequently used during Formula 1's Dutch Grand Prix in support of Dutch racing driver Max Verstappen of Red Bull Racing.

Viral videos of Dutch supporters in Germany jumping to the song circulated during UEFA Euro 2024, which gave the song widespread popularity. The videos featured Dutch supporters near the competition venues dancing and jumping. In an interview with CNN, lead singer Rob Kemps said, "I call it "The Orange Madness", so everybody wants to be a part of it. I think that's the power also from the song and also from the hype right now. When you see it, you want to be a part of that." The song is frequently played in fan marches and tailgate parties hosted at the Dutch Orange Bus with Snollebollekes having performed on the bus occasionally.

During the 2024 Summer Olympics in Paris, Links rechts was played at the Parc Urbain after the Netherlands won the gold medal in the men's 3x3 basketball tournament. It was also used during events with Dutch medalists. A video from the Olympic Village showed Dutch athletes dancing to the song with King Willem-Alexander and Queen Máxima, members of the Dutch royal family.

On 30 January 2026, Links rechts received a Diamond Award for reaching 50 million streams, with Rob Kemps accepting the award on behalf of the party act during a broadcast of Evers & Co on Radio 538.

== Versions ==
Owing to its popularity in Germany during UEFA Euro 2024, a German version of the song was released during the tournament on June 25, 2024, featuring German disc jockey DJ Robin and singer Ikke Hüftgold. In anticipation of the 2026 FIFA World Cup in Canada, Mexico, and the United States, Snollebollekes released an English version of Links rechts and a "jumbo version" of the song featuring multiple languages, with modified lyrics for the World Cup.

== Charts ==
Chart (2022)	Peak position
Dutch Single Top 100	61
