= Snollebollekes =

Dutch party act

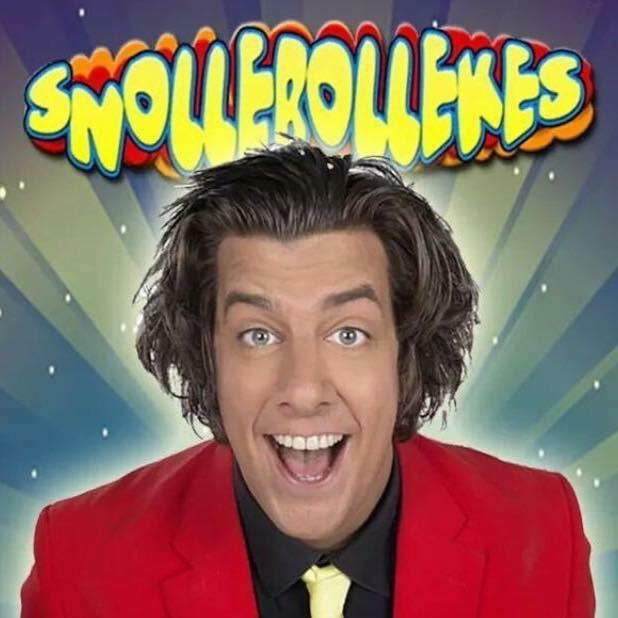
- Rob Kemps on a Snollebollekes poster

Background information
- Origin: Best, Netherlands
- Genres: Carnavalskraker, Après-ski
- Years active: 2013-present
- Label: Berk Music
- Members: Rob Kemps; Jurjen Gofers; Maurice Huismans
- Website: https://www.snollebollekes.com/

Snollebollekes is a Dutch party act from Best, North Brabant, established in 2013 with comedian Rob Kemps being the face of the group, alongside DJs Jurjen Gofers and Maurice Huismans (DJ Maurice). They are best known for their 2015 song "Links rechts".

== History ==
Kemps participated in the Dutch comedy talent show Lama Gezocht in 2007, a spin-off of then popular television programme De Lama's. Party act Snollebollekes was established in the city of Best in 2013. As part of a joke, Snollebollekes subsequently went to Radio Veronica to perform their Low Franconian carnival party song "Vrouwkes". The song unexpectedly reached #11 on the Dutch sales chart Single Top 100. One year later, the group released "Snollebolleke", which almost topped the Belgian Ultratop 50, reaching #2.

The act first proved popular in areas where carnival is celebrated widely in the Netherlands, such as North Brabant, Limburg and certain parts of Gelderland and Twente. The group was recognised as a household name in the whole country after they managed to sell out their Gelredome concert within 20 minutes in early 2019. Snollebollekes also received their own tile on the Walk of Fame in front of the main entrance of GelreDome. That same year Snollebollekes played two nights in the Johan Cruijff ArenA during the concerts of De Toppers.

That same year, a King's Day performance of the group in Breda, North Brabant, went viral as tens of thousands of spectators danced in sync to the group's 2015 hit song "Links rechts". Ground tremors from the performance could be felt in nearby homes. During UEFA Euro 2024, videos of Dutch fans dancing to Links rechts in the streets of Hamburg went viral.

== Style ==
The music can be defined as carnavalskraker and après-ski, but Kemps himself has described the music as "a combination of modern sound with hoempapa".
