= Fanwalk =

Fanwalk or fan walk, is the practice of association football fans walking as a large group to and from the stadium. In European football, they are often escorted by police and security personnel to prevent violent incidents involving ultras. English and Scandinavian football fans are particularly well known for their fanwalks. Notable examples at Euro 2024 include the fanwalk by the Dutch Orange Bus, supporters of the Netherlands national football team in Leipzig, which drew between 20,000 and 25,000 fans wearing orange jerseys and hats.

The concept of the fanwalk became popular during the 2010 FIFA World Cup in South Africa. The pedestrian route from central Cape Town to the Cape Town Stadium at Green Point, referred to as the Fanwalk, was carefully designed to promote local businesses while promoting crowd safety and creating a festive atmosphere. An estimated 580,000 people experienced the fan walk at the 2010 World Cup.

== See also ==
- Fan zone
- Olympic Way
