= Dutch Orange Bus =

Bus owned and used by Dutch national football supporters

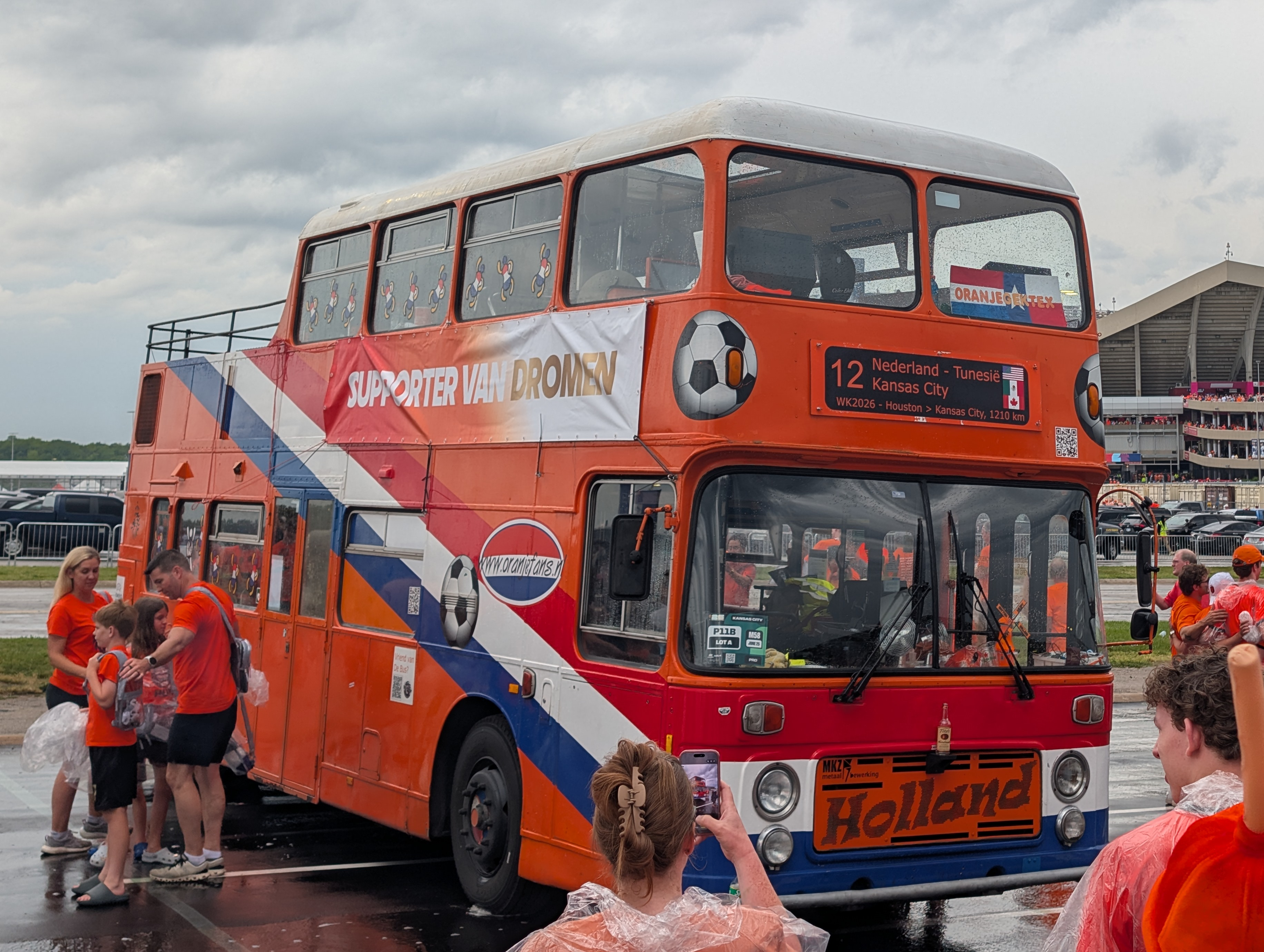
The Dutch Orange Bus outside Kansas City Stadium prior to the 2026 Tunisia vs Netherlands World Cup match

The Dutch Orange Bus (Dutch: De Oranjebus) is a bright orange Bristol VRT double-decker bus exported from England which leads fanwalks and tailgate parties for the Netherlands men's national football team and the Netherlands women's football team. It has been to five FIFA World Cups and the 2019 FIFA Women's World Cup.

Events that the Dutch Orange Bus hosts draw crowds of tens of thousands of Dutch football fans. Songs such as Links rechts are frequently played during fan marches.

The bus is sponsored by DHL Global Forwarding which performs the logistics to move the bus internationally via ship freighting services. The association is also sponsored by Staatsloterij.

Frans Peeters is the driver of the Dutch Orange Bus since inception.

== Bus specifications and maintenance ==
The bus is a 1980 rear-engined Eastern Coach Works bodied Bristol VRT/SL3, originally new to National Bus Company subsidiary Cumberland Motor Services in Cumbria, England as fleet number 423 and registration FAO 423V; it was re-registered BJ-DH-95 upon export to the Netherlands. The top level has been modified with a sound system and the roof partially removed.

The physical Destination sign is used to indicate the city of the current or next match the bus. Much of the interior is covered with artificial turf as a form of carpet.

In 2021, the bus received a re-manufactured Gardner 6LXB engine and gearbox.

== History ==
=== Purchase ===
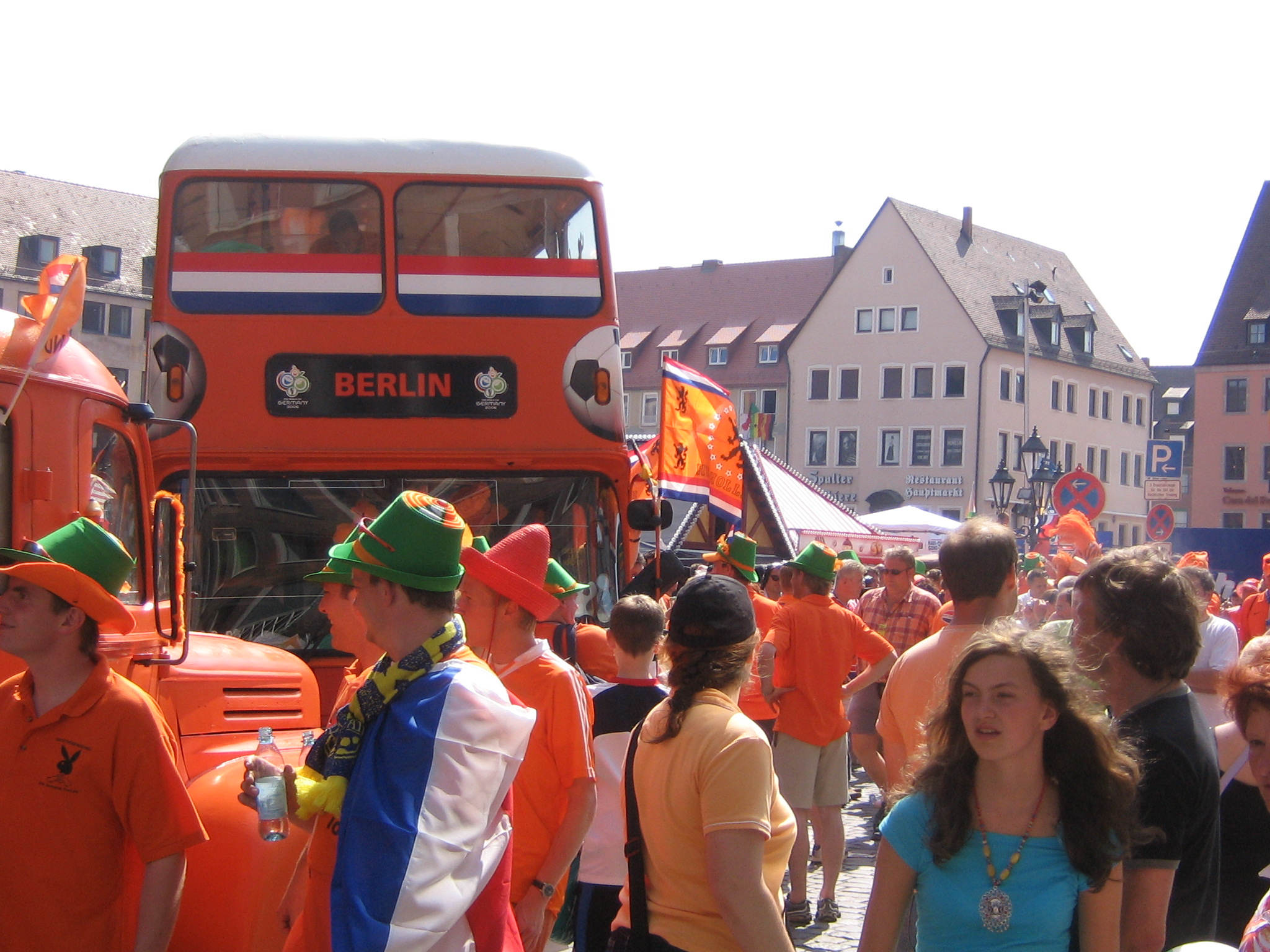
The Dutch Orange Bus in Nürnburg, Germany in 2006

The bus started as a joke to purchase a British bus and paint it orange for UEFA Euro 2004 in Portugal. On 16 March 2004, a purchase agreement was signed to acquire the bus. The association was founded prior to the championship.

=== 2010 World Cup - South Africa ===
For the 2010 FIFA World Cup, the bus led the Orange Convoy (Dutch: Oranje-karavaan) on Wednesday 15 June 2010 from Pretoria to Durban. Hundreds of rented camper trucks followed in convey, and it stretched over 6 kilometres (3.7 mi).

=== 2014 World Cup - Brazil ===
During the 2014 FIFA World Cup, the rear driveshaft broke near Belo Horizonte, rendering the bus unable to continue.

=== 2026 World Cup - United States and Mexico ===
For the 2026 FIFA World Cup, the bus has been modified to operate with the North American voltage of 110 V. It boarded a boat on 15 April 2026. 27 days later, the bus arrived in the United States in Galveston, Texas. For this World Cup, the bus received temporary Texas registration plate TMP86KMB.

In Houston, the bus suffered a broken thermostat, preventing coolant water from circulating properly. This almost caused an engine failure.

In Kansas City, over 22,000 people attended the fanwalk.

The bus then drove over 1,700 kilometres (1,100 mi) from Kansas City to Monterrey, Mexico for the knockout stage match against Morocco. In the afternoon of Sunday 28 June, the bus entered Mexico where they were greeted by the governor of Nuevo Leon Samuel García.
