= Carnival in the Netherlands =

Dutch festival

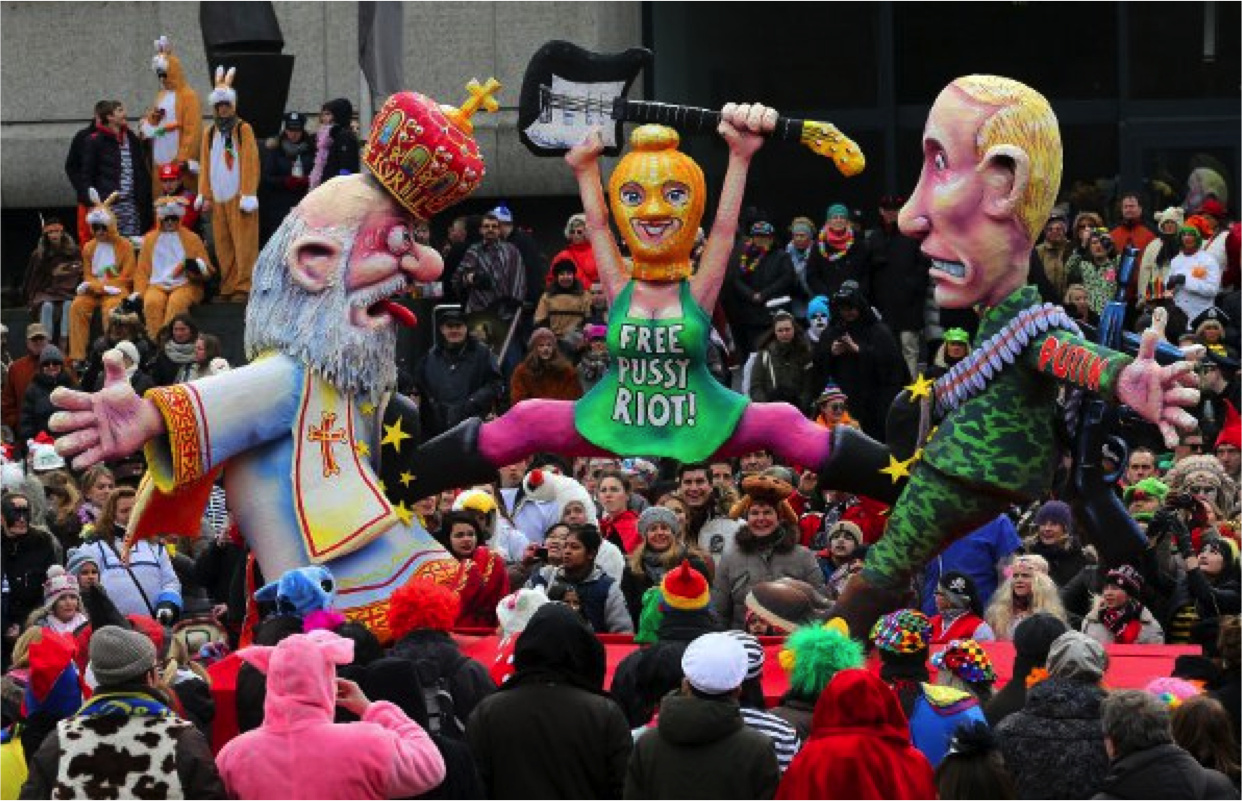
Carnaval 2013: Carnaval parades often emphasize ridiculing and social criticism

Carnival in the Netherlands (Dutch: Carnaval; also called "vastenavond" – eve of the fasting or Limburgish: "vastelaovend") is a festival held mainly in the Southern and Eastern regions of the Netherlands with an emphasis on role-reversal and the suspension of social norms, as part of celebrations of Carnival. The feast was assimilated by the Catholic Church, taking elements from ancient pagan spring festivals and is celebrated in the three days preceding the Christian holidays of Ash Wednesday and Lent.

From an anthropological point of view, Carnival is a reversal ritual, in which social roles are reversed and norms about desired behavior are suspended. Winter was thought of as the reign of the winter spirits that were to be driven out for summer to return. Carnival can thus be regarded as a rite of passage from darkness to light, from winter to summer: a fertility celebration, the first spring festival of the new year.

It precedes the Christian penitential season of Lent. The first day of Carnaval is six weeks before Easter Sunday. Carnival officially begins on Sunday and lasts three days until the start of Lent's first day, Ash Wednesday, at midnight. Nowadays the celebrations often start on Thursday evening though, which makes it in practice a six-day celebration. Many people in modern times do not relate the holiday at all with religion, but its date is still set before the start of the Christian season of Lent.

In the southern part of the Netherlands (Limburg and North Brabant) during Carnival, normal daily life comes to a near stop. Roads are temporarily blocked and many local businesses close for the week because many employees take days off during and after Carnival. According to post-Napoleon tradition, the feast lasts from Sunday until Tuesday. In recent years the feast usually starts on Saturday. Also Friday evening (or at schools at Friday afternoon) and in some places Thursday (Ouwe Wijven) are considered the start of Carnival, which makes it a six days' celebration. The festivities last the entire day and well into the nights. Some parades and many balls and bonte avonden or other meetings are held in the weeks before the official Carnival, but never before the first official court meeting on 11 November. 11 is considered the fools' number, so 11-11 (De elfde van de elfde) at 11:11(:11) is a prominent moment. Historically the 40 days of Lent would start on Wednesday at midnight and continue until Easter. Nowadays it is still the official ending of Carnival, though some Carnival activities such as herring eating are traditionally held on Wednesday after Carnival. 20 days into Lent there might be another parade or festivities, called "Half-Vasten" (Half-Lent). Lent itself is generally not practiced anymore by the Southern Dutch population as a result of irreligion dominating the area nowadays.

== Name origin ==
The oldest word which points in the direction of the word "Carnival" is listed on a certificate from the Italian Subiaco from 965 CE as a timestamp Carnelevare. Also known from the 13th century are the words Carnisprivialis, Carnis Privium and in an old Liège text the term Quarnivalle.

The origin can be traced to the Latin expression Carne Levare, or Italian Carne lavare or Carnem levare which with reasonable certainty can be translated into "farewell to the flesh" or "taking away the flesh", which was a ritual to prelude lent. Two other, less likely, explanations that the term would be a contraction of the Latin Carne (meat) and Paler (rule), literally "the time that meat reigns" and the Italian Carnueale or the French Carne Avalis (both mean so much as "devour flesh") are given as well.

== Dates ==
Easter can fall on 22 March at the earliest and on 25 April at the latest. As a result, the earliest possible Carnival is on 1 February, the latest possible date is 9 March.

The official Carnival dates for the coming years are:

- 2026: 15 to 17 February
- 2027: 7 to 9 February
- 2028: 27 to 29 February
- 2029: 11 to 13 February
- 2030: 3 to 5 March
- 2031: 23 to 25 February
- 2032: 8 to 10 February
- 2033: 27 February to 1 March
- 2034: 19 to 21 February
- 2035: 4 to 6 February

== Origin ==
=== Pre-Christian celebrations ===
Traditionally a Carnival feast was the last opportunity to eat well before the time of food shortage at the end of the winter during which one was limited to the minimum necessary. On what nowadays is called vastenavond (the days before fasting) all the remaining winter stores of lard, butter and meat which were left would be eaten, for it would soon start to rot and decay. The selected livestock had in fact already been slaughtered in November and the meat would be no longer preservable. All the food that had survived the winter had to be eaten to assure that everyone was fed enough to survive until the coming spring would provide new food sources. Traditionally the feast also applied to sexual desires, which were supposed to be suppressed during the following fasting.

Several Germanic tribes celebrated the returning of the daylight. A predominant deity was during this jubilee driven around in a noisy procession on a ship on wheels. During this feast the Germanic people celebrated as the days grew longer again the (re-)birth of the sun. The winter would be driven out, to make sure that fertility could return in spring. A central figure was possibly the fertility goddess Nerthus. Also there are some indications that the effigy of Nerthus or Freyr was placed on a ship with wheels and accompanied by a procession of people in animal disguise and men in women's clothes. Aboard the ship would the marriage of a man and woman be consummated as a fertility ritual.

Tacitus wrote in his Germania:

Germania 9.6: Ceterum nec cohibere parietibus deos neque in ullam humani oris speciem adsimulare ex magnitudine caelestium arbitrator – "The Germans, however, do not consider it consistent with the grandeur of celestial beings to confine the gods within walls, or to liken them to the form of any human countenance."

Germania 40: mox vehiculum et vestis et, si credere velis, numen ipsum secreto lacu abluitur – "Afterwards the car, the vestments, and, if you like to believe it, the divinity herself, are purified in a secret lake."

The elaborate rites involving masked figures in the Swabian-Alemannic carnaval might have had an influence on the different aspects of the feast. The Swabian-Alemannic carnaval, known as Fastnacht, takes place in Baden and Swabia (Southwestern Germany), Switzerland, Alsace and Vorarlberg (Western Austria). It traditionally represents the time of year when the reign of the cold, grim winter spirits is over and these spirits are being driven out and expelled by the Carnaval rituals.

Also the ritual re-enactment of the Wild Hunt was a cultural phenomenon among many Gallic and Germanic peoples.

There is evidence that the ancient Roman festivals of Saturnalia and Bacchanalia may have been absorbed into the Italian carnival. The Saturnalia, in turn, may be based on the Greek Dionysia and Oriental festivals like the Babylonical Sacaea (Marduk). The pagan carnaval was celebrated throughout Europe. In Russia, for example, this festival is known as Maslenitsa (roughly translated: butter feast).

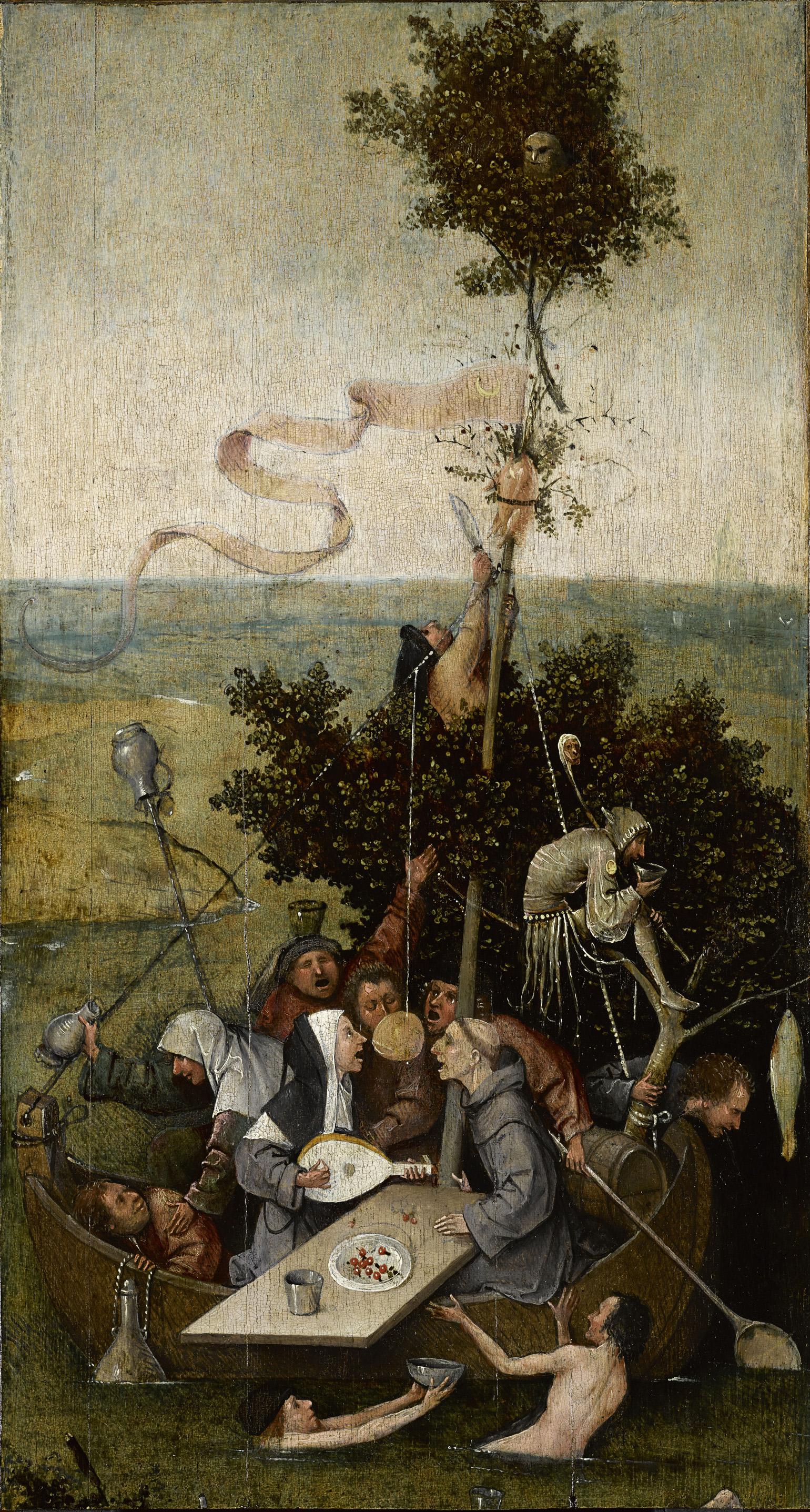
Jheronimus Bosch, The Ship of Fools, 1490

=== Christian Carnaval ===
==== Western Roman Empire and Early Middle Ages ====
While Christian festivals such as corpus christi were church-sanctioned celebrations, Carnaval was also a manifestation of European folk culture.

In the Christian tradition the fasting is to commemorate the 40 days that Jesus fasted in the desert according to the New Testament and also to reflect on Christian values. As with many other Christian festivals such as Christmas which was originally a Pagan midwinter festival, Easter which was a Pagan spring festival, and Sinterklaas, the Christian church has found it easier to turn the pagan Carnaval in a catholic tradition than to eliminate it. Unlike today, Carnaval in the Middle Ages took not just a few days, but it covered almost the entire period between Christmas and the beginning of Lent. In those two months, several Catholic holidays were seized by the Catholic population as an outlet for their daily frustrations.

In many Christian sermons and texts, the example of a vessel used to explain Christian doctrine: "the nave of the church of baptism", "the ship of Mary", etc. The writings show that processions with ship-like carts were held and lavish feasts were celebrated on the eve of lent or the greeting of spring in the early Middle Ages. The Catholic Church condemned this "devilish debauchery" and "Pagan rituals". As early as the year 325 the council of Nicaea attempted to end these Pagan festivals.

Many synods and councils attempted to set things "right". The statements of Caesarius of Arles (470–542), which protested around 500 CE in his sermons against the Pagan practices, seemed to have formed the building blocks of the Indiculus Superstitionum et Paganiarum (small index of superstitious and Pagan practices), which was drafted by the Synod of Leptines in 742 in which the Spurcalibus en Februario was condemned.

Pope Gregory the Great (590–604) decided that fasting would start on Ash Wednesday. The whole Carnaval event was set before the fasting, to set a clear division between the Pagan and the Christian custom.

It was also the custom during Carnaval that the ruling class would be mocked using masks and disguises.

In the year 743 the synod in Leptines (Leptines is located near Binche in Belgium) spoke out furiously against the excesses in the month of February. Also from the same period dates the phrase: "Whoever in February by a variety of less honorable acts tries to drive out winter is not a Christian, but a Pagan." Confession books from around 800 contain more information about how people would dress as an animal or old woman during the festivities in January and February. Noticing that on it was no small penance.

Gradually the ecclesiastical authority began to realize that the desired result could not be attained by banning the traditions, which eventually led to a degree of Christianization. The festivities became part of the liturgy and the liturgical year.

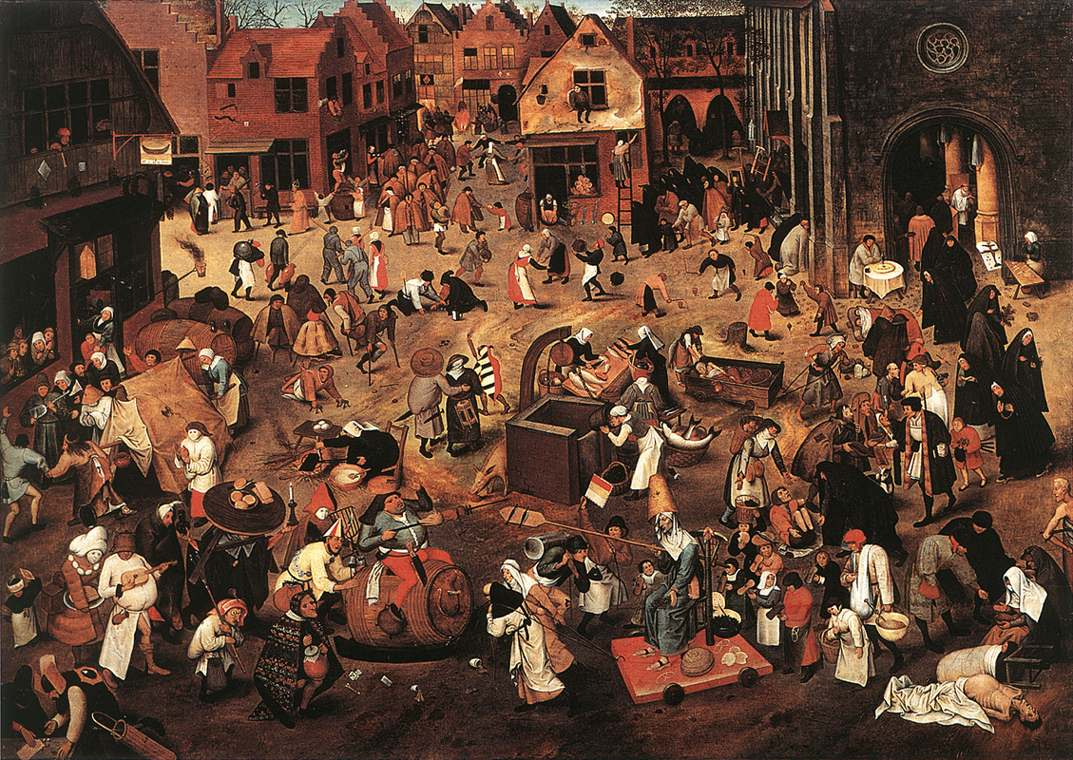
The Fight Between Carnival and Lent, Pieter Brueghel the Elder, between 1526 and 1530, The Burgundian Carnaval is depicted as the fat man with the pork on the barrel during a mock jousting battling Lent, symbolized in the skinny woman pulled on the chair across him with the fish

==== High and Late Middle Ages ====
This change of course became more clear when at the synod of Benevento (in 1091) the beginning of lent was definitively established on the day that is called Ash Wednesday by pope Urban II. The duration of the fasting was already set at 40 days after centuries of discussion preceding the council of Nicaea. Carnaval, or rather Shrove Tuesday, was officially accepted by Christianity in 1091 and was followed by Lent (the time of penance and mortification) on Ash Wednesday.

Within the confines of church liturgy, the old ways changed into the "Fools Feast" (Narrenfeest, Fêtes des Fous or Donkey Feast). The main roles were in the beginning played by the clergy of the minor orders, the sub-deacons. This were clerics who were in many cases illiterate and were also the local main baker or butcher. However, during the carnaval they became prominent and played the role of crazy bishop or "donkey pope" as part of the role reversal function of the carnaval.

From Den Bosch is according to a document from 1383 known that public stage performances, jousting tournaments, games, cockfights and role dressing were organized. Around 1400 it was prohibited to roll dice (gambling), but an exception was made during carnaval. This appears from a letter from the council of Maastricht in 1405. The ban was temporarily lifted and people were allowed to play dice during the carnaval.

Several popes in the past were explicitly involved with the shrove Tuesday celebration. They organized synods regarding fasting and shrove Tuesday, participated with carts in the processions, and promulgated special collections. Pope Martin V, elected on 11 November 1417, is known to be nicknamed "Papa Carnavale". This was not due to the fact that he was elected on 11 November to be pope, but because he felt that the carnaval didn't last long enough.

Like now the carnival in the Middle Ages reached the highlight in the three days before the beginning of lent. During this period, the city officially handed over the power to "Prince Carnaval" and the social revolution was complete. Because of the anonymity offered by the costumes, rank and position were no longer important and one could freely express his opinion and mock anything and anyone. In particular, the nobility, clergy and the wealthy citizens were mocked and ridiculed. This tradition is still reflected in contemporary parades and at the Brabantian tonproaten and Limburgish buutereednen, the speakers subjects include mocking and ridiculing the local administration.

The Catholic Church, being the most powerful and influential organisation at the time, had to suffer most during carnival. All kinds of sacred traditions and rules were ridiculed during the feast. A donkey would be put on the altar during the ezelsmis (donkey's mass) after which a civilian dressed as a priest staged a mass. During all the prayers, the "amen" would be replaced by the donkey imitation "ia, ia, ia". A dance called the polonaise was done during which people did not follow the pastor with the hand on the shoulder, but with the nose at the bottom. Also celebrated on 28 December is the now forgotten feast of the Massacre of the Innocents, commemorating the infanticide in Bethlehem. On this day the children were given the power for one day and turned it against the church. The choirboys put the clergy on a cart full of manure, and then let them pass through the village. Often this gave the mass the opportunity to pelt the church ministers with shit, a phenomenon in slightly modified version to be found now in the spreading confetti from the carnival floats.

However, in 1445 the church attacked the feast furiously. The theologians in Paris felt that the carnival was out of control, issued a number of prohibitions and drafted a letter, which included the following:

The priests wear masks during mass, they dance in the choir dressed as women, matchmakers or minstrels and singing outrageous songs. On the altar they eat black pudding and fat sausages. They roll dices and old shoes are burned instead of incense. Also there is running and jumping by them inside the church. After this mass they go out on the streets in their disguises. With carts and wagons they roam through the city, and give shameless performances to excite the laughter of the audience, which they also further incite with filthy songs and obscene gestures.

The theologians conclude their letter stating that they do not even want to mention the worst things that take place during the carnival.

The role of the lower clergy, however, gradually got taken over by laymen. That is not to say that therefore there was no longer shrove Tuesday or fools bishops, and donkey popes and donkey bishops. The laity started to play the roles of the dignitaries they ridiculed. Later this practice developed into real titles and the roles of "Prins" or "Vorst" came into use. The feasts with jesters were in Flanders and the Netherlands very widespread.

Later the "feasts of fools" are taken over by urban carnival associations, such as the shipping companies and guilds. The celebrations became more expensive every year, so expensive that even the Prins or Vorst candidate often fled the city to prevent being elected. Cities even increased their taxes to finance these highly elaborate feasts.

Also early as the Late Middle Ages charivaris occurred during the carnaval more than usual.

The oldest-known Dutch carnaval images date from 1485 in Den Bosch. They are depicted in several paintings by 15th-century painter Jheronimus Bosch.

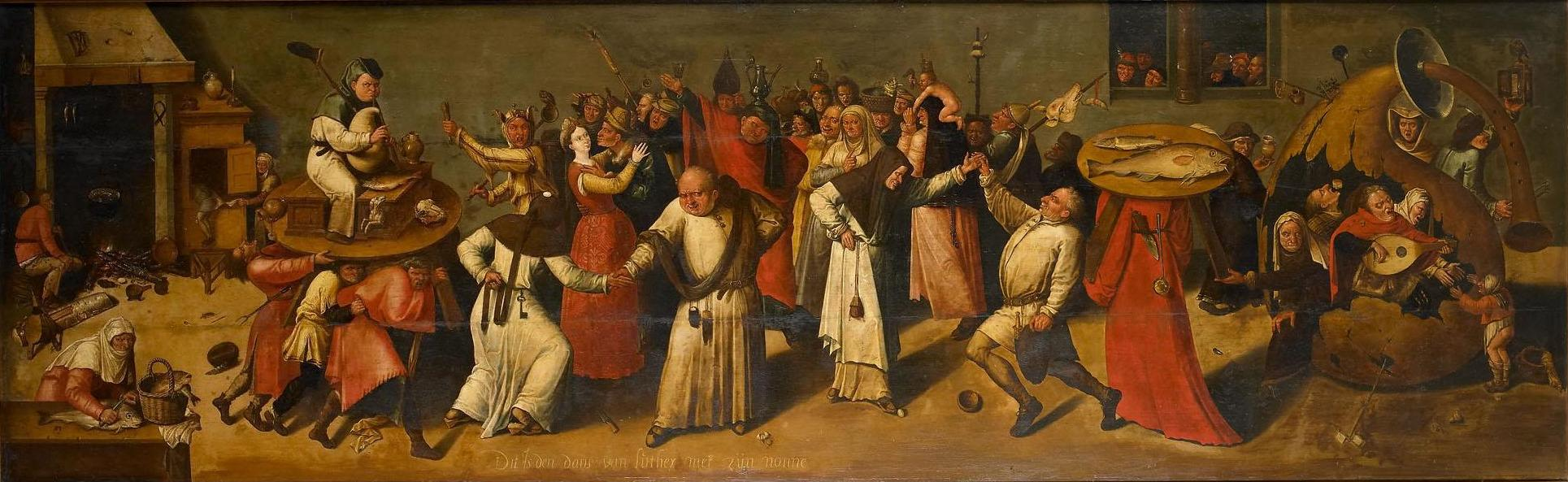
The Burgundian Carnaval depicted by a follower of Jheronimus Bosch, c.1600 – c.1620, The man on the table with the bagpipes depicting Carnaval, The lady bringing the plate of fishes towards the kitchen on the left representing the approaching of lent, and the people in between celebrating before the fasting begins.

==== Early Modern Period ====
In the sixteenth century, public and massive carnaval celebration from the Middle Ages came to an end. The council of Trent (1545–1563) and the reformation caused a complete reverse in attitude towards the carnaval. The schism within Christianity as a result of the reformation, led to a religious divide in the territory of the present Netherlands. Protestantism became the dominant religion north of the rivers Meuse and Rhine. In the areas that cover today the provinces of Limburg and North Brabant the Catholic religion remained dominant. In the part of the Netherlands that after the reformation became predominantly Protestant, the public shrovetide celebration disappeared from the streets. The new Protestant clergy found the riotous Catholic carnaval sinful. In the north, the feast quickly eradicated and also in the south the carnaval was restricted. Shrove Tuesday was interpreted as a "romish" superstition and prohibited to ban it out. In 's-Hertogenbosch e.g. the carnaval was banned in 1629 after Protestants had conquered the city which had belonged to the Roman Catholic Spaniards. By the end of the 17th century carnaval in the Netherlands had mostly disappeared, though smaller festivities before lent in the south of the Netherlands and in German Rhineland and North Rhine-Westphalia kept some carnaval traditions alive over the next 150 years. In the Catholic south the feast became less celebrated as well during the seventeenth and eighteenth century. Though the celebrations were banned, they did not entirely disappear. This is clear from the fact that a new ban had to be enacted every year. Despite the Protestant rule, the Catholics in the 18th century managed to celebrate some sort of street carnaval. There were still dressing, eating and drinking feasts and all sorts of games were held like goose pulling / rooster smashing (smashing or pulling the head of the animal), cat burning/smashing, ray stabbing, wolf hunting and herring biting. These games were held in both the 18th and in the 19th century. In Venlo these games were banned in 1775, but in Wijnandsrade this tradition was held till 1848. Also sketches and plays were held. It was only since 1794, the beginning of the French era, that Den Bosch would officially allow celebrating carnaval again. In Den Bosch a large effigy named Knillis would be burned as a typical carnaval ritual, until this was prohibited around 1853.

Also charivaris, which were folk customs that may already existed before 1600, were more often held around the carnaval time. Like in other European countries, the two main purposes of the charivari in Europe were to facilitate change in the current social structure and to act as a form of censure within the community. The goal was to enforce social standards and to rid the community of socially unacceptable relationships that threatened the stability of the whole. By the charivaris the community would punish and correct fellow citizens by public mocking and humiliation for unwanted behavior like adulterous relationships, men who let themselves be deceived by their wives, men who abused their wives, men who were not dominant in the marriage, widows who wished to remarry, women who wish to marry outside the social group (like a partner from a neighboring village) and other violators of social norms. The victims were subjected to humiliating processions with noise and music through the village, forced to do embarrassing or hard labor or their possessions and house would be marked, damaged and soiled. In the period before the carnaval, groups of men would build a carnaval float, while others painted portraits of promiscuous girls, girls of which the boys / men felt had come to age to get married, or women who behaved "wrongly". Another widespread phenomenon in the south was the Dwaze Maagd van het Jaar (foolish maiden of the year). This girl was chosen because of "bad" behavior: often a maid that was sexually used by her master. A large doll to depict the girl was shown on the Sunday of the carnaval after church. The men sang mocking songs on the town square around the doll. Not just "premarital sexual active" and "adulterous" girls were mocked, also girls could get criticized because of their appearance or language, for turning down suitors, for the extent to which she was kind or kept faithful to her friends. Men would write poetry parodies (often using already existing melodies) about these women. During the carnaval the men would wear masks and go from pub to pub to perform a play and mocking songs, while the paintings were displayed as an illustration. Much more often than in southern European countries like France, the Dutch charivaris showed dissatisfaction towards decisions of the authorities. This kind of "political charivaris" never questioned the authority of the government itself, but were intended to denounce abuse of power and corruption by the government. The heyday of the political charivaris was between 1820 and 1850. In North Brabant there were various forms of community charivaris around carnaval which till 1934 still often occurred.

Only since the beginning of the 19th century, when the Netherlands was under French rule, the carnaval feast started to revive in the south of the Netherlands.

==== Revival ====
Some of the best-known traditions, including carnival parades and masquerade balls and masquerading, were recorded in medieval Italy. The carnival of Venice was for a long time the most famous carnival (although Francis I abolished it in 1797 and only in 1959 the tradition was restored). From Italy carnival traditions spread to the Catholic nations of Spain, Portugal, and France. From France it spread to New France in North America (the Mardi Gras). From Spain and Portugal, it spread with Catholic colonization to the Caribbean and Latin America. In the early 19th century the weakened medieval tradition started to revive as well in the German Rhineland and Southern Netherlands. In 1823 the first modern carnaval parade took place in Cologne, Rhineland, Germany.

Without denying that the current carnaval contains several recognizable aspects of the past, the feast as it is held today is relatively young. Carnaval as it is known today began in the postwar period. Before that, it was repressed as a result of the strong protestant influence in the country. With the exception of some places in Limburg and North Brabant, where in the nineteenth century the organization of medieval Carnaval celebrations was reviving again, the vast majority of the carnaval associations is established after World War II.

In the 1950s, with a few exceptions, the feast was still confined to the southern provinces of Limburg and North Brabant, where the majority of the population was Catholic. During the 1960s, the relatively strong demarcation between the catholic south on one side and the Calvinist west and north on the other side of the Netherlands started to diminish. According to cultural anthropologist Jef de Jager,

The upcoming protest generation saw that its desire for looser manners was honored, at least during the Carnaval days. ... Even mild criticism of the political and social system, until then painstakingly smothered by the authorities, suddenly appeared to be possible ...

For most adolescent participants the longing for personal freedom appealed most to them; thus,

Carnaval became to the South, what the Provo was to the North [of the Netherlands]. What actually happened was exactly the opposite of what had happened during the Middle Ages: a new morality was tested, not to investigate what is not allowed, but to investigate what is allowed.

Hence, De Jager believes, Carnaval was one of the developments that gave impetus to the South to more informal manners, individualization and sexual revolution and then to ontzuiling (depillarisation) and secularization.

The Carnaval exceeded in the 1970s the border that is formed by "the Great Rivers" (the Maas, the Waal and the Rhine), lost all religious connotations and became a secular feast. Also the practice of lent became rapidly extinct in the Netherlands in the 1960s and 1970s. The south of the Netherlands, which is mostly Roman Catholic by tradition is now largely secular in practice.

After the modern feast of carnaval lost the association with Christian religion as a result of the rapid secularization in the Netherlands in the second half of the 20th century, the carnaval became more celebrated in parts of the country which were Protestant by tradition. At the end of the twentieth century there were carnaval associations in all the provinces of the Netherlands which are active in organizing the celebrations. However, in the areas which did not originally celebrate, the feast is still growing to become a tradition. As a result, the carnaval in these parts of the country usually lasts only one day with the emphasis on role dressing and feasting, without the social criticism, parades and months of prelude. The massive carnaval festivities, which suspend the daily life, still mainly take place in North Brabant, Limburg, Twente and the municipalities of Hulst, Sluis, Nijmegen, Over-Betuwe, Lingewaard, De Liemers and Arnhem.

Carnaval officially lasts from Sunday to Tuesday, but the current practice is that often there are numerous Carnaval festivities between 11 November and the actual feast, especially in the last weeks before carnaval. Sometimes there are also on Ash Wednesday some carnaval activities held. The post-Christian carnaval consist of several days consecutively drinking, feasting, role-dressing, social criticizing and mocking, parades and music. Also specific carnaval traditions and customs which may vary from town to town are an important part of the modern carnaval. The ridiculing and socially critical aspects of the carnaval are mostly emphasized during the parades. Southern schools often dedicate the Friday afternoon before the actual feast to the carnaval. Children are invited to come role-dressed to school, sometimes the schools even organize a school parade and choose a school prince. Though some people take the Carnaval traditions very seriously, many people nowadays keep it simple and just drink, sing and dance wearing a colourful outfit.

On 11 November (the eleventh of the eleventh), at exactly 11:11 am, starts the carnaval season. In the Netherlands, the start of the season is celebrated in almost every carnaval celebrating town with some kind of ceremony. The reason for this date is the number 11, which is traditionally the number of fools and madmen.

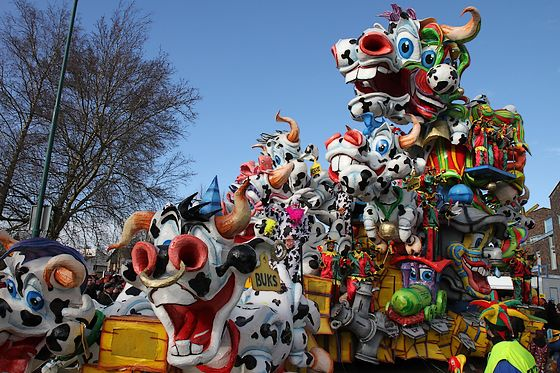
Carnaval 2013 Netherlands

=== Kinds of Carnaval ===
In the Netherlands there are two kinds of Carnaval: the Rhenish carnaval and the Burgundian carnaval.

The Carnavals are in many ways similar, but because of their origins and unique traditions they are also easy to distinguish from each other. The Rhenish variant is usually celebrated in Limburg, the Burgundian variant in the north, mid and west of North Brabant, Gelderland, Twente and in parts of Zeeland and in Utrecht. The east of North Brabant (where East Brabantian is spoken) has manifestations of both types of carnaval and forms an overlap region of the two types of carnaval, but is often classified as Burgundian. The Rhenish carnaval in the Netherlands is a derivative of the Cologne carnaval. The Burgundian carnaval originated from the traditional eating feasts during which people would ridicule one another during the carnaval in the Southern Netherlands (nowadays Belgium, Luxembourg and the Dutch Provinces North Brabant and Limburg), especially in the Duchy of Brabant.

== Carnaval customs ==
=== Role reversal and role dressing ===
Carnaval is not only a feast of eating and drinking, but also serves as social role reversal feast which allows people to behave outside the usual acceptable social norm. People will dress up as a character, much as seen during the eve of the Christian feast of All Hallows that appears in the Celtic and Anglo-Saxon culture, which though has developed from a different origin. During the Dutch carnaval people will often dress colourful and take on roles like jesters, occupations, objects, animals, the opposite gender and sex, archetypes or fairytale characters, well known people, subcultures, historical figures or foreign cultures. Masks and face paint are often used in combination with the costumes. The old tradition of wearing masks is becoming more and more replaced by the use of face paint, which makes it easier to drink and eat during the feasting. The costumes allow people to change their identity and role in society for a few days without being judged for it by their fellowman during and after the carnaval. This also applies to feasting and drinking and other licentious behaviour which can be attributed to the temporary identity one takes on, rather than to the person him or herself. The costumes may, but are often not, meant to be political incorrect, ridiculing, taboo-breaking, politically and socially and religiously critical, insulting or self-mocking, which is part of the role reversal origins of the feast. The function of this is to mirror and exaggerate daily life, to denounce and raise awareness of everyday events and put life in perspective. A proper mocking carnaval costume does not simply insult or ridicule, but makes actually a valuable point. When not used to make a point, carnaval costumes offer an opportunity to temporarily change identity and express oneself freely. Nowadays some people will have a different costume for each day they celebrate carnaval because of the lack of time to wash their clothes.

Traditionally the role dressing serves three major purposes:

- The costume allows people to become and act according to an identity they cannot take on or express during the rest of the year because of social standards and serves thus as an outlet for such needs.
- The costume offers a visual way of protesting or expressing criticism and mirroring by exaggeration of social circumstances, authority and daily life to break taboos, create awareness and reflect on past and current events.
- The costume provides protection when criticizing and ridiculing others because the wearer can either not be recognized or the criticism can be attributed to the role the wearer assumes during the carnaval rather than to the wearer himself. Because of this the wearer can safely express his criticism and opinion without having to fear for consequences in his daily life.

=== Key transfer ===
The Prince of carnaval receives on the first day of the carnaval the symbolic key to the city / town from the hands of the mayor, who transfers to him three days of "power". This element of the carnaval is already known in the medieval carnaval. The changing of positions in power provide an opportunity to criticize the authorities without fear of retribution and are part of the role reversal function of the carnaval.

=== Carnaval associations ===
Since 1839 numerous societies were established which organized carnaval balls. In fact, these associations took on many activities which the guilds used to organize in the Middle Ages and Early Modern Period before the French occupation and are in that sense their successors.

More than Rhenish, the Burgundian carnaval celebrations are dominated by carnaval associations. These associations, of which there are sometimes many per city or village with each their own prince and council of eleven, organize their own festivities for both members and non-members of the association during the carnaval. At the Burgundian carnaval the main features ("bonte avonden" and "pronkzitting", key exchange, parades, etc.) are organized by a carnaval association. The associations choose a prince (and entourage) and even though a Burgundian town can have dozens of carnaval associations, there is only one prince per city or village.

Cologne had already started organizing carnaval by an association in 1823, followed in 1835 by Düsseldorf and Mainz in 1838. In Limburg the carnaval organized by an association was as common as in the German Rhineland. Momus was probably the first carnaval association in the Netherlands and was founded in 1839 in Maastricht, followed by Jocus in the city of Venlo in 1842. Momus name derives from the Greek god Momus. According to the Düsseldorfer Narrenkalender from 1841 "Carnaval the Great has three sons: Momus, Comus and Jocus". Momus is the Greek god of mockery and criticism. When in Venlo a sorority founded the carnaval association, they could thus choose between Comus (Greek god of festivity, anarchy and chaos) and Jocus (Roman god of wit and raillery). Momus is not the oldest existing carnaval association because it had faded out before the Second World War in 1939. After the war the carnaval in Maastricht was organized by the Tempeleers. The currently oldest carnaval association is Jocus.

=== Carnaval parades ===
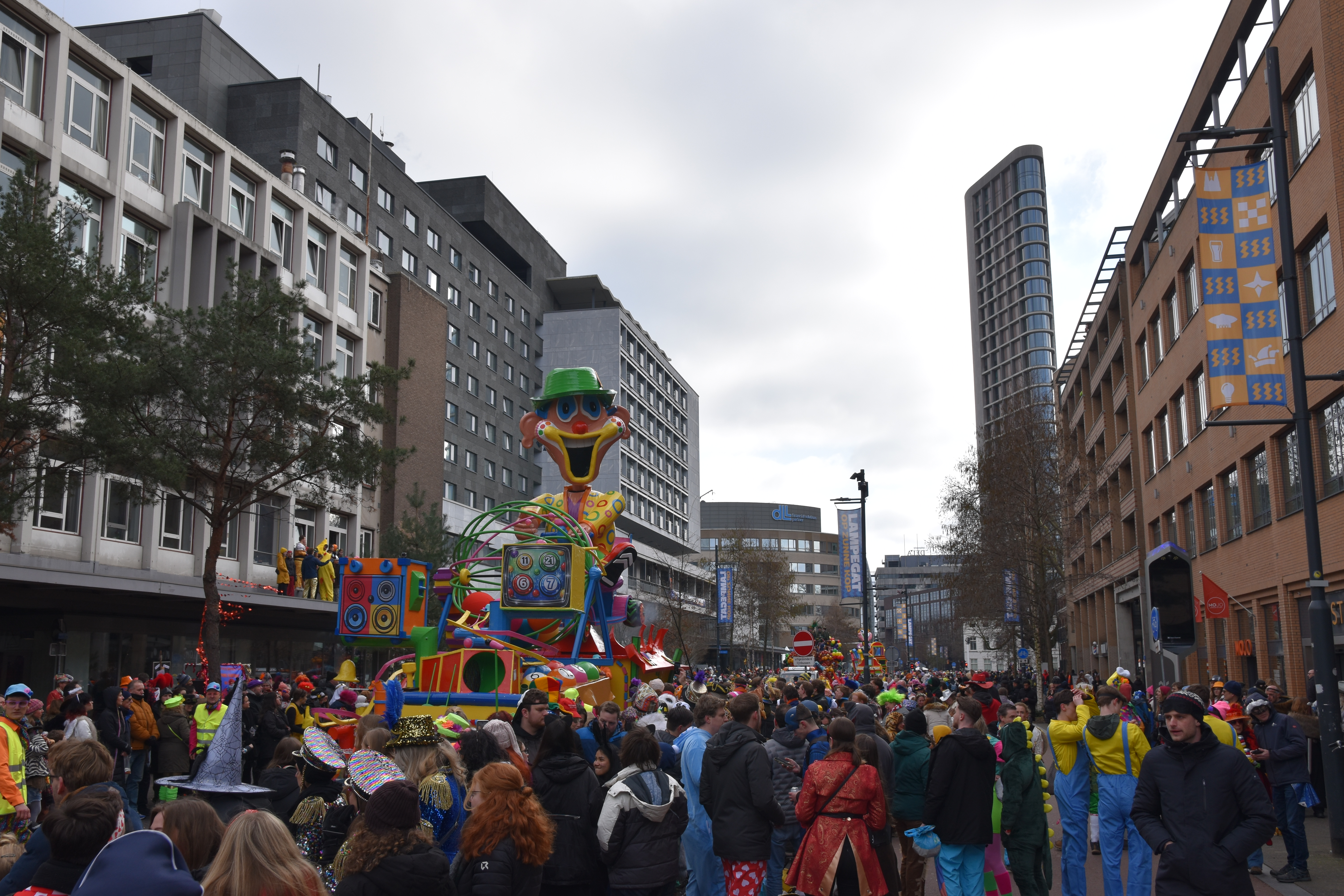
Carnaval parade in Eindhoven, 2026

In many places, large carnaval parades are held with large floats, organized and created by the carnaval associations. These are called D'n Optocht or D'n Boonte Störrem (The Motley Storm). The parades have usual a particular theme whereby authorities are ridiculed and criticized, events of the past year are represented and which are often politically incorrect and used to make people think outside the box or function as a mirror to the society. Also groups or individuals on foot will participate and fill the gaps between the carnaval wagons during the parade. Fanfares and marching bands will provide for typical carnaval music. The floats are built by carnaval associations, but also often by independent groups of friends, families, neighbourhoods or other clubs. A massive ship-looking wagon is shown in every carnaval parade which is manned by the prince, his entourage and the council of eleven of the city it is held or of the carnaval association that organized the parade and is usually the last float at the parade. Carnaval parades often start at 11.11 am and end early in the afternoon. Some wil start in the afternoon to give participants the opportunity to join several parades a day and to give the public and participants the opportunity to be somewhat more sober / less hangover after the drinking of the day before. In that case they will start at 11 past the hour as well. Usually a competition will be held to choose the most outstanding contribution to the parade with separate categories for floats, groups on foot and individual participants. Although a procession usually takes from a starting point to a point of arrival, it actually roams from nowhere to nowhere. What only matters is the social binding during the parade. Along the route, the crowd forms a very essential part of the parade. The crowd is not just spectator, they form living dikes along the carnaval river without which the parade would lose meaning.

Also separate children's parade are sometimes held which focuses not on ridiculing and criticism, but on role changing and dressing.

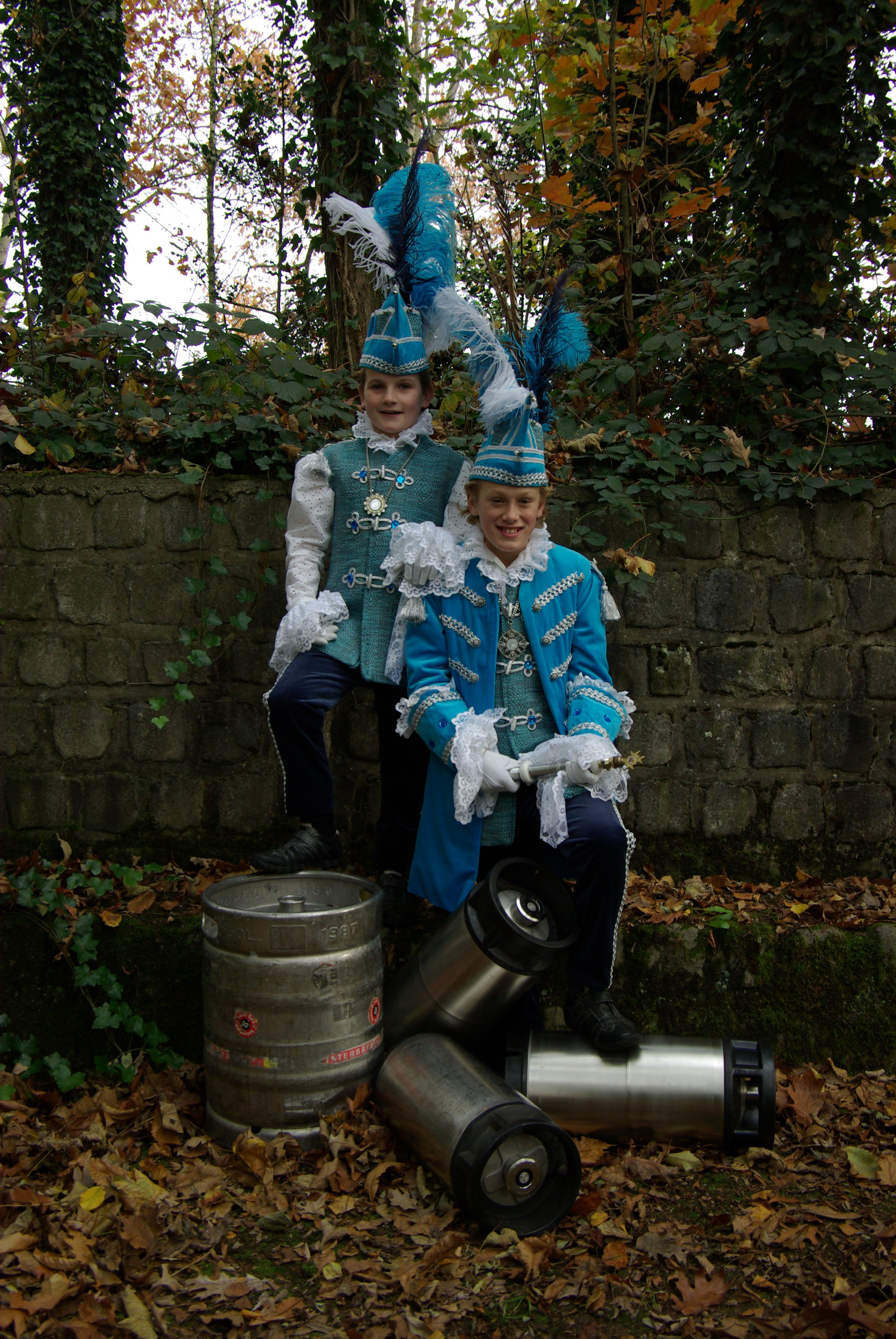
Youth prince Stan and adjutant of "Keiengat" (Waalre), 2006

=== Eleven ===
The number eleven plays an undeniably important role in the carnaval. The opinions on this subject are very divergent, so much so that one explanation often has nothing to do even with the other. On the other hand, the number eleven is not only central to the carnaval, but it has built up a kind of mystical and magical value through the ages.

==== 11 November ====
11 November, the 11th of the 11th, is an important date. 11 November is exactly 40 days before 21 December, the shortest day. This happens to be the feast day of sint Maarten (st. Martin's day). This day is celebrated in some parts of Groningen, North Holland and the southern part of Limburg and to a lesser extent in South Holland and Zeeland. This feast is the beginning of the dark period before Christmas and the long days of winter.

For centuries, 11 November was the day that the year's work was deemed to be done. The barns were filled for the winter, the selected livestock would have been slaughtered and very importantly: the lease, property taxes, interests, and tithe were to be paid. These often weighed very heavily on the population. A year of scraping, frugality and putting every penny aside, would end after the payment on 11 November.

In both the Rhenish and the Burgundian carnaval 11-11 plays an important role. At 11–11 on 11.11 a.m. is the first of court meetings by the Council of Eleven held in preparation for the upcoming carnaval. During this meeting will also the new Prince be announced. In Brabant at the same meeting the new carnaval mottos are disclosed by the prince. Also it is the start of the building of the carnaval floats for the coming parade.

==== Origin theories ====
===== Association with fools and imperfection =====
Eleven is original the "fools number" in Germanic culture. In German it is called a Schnapszahl and associated with alcohol consumption and used in numerology. In the Dutch language it is associated with idiocy (Dutch: gekkengetal). It is an imperfect number since it is one number less than the base number twelve in the duodecimal numeral system and one number more than the base number ten in the decimal numeral system. Also it is a prime number.

===== Association with elves =====
The number eleven in Dutch and German is translated as Elf. The word originates from the Proto-Germanic: ainalibi, which is a combination of the words aina (one) and libi (left "over ten") or ain (one) + leikw (leave, remain). Other derivatives are elleovene from Old English endleofan, from Proto-Germanic *ainlif- (Saxon: elleban, Old Frisian: andlova, Dutch: elf, Old High German: einlif, German: elf, Old Norse: ellifu, Gothic: ainlif).

There is suggested that the word "elf" became associated with the words Elf, Elves, Elven or Alven. Early elves, whose description depends almost entirely on Norse mythology texts, were a race of beings with magical skills, ambivalent towards humans and capable of either helping or hindering them. But Christianized societies were viewing elves in increasingly sinister light. In Anglo-Saxon England as early as the 10th century, Old English medical books attest to elves afflicting humans and livestock by "elf-shot". The German elf or alp was seen as an addler of people in medical books, but already in the High Middle Ages there were prayers warding against it as the agent causing nightmares, and eventually for the alp its identity as nightmare spirit became predominant.

The ritual re-enactment of the Wild Hunt was a cultural phenomenon among many Gallic and Germanic peoples. At the head of this army, would have been Erlenköning Hellequin.

===== Adolf of Cleve =====
Although there is certain historical data on ancient meaning of the number 11, there may also be a younger explanation. It is known that the oldest Geckengesellschaft (jester group) was founded by count Adolf of Cleve in 1381 and took place on 12 November. Everything indicates that the foundation celebration of the 11th apparently got out of control, so the signing took place one day too late. The seal of the count takes the 11th place in the row of 35 stamps. The motto of this noble jester society was EyLustigh Fröhlich (Merry Cheerful).

=== Carnaval Cabaret ===
Cabaret in dialect is held in both variants of carnaval. In North Brabant the person doing the cabaret is called a tonpraoter (barrel speaker) or in the Western part of North Brabant a sauwelaar, and is actually in or on a barrel. In Limburg they are named buuttereedner or buutteredner and in Zeeland they are called an ouwoer. They all perform a cabaret speech in dialect, during which many current issues and events of the past year are reviewed. Often there are local situations and celebrities from the local and regional politics who will be mocked, ridiculed and insulted. The tonpraoter or buuttereedner is a successor of the medieval jester.

Open stages are held in the weeks before the carnaval where people from the community, mostly amateurs, can participate in carnaval related acts like music, farces, dance acts and cabaret. Such a bonte avond is free to visit for the public. One special revue (called pronkzitting) is an organized event at or before the carnaval with singing and dancing, but focuses mainly on humorous contributions by a variety of local tonpraoters / buuttereedners. During the "pronkzitting" there are also performances of carnaval orchestras and majorettes. The prince and youth prince and their councils of eleven will attend. Unlike at other carnaval events, at the pronkzitting the usual dress code for the public is evening dress.

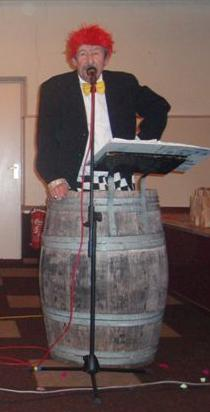
Brabantian Tonpraoter

==== Origin of the Carnaval Cabaret ====
It may be assumed that the emergence of the figure of the jester is coinciding with the development of the medieval civilization. Since the very beginning of his occurrence, the fool has been the personification of folly for centuries, as the jester was the one who tipped reality. In other words, the jesters mirrored or exaggerated the everyday reality, and is way-ward or taboo-breaking. They spoke truths that others were only secretly thinking. Actual fools often lacks the ability to behave according to the norms, while conscious jesters exaggerated to serve as a mirror to their public. The image of the jester is mainly shaped by its heyday. This ran from the Middle Ages to the late seventeenth century. The default image is that of the jester with fool's cap with bells, cheerful colors and oversized shoes, and marotte. In reality, some wore a jester costume, but other wore deliberately shabby clothes and some wore noble robes. Nowadays we imagine the jester often with a small deformed appearance, but this was not always the case.

There were basically two kinds of jesters. The ones with physical and especially mental disabilities (the fools) who could be mocked by their employers and the real jesters who were hired or recruited to mock others and entertain. If there were setbacks, they were the ones whom one could blame or who could take the heat, or the ones people could laugh about and determine that things could be worse. The jesters were intelligent artists, well-spoken and theatrical witty. They were aware of their duties and took a position between the ruler and the people. They could tell the king or ruler what no one else dared. A role that the contemporary tonpraoters and buuttereedners continue in a modern way.

=== Council of Eleven, Prince and Adjutant ===
A familiar phenomenon during the carnaval is the presence of the prince and his entourage which is a parody on the normal authorities. The prince rules the city during the days of carnaval and symbolizes this way the power that is held by the common people. The format of this custom varies by region, the prince and his jester (generally called adjutant) however, are almost universally within the carnaval traditions. The prince is traditionally a male and can be the same person for years, but often a different person is elected every year. Depending on the towns tradition, the prince is chosen by the association or by all the people of the town, in which case a campaign is often held. The prince is called Prins (Prince) or sometimes Vorst (Fürst). The female Prins / Vorst, which is called Prinses (Princess) or Vorstin (Fürstin) begins to occur more frequently the last decade. Each year the (usual all male) Council of Eleven of every carnaval association proclaims a prince, and one (adjutant) or more aides. Most associations also have an all-gender youth council of eleven which chooses a youth prince and youth aides. The council of eleven does not necessarily hold eleven members, often there are more than eleven, sometimes less. The adjutant of the prince (on occasion called jester) is part of the Council of Eleven and is the main aid of the prince and second in command.

==== Origin of the Council of Eleven ====
The actual origin of the name "Council of Eleven" is traced back to the Duchy of Brabant in the fifteenth century. The Netherlands and Belgium in the Middle Ages consisted of a number of duchies, counties, heerlijkheden, etc. One of those duchies was the Duchy of Brabant, which was the heart and most important region of the Low Countries until late in the 15th century and included the current province of North Brabant (Netherlands) and the provinces of Antwerp and Flemish Brabant (Belgium). When the Duke of Brabant Anthony of Burgundy in 1415 was killed in the battle of Anzicourt, the delegates of the seven ancient cities of Brabant and the four largest abbeys of Brabant organized a meeting to discuss the succession of the Duke. The Duchess-Widow was not eligible for the succession, because of her rights to Luxembourg. However, they had two sons, the oldest named Jan, was only eleven years. On 4 November, the states decided to recognize him as Duke of Brabant, and that the day-to-day government should be looked after by the "Council of Eleven" (consisting of the seven cities of Brabant and the four abbeys). The appointment of the board members of the "Council of Eleven" is very likely to have occurred in the following week, on or around 11 November.

==== Plumes ====
It is traditional that the prince, and his council of eleven wears a fore-and-aft bicorne with (pheasant) tail feathers, in particular in those places that are influenced by the Rhenish Carnaval. Carnaval is however by definition controlled by unwritten laws. Hence the use of this tradition varies from place to place. However generally speaking the prince wears "three" feathers on his bicorne. The former princes, adjutant and the carnaval association president wear two feathers, while the actual members of the Council of Eleven wear one feather on their bicorne. The plumes are worn on the left side of the bicorne.

=== Peasant wedding ===
Not everywhere in Limburg and Brabant is a boerenbruiloft (peasant's wedding) part of the carnaval. Especially in the northern and central part of Limburg and eastern part of North Brabant is the boerenbruiloft very often held during the carnaval and is an important part of the carnaval culture. Each carnaval association has its own tradition concerning choosing the spouse for a wedding. When it's a small association often the bride and groom are chosen by the council of eleven or by the couple that was married the year before. In Venlo it is not the carnaval association that chooses the participants of the peasant wedding, but an outsider group. This may be a company, a family, a football club, or as in 2013 a delegation of the hospital in Venlo. In that case, the board has determined who would become bride and groom.

It is not necessary that the newlyweds are a couple in real life. It is also not necessary that the bride and groom are single. Both the bride and groom, however, should be in love during the carnaval and they need to transfer their love to all the people who celebrate their wedding along with them. The highlight of the festival of the peasant wedding is the wedding and feast of the onecht (not-marriage) of the bride and groom. There are many aspects that can be found in a real-life marriage. First the engagement will be announced just as if it would be an officially marriage. And both the families should learn to know each other very well in organizing the party and the ceremony, like a normal wedding. The two families prepare a piece of entertainment for the wedding. And just like a real wedding, a reception and a feast is organized where guests are asked to wear appropriate clothing. The bride and groom will often dress in wedding clothing from before 1940. The bride for example will often wear a poffer, which is a traditional Brabantian headdress.

==== Origin of the peasant wedding ====
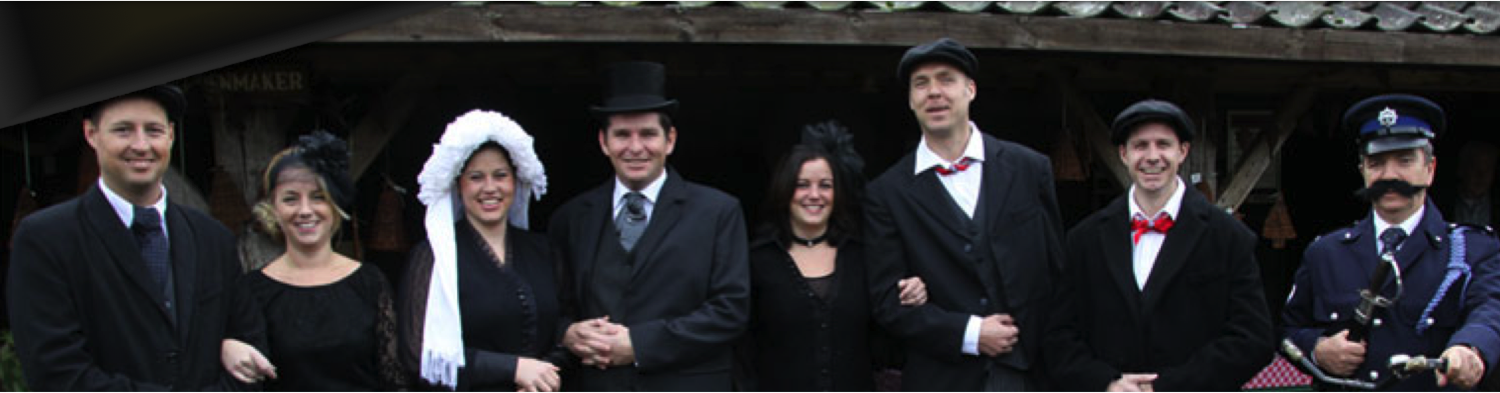
Peasant wedding or Boerenbruiloft during the Dutch carnaval, the bride is wearing a traditional white headdress named a poffer.

The first mention of a "boerenbruiloft" (peasant wedding) was in 1582, when the Saxon elector August in Dresden wedded a peasant and his wife during a large ritual ceremony d'n onech (the not-marriage). It was not a real wedding and the to-be spouse were also not real peasants, but rather the nobility. The real peasants were given the role of noblemen. It was a reversal ritual, in which the roles were deliberately reversed. This role reversal was intended to avoid the attraction of the eye of the Christian god. Within the noble circles it was believed that it was the eye of the god which at the beginning of the spring focused on them because of their failure in the past year. They thought they could escape this danger by dressing during this wedding celebrations and to behave as peasants, and thus appear to be the people at the bottom of the social ladder. They believed the consequence was that the peasants dressed as nobleman would be harmed by their god instead of the nobles themselves.

=== Music ===
==== Carnaval songs ====
Carnaval songs are a relatively recent phenomenon after World War II. Intentionally amateurish marching bands (Zaate Hermeniekes or Drunken Marching Bands) traditionally perform this kind of music on the streets, mainly in Limburg. In North Brabant the music is played mainly indoors in pubs and feast halls, which is also done in Limburg. Carnaval music is often a song written especially for the occasion and is easy to dance to. It is an expression of one's own culture, one's own lifestyle. The contents of a carnavalsschlager are often melancholy and even chauvinistic. For example, it may be an expression of pride in one's own village, town or region, local patriotism and praise of one's own place, and therefore in one's own local dialect. But it can also be a resistance to loss of identity and alienation, to changes affecting the individuality or local society and against the absorption in the broader culture. Therefore, it often happens that the village name or the name of the prince of the group, appear in the text of a carnaval song. The carnaval music is used during the carnaval to ridicule the normal culture, therefore the creating and playing of carnaval music is a very seasonal happening.

Carnaval music is usual composed in 6/8 bar or 3/4 bar. Local carnaval clubs usually try to address current issues in local dialect in a carnaval song. Carnaval songs are a form of opportunity compositions. A good carnaval song has several recognizable ingredients:

- An easy, catchy "popular" melody
- Usually the song is deliberately sung out of tune
- A rhythm with 'leaping' character: long-short is often continuously rotated and triplets are common
- Many accents in music and many question-answer elements
- The harmony contains many thirds and sixths
- The text is easy to remember (thus it can be remembered when drunk), and often humorous in nature to make a point
- The text is many times sexual, vulgar, mocking and offensive in nature or totally non-sense
- The form usually consists of several verses that alternate
- Choruses with an accessible, inviting and compelling rhythm: there should be danced on

==== Dancing ====
Hossen (jumping together in a group) is a way of dancing during the carnaval which is mainly found in Brabant, also the polonaise is done during the carnaval. In the southernmost part of the Netherlands in Limburg, there are three ways of carnaval dancing: sjoenkele (slowly moving back and forth, left to right, etc. while sitting or standing with ones arms on the shoulders of the person beside him or with the arms hooked together at 3/4 tact), pogo-ing (jumping up and down by oneself) and the polonaise. In southern Limburg the polonaise is called the reijaloet. The polonaise is usually done spontaneous and for short moment of times, but can be done by dozens of people together. Also during the parade and official gatherings there are usual dance shows performed by the majorettes called dansmarietjes or dansmariekes in Dutch.

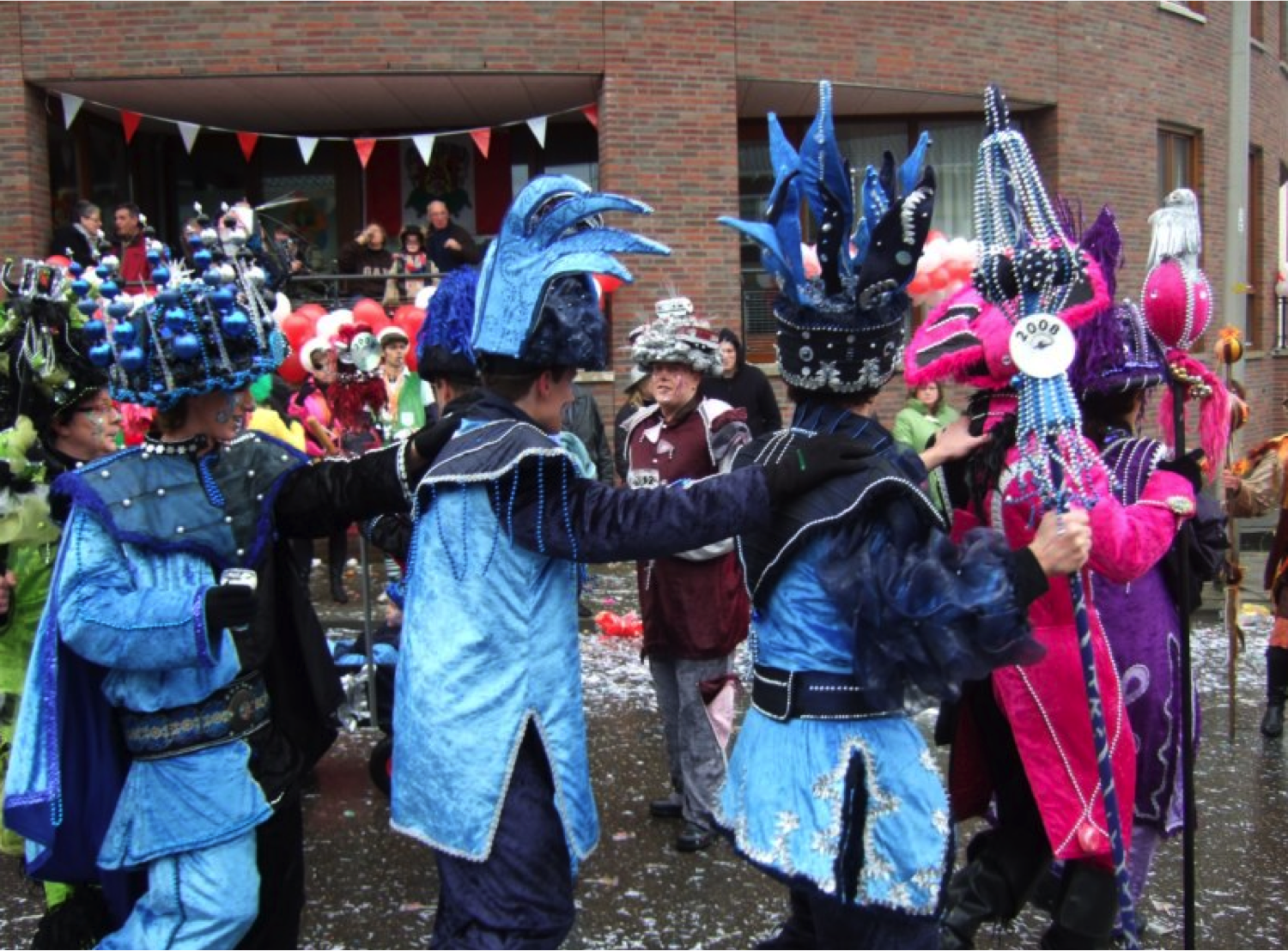
Polonaise in Kerkrade, Netherlands, Carnaval 2012

==== Dweilorkesten and Kapellen ====
During carnaval brass bands, called (joeks)kapelle or "zaate herremeniekes" (Limburg) and dweilorkesten (ambling orchestra. The word dweilen generally means "to mop" in Dutch, but in this context it means "to amble", and indicates the partygoers ambling from bar to bar) commonly provide during the feast for the music in the pubs / feasting halls and during the parades (in North Brabant). In Limburg, the orchestras are more limited to playing outside. In Limburg's capital, Maastricht, Tuesday during daytime most pubs do not play music through their speaker to give room for these bands, which naturally attracts many bands from the region and across the Dutch borders This immediately shows a big difference between the two variants: Burgundian carnaval is mainly celebrated indoors, Rhenish carnaval is mostly celebrated outdoors. Many pubs in Maastricht take their facade away during carnaval to open up to the feast on the streets. This kind of orchestra can also be seen during national sports events in the Netherlands like speed skating.

==== Examples of Dutch Carnaval Music ====
- "Carnaval in Mestreech" by Math Niël (1946)
- "Twië bein (ofwaal de veuroetgank)" (Two legs [i.e. Advancement]) by Frans Boermans and Thuur Luxembourg (1961)
- "Het Land van Maas en Waal" (The land of Meuse and Waal) by Boudewijn de Groot (1967)
- "Drinke totteme zinke" (Drink 'till we sink) by Thijs van der Molen (1969)
- "Den Uyl is in den olie" (Den Uyl is drunk / Den Uyl is into oil) by Vader Abraham & Boer Koekoek (1974)
- "Malle Babbe" (Crazy Babbe) by Rob de Nijs (1975)
- "Als het gras twee kontjes hoog is" (When the grass stands two buttocks tall) by Hydra (1976)
- "Unne spijker in munne kop" (A nail in my head) by De Stipkes (1976)
- "Limburgs klaaglied" (Limburgish lament) by Martine Bijl (1977)
- "Het leven is goed in het Brabantse land" (Life is good in the land of Brabant) by Oh Sixteen Oh Seven (1979)
- "Brabantse nachten zijn lang" (Brabantic nights are long) by Arie Ribbens (1980)
- "Er staat een paard in de gang" (There is a horse in the hallway) by André van Duin (1981)
- "Mama, woar is mien pils" (Mother, where is my beer) by Normaal (1982)
- " 's Nachts na tweeën" (At night after two) by De Havenzangers (1983)
- "Het feest kan beginnen!" (The party can get started) by De Deurzakkers (1986)
- "Bestel mar" (Just order (some beer)) by Rowwen Hèze (1987)
- "Niks stront niks" (Nothing shit nothing) by Rowwen Hèze (1988)
- "Rosamunde" by Rowwen Hèze (1992)
- " 't Dondert en 't bliksemt" (There's thunder and there's lightning) by Guus Meeuwis (1998)
- "Lauwe pis" (Lukewarm piss) by Theo Maassen (2007)
- "Zachte G, Harde L" (Soft G, Hard L / "Soft G, Hard Dick") by Jos van Oss (2010)
- "In 't land van de Maasvallei" (In the land of the Meuse valley) by W-Dreej (2012)
- "De Gròzzie van Mèn Buurvrouw" (My Neighbor's Garage) by Ferry van de Zaande & Veul Gère (2014)
- "Links Rechts" (Left Right) by Snollebollekes (2015)
- "Wittewattetis Gewittetnie" (Do you know what it is? You never know) by Vader Abraham (2016)
- "Pilsies voor de vat" (beers to grab from the tray) by Buren van de Brandweer (2017)
- "Jacqueline, waar is de Vaseline" (Jacqueline, where's the Vaseline?) by 'Mosterd na de Maaltijd' (2018)
- "Terug Over De Maas" by De Kapotte Kachels
- "Brabant Mijn Land" (Brabant is My Country) by Gullie (2019)
- "Doorgoan" (Keep Going) by Various Artist (2021)

=== Greeting and toast ===
The traditional Rhenish carnaval greeting and exclamation is Alaaf. It is an, on the Lower Rhine area, common jubilant outcry and calling to a toast, but only during the actually Carnaval festivities. It is not used on other days of the year. The word is introduced through Maastricht (although it is not customary to use it there anymore) from the Cologne word alaaf (at least 18th century, but probably older) and ended up in Limburg and hence the rest of the Southern Netherlands. The Cologne word probably goes back to a dialect form of German all-ab, meaning Everything out of the way, with extension of the second A. When just used as a greeting, the word is often accompanied by a reversed salute. The German Rhineland used to be occupied by the Prussians at the time, which had strong militaristic customs. In this region an alternate salute was devised as a protest parody: not with the right hand against the right temple as usual, but with the top of the right hand to the left temple.

=== Local rituals ===
In addition to national and provincial variations, there also is a diversity in carnaval rituals between the various cities or towns. In the many yearbooks of local carnaval groups are the local rituals described.

For example: In Den Bosch and some other near municipalities a large doll named Farmer Knillis symbolizes the peasant farmer. Dressed in an early 20th century farmers outfit and several meters tall, he stands prominently on his pedestal at the Market. On Carnaval Sunday he is revealed in the early afternoon by the Prince in the presence of sometimes thousands of carnaval celebrators. Carnaval ends on Tuesday midnight with the symbolic burial (or burning, depending on the town's tradition) of Farmer Knillis by the Prince and his Adjutant. Knillis has grown into a tradition in several towns and is in Den Bosch revealed since 1922 on Carnaval Sunday. Each leap year, Knillis is accompanied by his wife Hendrien. Until 1853 Knillis would be burned at the end of the Carnaval in Den Bosch, but the tradition was then outlawed until it revived in the early 20th century. Since then Knillis is buried instead of burned in Den Bosch. This tradition is not known however in the majority of Carnaval celebrating towns in North Brabant.

In Helmond a variation of this tradition can be found: a man-sized boulder representing Carnaval, which is buried on the forecourt, is dug up every year on Carnaval Saturday. The boulder stays above ground for four days as a symbol of the Carnaval. At the very end of the Carnaval it is buried again until the following year, while the bystanders mourn for it by loud wailing and weeping.

In Twente children dress up and go door by door making noise by rattling a stick in a jar and singing special songs to get candy, quite like children on IJsselmonde on New Year's Eve before the 1950s and nowadays in North Holland during St. Martin's Day. This is called: foekepotten. This however is not common anymore in the rest of the Netherlands. The custom of Foekepotten is already seen on a painting by Pieter Bruegel, called The Fight Between Carnival and Lent from 1559 (the man with the stick in the jar beneath the figure on the barrel).

== Rhenish Carnaval ==
The Rhenish variant, which is celebrated in the province of Limburg and has an overlap in the eastern part of North Brabant, is based on the carnaval celebrations in cities in the western German state of North Rhine - Westphalia. Especially Cologne, which in turn was based mostly on the carnival of Venice, has had a major impact on the nature of this carnaval. By the end of the 19th century, the carnaval in the Rhineland was used as an opportunity to protest against the imperialist (and protestant) Prussia which annexed the area at the time. Many of the current militaristic traditions can be traced back to this protest feast.

=== Oude Wijven / Auw Wiever ===
In the week before carnaval (usual Thursday) there are, so-called Oude Wijven or Limburgish: Auw Wiever (old women) days and Oudewijvenbals (old women balls). During Ouwe Wijve or Auw Wiever the pubs and streets are crowded by costumed women, usually dressed as old women. Men who dare to go out on the streets and in the pubs are at risk to be humiliated, be hit on the buttock and chased away. Also in some towns it is tradition that the women are allowed to kiss every man they like to during Ouw Wijve. The established tradition on this day is to also cut away the ties, belts and the shoelaces which the men wear when they get caught showing themselves. This tradition is especially widespread in the south of Limburg. It is believed to be a postwar invention from Rhineland, where women wanted to emphasize the independence they gained to men who had returned from the front after the years of war.

The tradition may have an older background though. The position of men compared to women in society has often been a matter of debate. In Cologne is since 1824 the so-called Weiberfastnacht known. On the Thursday before carnaval, women are wearing men's clothes, reversing the roles and thus literally "being the man". In the Dutch border village Groenstraat a precursor to the Auwwieverbal (Old women ball) or Auw Wieverdaag (old women day) was known already in the early 19th century. The people at that time earned a living by breeding goats and selling woman's hair. The Thursday before carnaval the men would sell the hair to their French buyers. After the sale, as the man had plenty of money, they would go visit the pubs. The women would not be at the sale because they were expected to stay at home. Out of fear that their men would squander the money raised by their hair, the women would go find their husbands to prevent them from wasting it on alcohol. The search along the pubs transformed later to the Ouwewijvenbal. The women, this time incognito, firmly asserted themselves to their husbands and other men.

Venlo has a tradition of its own, namely Truujendaag, where the women dress in late medieval clothing. This name is probably derived from the headstrong figure Gertruid Bolwater from Venlo. According to the legend during a siege of the city during the Guelders Wars in 1499 or 1511 she defeated several enemy soldiers and tore the banner from the hands of an enemy soldier.

=== Costume ===
Traditional clothing consists of elaborate costumes. Some buy a complete themed costume in a party store, others create their costumes themselves. Because the Rhenish carnaval mostly takes place outside on the streets, the costumes are also warmer and generally cover the entire body. The costumes are elaborate and consist usually out of multiple layers. Old women or witch costumes, animal costumes with horns or sometimes with antlers, face concealing masks, concealing black or red face paint and joker costumes were traditional popular, but these themes are less standard today. Ordinary jackets or clothing are never to be worn on top of the carnaval clothing, at most underneath the costume.

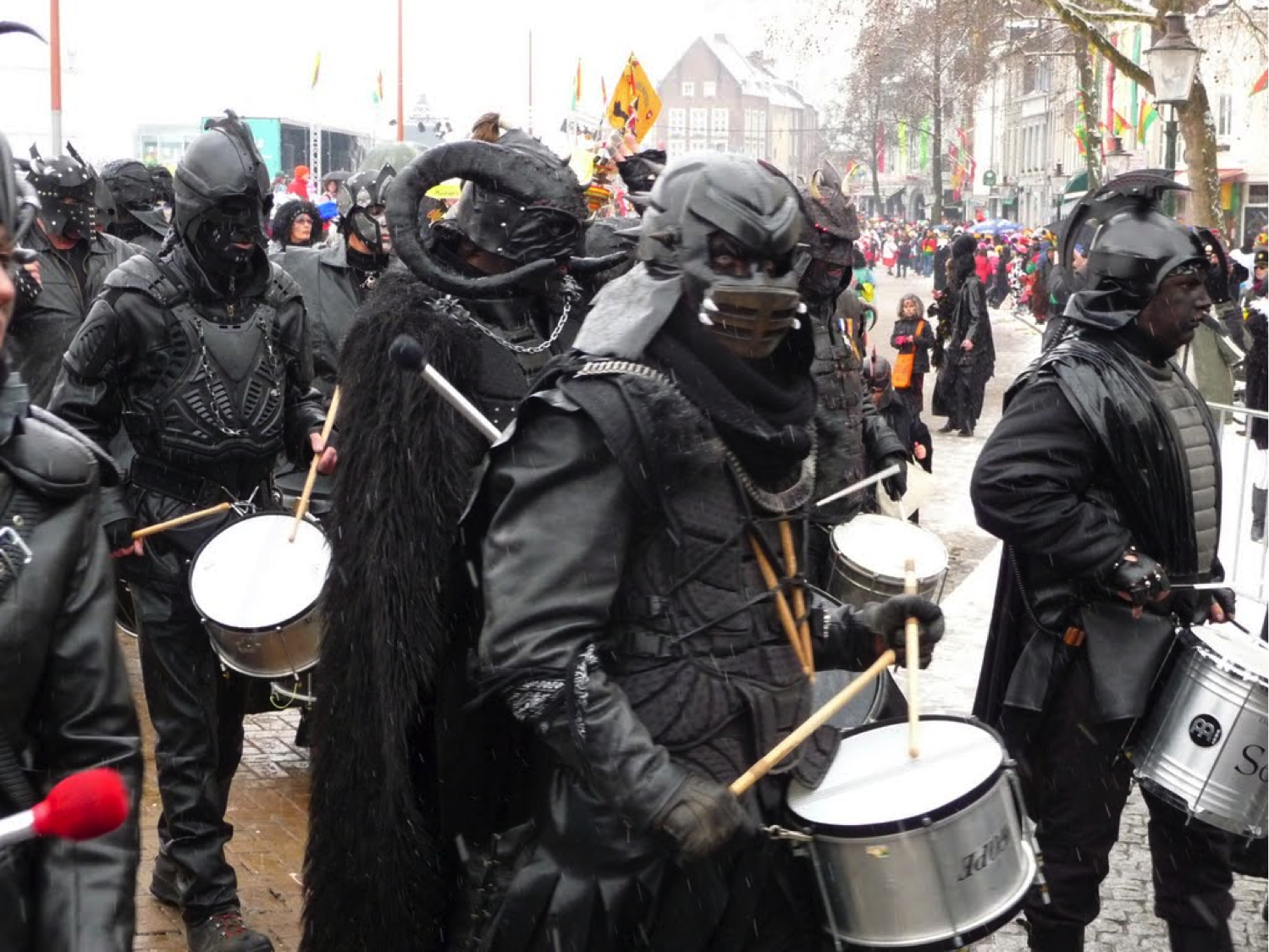
Marchingband in parade during the Dutch Carnaval 2012

=== Majorettes or Dansmarietjes ===
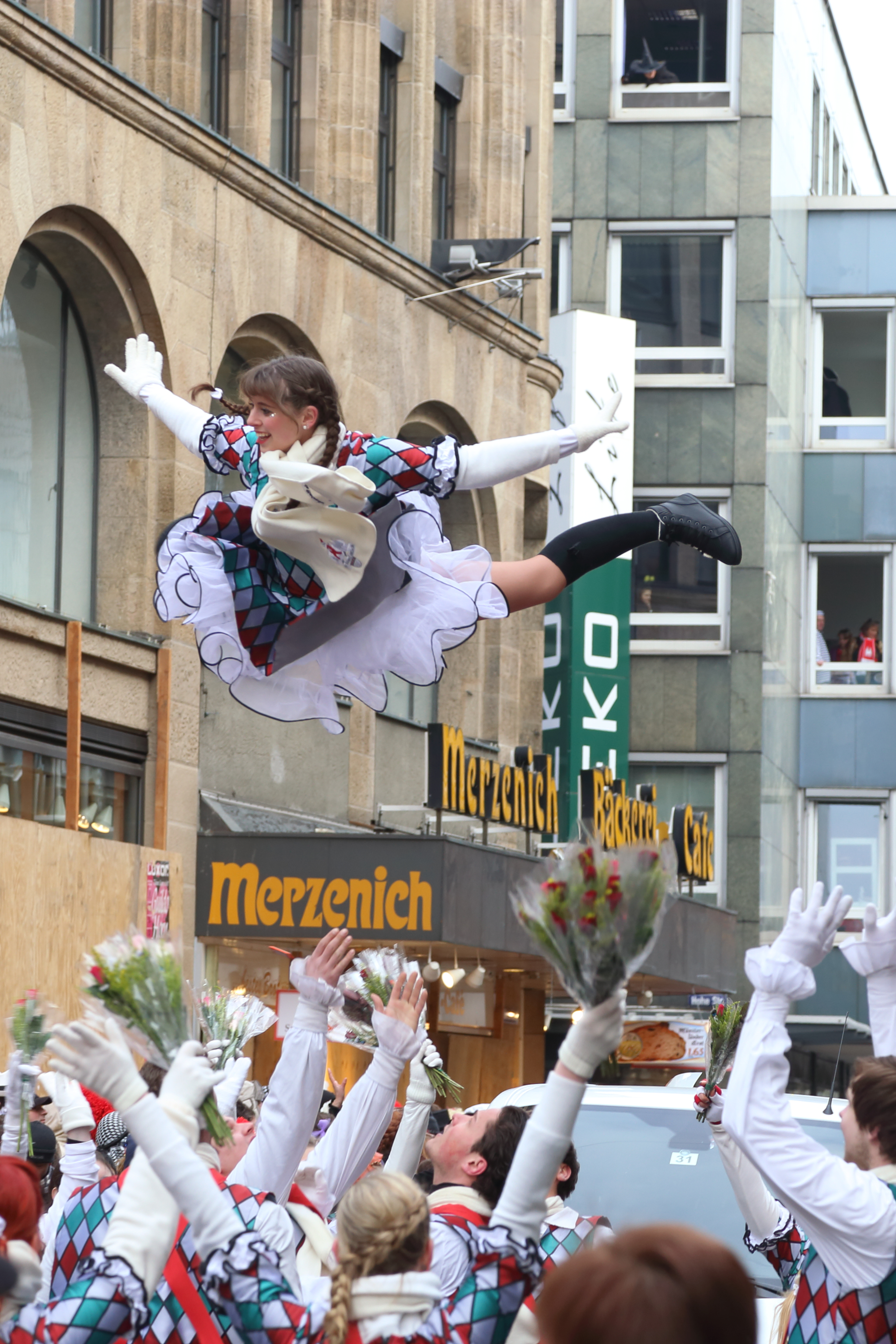
A Funkemariechen majorette is lifted at Rose Monday Parade of the Cologne Carnival in Germany

Majorettes perform a typical carnaval dance originating in the Rhineland, where the young women who perform this dance are called Tanzmariechen in German. In the Netherlands these young women or girls are called Dansmarietjes (Dance Mary's) or Dansmariekes in Dutch. They are doing choreographed dance or movement, primarily baton twirling during parades and official carnaval meetings and were introduced into the Dutch carnaval after the second world war.

During the carnival the normal form of government is parodied in the form of the Prince and his entourage taking over the town. Also the army and the defense forces were traditionally parodied as a way of protesting the Prussian occupation of the Rhenish area at the time. In Cologne, these imitations arose in particular to make Prussian militarism ridiculous, with a carnaval greeting (Alaaf), which is the normal greeting as it were reverses. And with a joke army that did just about everything, which would make a normal company look ridiculous.

The majorettes show clear origins in the camp followers in the 18th and 19th century, and have a vibrant and eventful past. Around this time Germany had a very large number of armies, and there would be young women in each regiment, who served during the day as a sellers and providers of food and drink and took on household chores like washing clothes. Thereby offered many of these women and girls themselves as prostitutes, for which they would dress themselves more sexually provocative and they would dance for the soldiers.

Around 1800 began to emerge of more regulations in the armies. Slowly these were also applied to the camp followers. Increasingly, she was a woman who was married to a corporal or soldier, and whose task it was among other things "to wash the linen," according to an old army decision. The camp follower became not a typical army prostitute anymore, but also not a proper married women. Besides caring for the soldiers, she could still continue entertaining them in various ways.

In the carnival mockery both the officers and the camp followers were depicted. The officer by portraying him as an effeminate, wig bearing, conceited fool. The camp follower as a woman who was military but provocatively costumed, but also clearly recognizable as a man: the Tanzmarie.

In the early twentieth century, the carnaval associations found further inspiration in the revue girls that performed in the theater at the time. These were scantily clad young women, accompanied by some military attributes like peak helmets and military backpacks, which showed provocative dances in small groups. The revue girl grew into a nightclub-like star. It can not be denied that the carnaval with its Tanzmariechen has popularized and even parodied the sparkling shows that could otherwise be enjoyed only in the European major cities. Young women and girls again took on the role of tanzmariechen instead of men and they performed at the parades during the post-war carnaval. A show element was added to carnaval, partly due to the rapidly evolving ballet education. Majorettes or dansmariekes began increasingly to act in groups. Some parts of the Prussian military background are sometimes still reflected today in the movements, music or clothing of the majorettes.

The somewhat slovenly camp follower who accompanied the troops, has evolved into, a still on the Prussian army-inspired, show dance group. This metamorphosis went through the intermediate of the role performed by men as Tanzmarie. Although the current majorette or dansmarietje has her roots in the carnaval scene, the associations of majorettes widely break these historical ties, and profile themselves more as a sports or dance club.

=== Colors ===
The Rhenish carnaval has three official colors which appear everywhere. These are red, yellow and green. According carnavalogist Theo Fransen from Venlo the tradition of these colors goes back several centuries, more specifically to the jester in medieval times. The jester group of Kleve (1381 – Germany) wore the colors yellow/red. The jesters preferably wore green/red in France. Even before 1450 a group of French jesters in Lyon dressed in red, yellow and green. Colours used to have much more meaning than nowadays, and were very important as a means of communication. An at that time most people could not read or write and therefore used other symbols among which were colors. The symbolism of the colors of the jester was for people in the Middle Ages immediately clear.

In present day, a jester is seen as funny and humorous. At the time of the Middle Ages this was different, since the jester in fact was the personification of devil. The symbolic value each color the jester carries should be seen in that regard.

Red is the color of Christian virtue and ardent love but also is the color of the devil, fire, death, conflict and war. The yellow color stands for cheerfulness and elation, but also envy, retardation, ignorance and insanity. Green represents new life, youthfulness, boldness, the joy of life, vibrancy, growth and prosperity, but on the other hand, also stands for inexperience and nescience.

== Burgundian Carnaval ==
The exuberant Burgundian carnaval is the variant that is traditionally seen in most places in the north, mid and west of North Brabant (including the area of Den Bosch and Oss), Gelderland (Land of Maas and Waal, Achterhoek, Arnhem, Nijmegen), parts of Utrecht and in Overijssel (Twente), Flanders and in some places in South Beveland. The eastern part of North Brabant (specifically the Peelland Kwartier and in a lesser degree the Kempenland Kwartier) shows a combination of both Burgundian and Rhenish characteristics: though the festivities take place mostly inside the pubs and halls, it shows many costume traditions and other customs from the Rhenish Carnaval, but without the Prussian militaristic influences.

=== Motto ===
Many, but not all, Burgundian carnavals towns have an official motto. This is often a famous saying in local dialect. It is proclaimed on 11 November by the new Prince.

Motto's of "Kielegat" (Breda) since 2000

- 2000 – De kop isser af.
- 2001 – Tis ene grote kerremus.
- 2002 – Dur wazzis... eel lang geleje.
- 2003 – Tis nie te filleme.
- 2004 – We gaon dum boot in.
- 2005 – Me zijn ut spoor bijster.
- 2006 – Me maoken'ut gèèf bont.
- 2007 – Ast mar erregus op lekt.
- 2008 – Ziedegij ut ok zitte.
- 2009 – T'Oren, zien en zwijgen.
- 2010 – Tis drop of dronder.
- 2011 – K'ebber un nuske vor.
- 2012 – K'ebb'ut licht gezien.
- 2013 – Meej tweej zevus kende nie blijve zitte.
- 2014 – Ut wor dweile of plakke.
- 2015 – Kekse Straole.

=== Costume ===
The typical costume of the Burgundian Carnaval has developed in the prosperous cities of the Duchy of Brabant and County of Flanders at the time of the Burgundian Netherlands. The shape of the Burgundian carnaval was originally that of a costumed eating feast during which people ridiculed each other. Because of the great poverty that prevailed in Brabant after the Golden Age until World War II, the traditional feast became characterized by (seemingly) simple costumes, of which the blue smock with red bandana of mid and especially western North Brabant is perhaps the most iconic and can still be found among the costumes today. The wearing of the smock secondarily made everyone egalitarian, since people's status cannot be determined by their clothing and thus making it possible to criticize authority regardless people's position in daily life. Traditional clothing consists of old clothing, curtains, blue smocks and bandana with all kinds of accessories. This outfit can be found especially in the western part of North Brabant, but it is becoming less common in the last decade.

Burgundian carnaval takes place mostly inside in pubs and feasting halls. Since it is warmer in there, the clothing is also less thick and consists of fewer layers. When going to the different feasting locations, many people use old coats to keep from getting cold outside.

=== Name changing ===
It is common for cities with a Burgundian carnaval tradition to change their name during carnaval (although there are some places in eastern Netherlands with the Rhenish carnaval which do this as well). This name changing tradition is especially common in the towns in and around North Brabant. The tradition to change the city names originates in North Brabant and is seldom seen in Limburg. In Limburg some towns do change their name during carnaval into a dialect version.

During the three days of the carnaval Den Bosch for example will change its name to Oeteldonk, which by popular belief says "Frog Hill". Contrary to popular belief, oetel in the name Oeteldonk is not a referral to a frog but is a facetious reference to the 's-Hertogenbosch Bishop Adrianus Godschalk (Den Dungen 1 August 1819 – 's-Hertogenbosch 2 January 1892) who came from the village of Den Dungen to become the new Bishop of Den Bosch (8 January 1878), and often fulminated against the "Pagan" Carnaval festivities. "Van den Oetelaar" was a very common surname in Den Dungen at that time. Donk is a reference to a higher dry place in the marsh. The frog is however a symbol often used during Carnaval, and it became a symbol of the Oeteldonk Marsh.

Some examples of carnaval name changes are;

- Ganzegat: Aarle-Rixtel
- Turftreiersriek: America
- De Klot: Asten
- Baek: Beek
- De Heksenketel: Beek
- Ganzendonck: Beek en Donk
- Krabbegat: Bergen op Zoom
- Klompengat: Best
- Eendengat (Indegat): Boxtel
- Kielegat: Breda
- Bokkenriek: Budel
- Oiverland: Eerde
- Lampegat: Eindhoven
- Krekkelstad Enschede
- Oggelvorsenpoel: Esch
- 't Slotgat: Empel
- Lappegat: Geldrop
- Dringersgat: Gilze
- Ballefruttersgat: Goirle
- Krullendonk: Heesch
- Snevelbokkenland: Heeswijk-Dinther
- Kraaienland: Heeze
- Keiebijtersstad / Kattegat: Helmond
- Oeteldonk: 's-Hertogenbosch
- Pezerikkengat: Hilvarenbeek
- Lappelekkursland: Hoogeloon
- Dreumelrijk / Hôrs: Horst
- Sanegat: Huijbergen
- Blaosdonk: Leende
- Ploegersland: Liempde
- Kouwvoetenland: Lierop
- Raopersgat: Lieshout
- Mestreech: Maastricht
- 't Heidurp: Mariahout
- Vlègeldarp: Montferland
- Knotsenburg: Nijmegen
- Kneutergat: Nijnsel
- Skôn Orregat: Oirschot
- Döllekesgat: Oisterwijk
- Kaaiendonk: Oosterhout
- Ossekoppenrijk: Oss
- Ostrecht: Ossendrecht
- Boemeldonck: Prinsenbeek
- Put en Buntland: Putte
- Pomperstad: Ravenstein
- 't Bremspoersengat: Riethoven
- Wringersgat: Rijen
- Tullepetaonstad: Roosendaal
- Zandhazendorp: Rosmalen
- Moesland: Schaijk
- Schorsbos: Schijndel
- Papgat: Sint-Oedenrode
- De Meerpoel: Someren
- Krutjesgat: Son en Breugel
- Plankcity: Tegelen
- Kruikestad: Tilburg
- Knoerissenrijk / Keienschijtersrijk: Uden
- 't Bokkeriek: Valkenburg
- Striepersgat: Valkenswaard
- Kuussegat: Veghel
- Rommelgat: Veldhoven
- Jocus Riék: Venlo
- Piëlhaazeriek: Venray
- Pieperland: Volkel
- Dommelbaorzedurp: Vught
- Schoenlapperslaand: Waalwijk
- Keiengat: Waalre
- Wjeeldrecht: Woensdrecht / Hoogerheide
- Zeuvebultelaand: Zevenbergen
- Reigerland: Zijtaart
- Moesland: Schaijk

=== Colors ===
The Burgundian Carnaval does not necessarily use the green, red and yellow which is used in the Rhenish Carnaval. In Den Bosch for example, the traditional carnaval colors are red, white and yellow. These colors are the combined colors of the catholic church (white and yellow), and the Brabantian flag (red and white). A flag with these colors is already seen on the painting The Fight Between Carnival and Lent by Pieter Bruegel in 1559, 's-Hertogenbosch. Tilburg uses green and orange as carnaval colors, Eindhoven has orange and sky blue and Breda uses red and orange. Nijmegen officially uses red and black. Helmond has a different color each year, but is also known for the colors black, yellow, green, white and red.

== Sources ==
- A.P. Van Gilst, Vastelavond en Carnaval. De geschiedenis van een volksfeest (Veenendaal 1974)
- Th. Fransen, Carnaval ontmaskerd? (Maasbree 1981)
- D.R. Moser, Fastnacht – Fasching – Karneval (Graz/Wenen/Keulen 1986)
- Carnaval. Themanummer van volkscultuur. Tijdschrift over tradities en tijdsverschijnselen 3,1 (1986)
- C. Wijers, Prinsen en Clowns in het Limburgse narrenrijk. Het carnaval in Simpelveld en Roermond 1945–1992 (Amsterdam 1995)
- Knipselarchief Meertens Instituut
