= I-5 Skagit River bridge collapse =

Road bridge collapse in Mount Vernon, Washington

I-5 Skagit River bridge
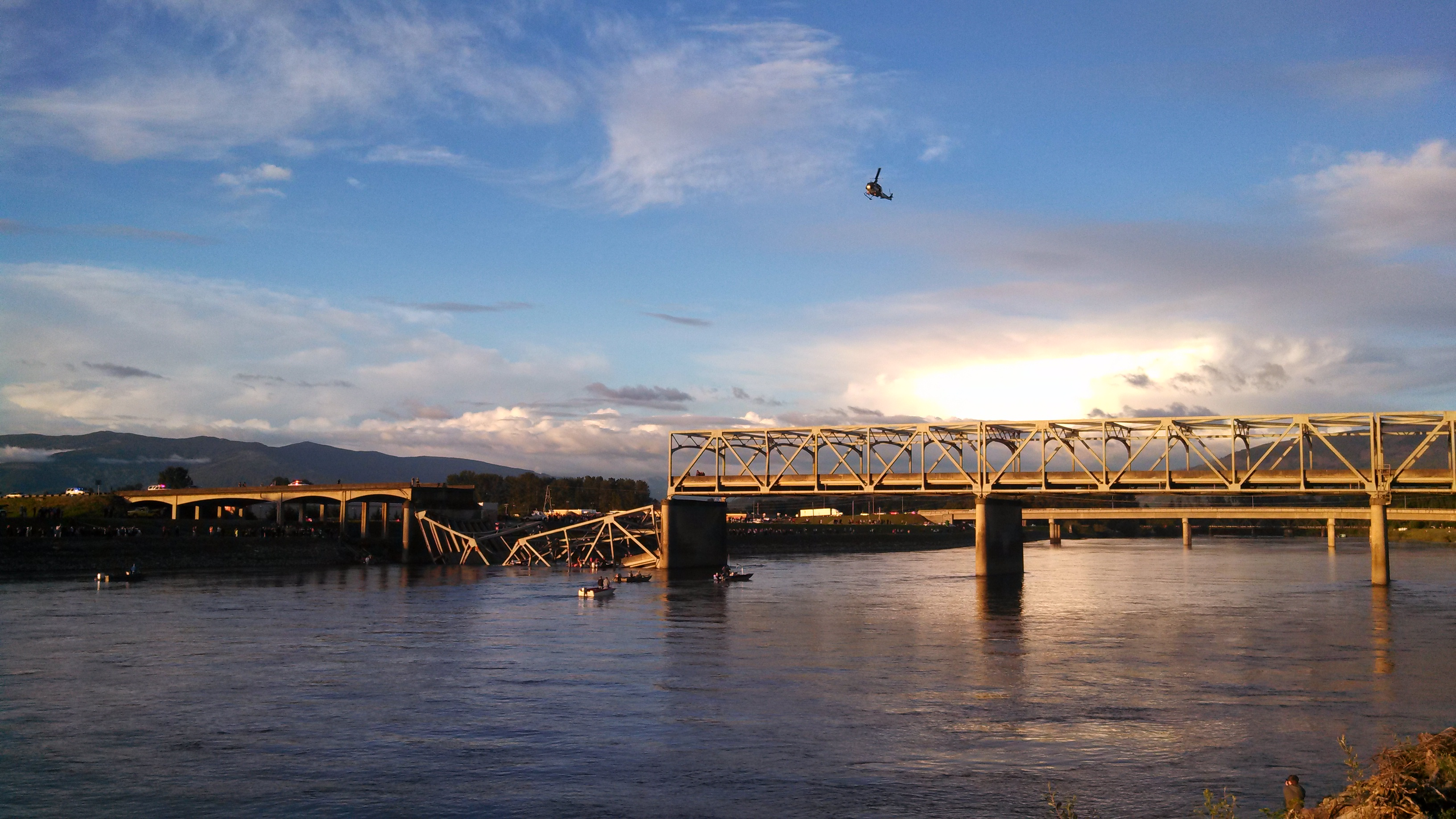
- Boats in the water and a helicopter overhead about an hour and a half after the bridge collapse
- Coordinates: 48°26′43.8″N 122°20′28.1″W
- Carried: I-5 (4 lanes)
- Crossed: Skagit River
- Locale: Mount Vernon, Washington
- Maintained by: Washington State Department of Transportation
- ID number: 0004794A0000000

Characteristics
- Design: Through-truss bridge
- Material: Steel
- Total length: 1,112 feet (339 m)
- Width: 72 feet (22 m)
- No. of spans: 4

History
- Opened: 1955
- Collapsed: May 23, 2013

Statistics
- Daily traffic: 70925

Location
- Interactive map of I-5 Skagit River bridge

On May 23, 2013, at approximately 7:00 pm PDT, a span of the bridge carrying Interstate 5 over the Skagit River in the U.S. state of Washington collapsed. Three people in two different vehicles fell into the river below and were rescued by boat, escaping serious injury. The cause of the catastrophic failure was determined to be an oversize load striking several of the bridge's overhead support beams, leading to an immediate collapse of the northernmost span.

The through-truss bridge was built in 1955 and connects the Skagit County cities of Mount Vernon and Burlington, providing a vital link between Vancouver, British Columbia and Seattle. It consists of four consecutive spans that are structurally independent. Only the northernmost span collapsed into the river; the adjacent span also sustained impact damage from the same vehicle, but not severe enough to result in a collapse. The overhead support structure was known to have been struck by a truck as recently as October 2012.

Not long before the accident, the bridge had been evaluated as safe. Although not structurally deficient, it was considered "functionally obsolete", meaning it did not meet current design standards. The bridge's design was "fracture-critical", meaning that it did not have redundant structural members to protect its structural integrity in the event of a failure of one of the bridge's support members.

Within a month of the collapse, two temporary bridges were erected and placed on the failed span's support columns while the permanent bridge was built. In September 2013, the permanent bridges were installed and work began to prevent similar failures of the remaining three spans.

== Background ==
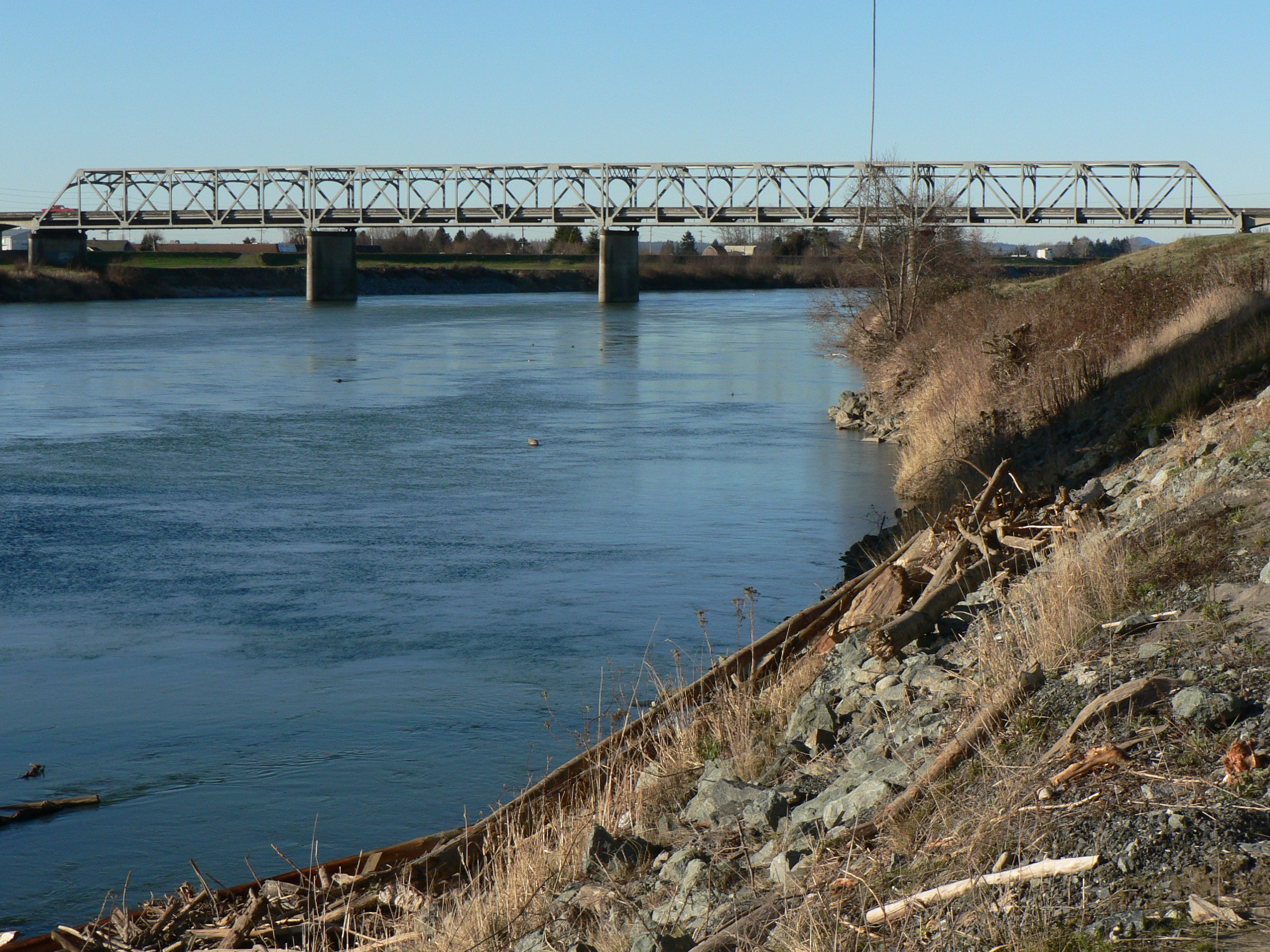
The bridge before the collapse

The bridge carries a section of Interstate 5 (I-5) over the Skagit River between Mount Vernon and Burlington, in Washington state, about 60 miles (97 km) north of Seattle. I-5 is the primary highway between the metropolitan areas of Seattle and Vancouver, British Columbia. Before the collapse, approximately 71,000 vehicles crossed the bridge every day.

The bridge was built in 1955, as part of the state government's upgrades to the U.S. Route 99 corridor and a year before the Interstate Highway System was begun. The bridge carries four lanes of traffic, two lanes in each direction separated by a median barrier. The portions over the river are four consecutive spans, each 160 feet (49 m) long. The spans are built from triangulated steel girders, using a through-truss design where the roadway passes in an open tunnel between the left and right trusses and between the lower and upper truss work. The roadway has relatively limited vertical clearance for tall vehicles due to the upper truss members. The abutted spans share pier footings and appear to be one continuous bridge, but the four spans are actually independent.

The bridge had been recently evaluated as safe and in good condition despite being 58 years old; it was not listed as structurally deficient. The bridge was classified as functionally obsolete, in this case because the bridge does not meet current design standards for lane widths and vertical clearance in new highway bridges. The bridge was not a candidate for any significant upgrades or replacement and was well-maintained.

== Through-truss design ==
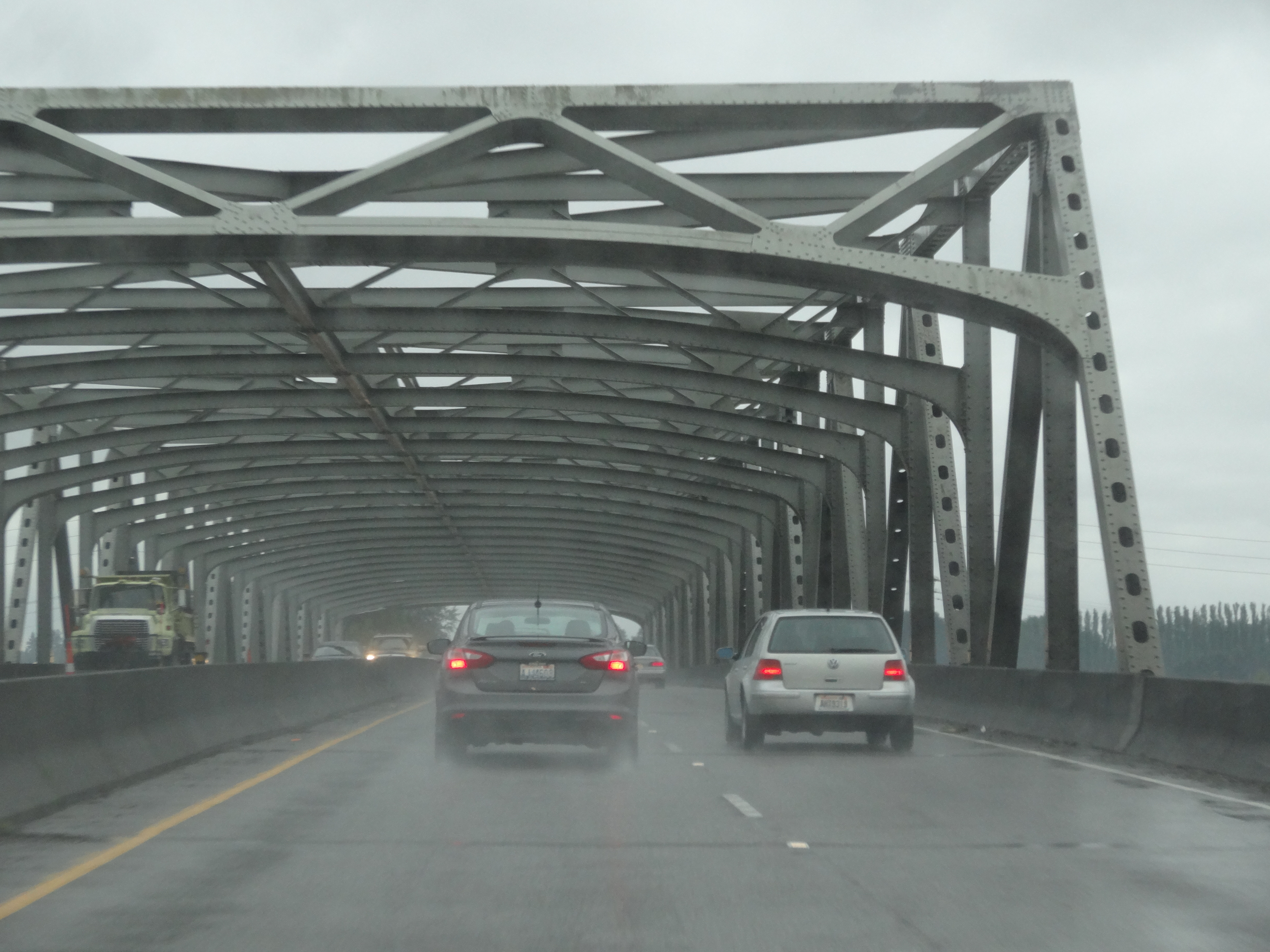
The bridge as seen while driving southbound, showing its curved trusswork. This photo was taken two weeks before the collapse.

This steel through-truss bridge had a "fracture-critical" design with non-redundant load-bearing beams and joints that were each essential to the whole structure staying intact. An initial failure (perhaps by cracking) of a single essential part can sometimes overload other parts and make them fail, which quickly triggers a chain reaction of even more failures and causes the entire bridge span to collapse. In 2007 the I-35W Mississippi River bridge in Minneapolis collapsed suddenly from slow cracking of a single undersized and over-stressed gusset plate. In steel, these initial fractures begin small and take years to grow large enough to become dangerous. Following the Minneapolis incident, such age-related disasters in fracture-critical bridges are now avoided by finding and repairing cracks in a required thorough inspection every two years. Eighteen thousand bridges in the United States are labelled fracture-critical (from their design) and require crack inspections. The Skagit River bridge had last been inspected for cracks in August and November 2012 with only minor work needed.

Besides fracturing, some bridges with critical non-redundant parts can also suddenly fail from buckling of compressive members (the opposite of cracking of tensile members). In through-truss bridges the critical compressive parts are the top-chord beams running horizontally along the top of the bridge, parallel to the roadway edges. They carry most of the weight of the bridge and traffic. The chords are normally kept aligned and held in place by vertical posts, diagonals, and sideways sway struts. Top chords will quickly fold if their joints somehow become misaligned. Buckling damage is cumulative, but mostly happens from collision damage or overstresses rather than from age and corrosion.

The vertical clearance for vehicles is limited by the portals and sideways sway struts. These are relatively low in older bridges. In Washington State bridges, the sway struts are often curved downwards at the outer ends, with less clearance above the outer lanes and outer shoulders. Tall loads then need to use the inner lanes for maximal clearance. These bridges are vulnerable to impacts by overheight vehicles, and such impacts were common. There was a known strike on this bridge that occurred on October 22, 2012, and investigators found evidence of several other impacts in years past. Bridge inspection reports dating back to 1979 frequently note damage caused by over-height vehicles, and an inspection report from late 2012 noted a three-inch gash in the steel.

According to Charles Roeder, a professor of civil engineering at the University of Washington in Seattle, through-truss bridges were a common bridge design in the 1950s (there are 10,200 through-truss bridges in the US), but "[i]f you take out some of the top framing, you set that bridge up for a stability failure." Before computers, bridge engineers analyzed truss forces by slide rule, with each calculation being time-consuming. Although the finite element method and plastic design theory, both capable of analyzing redundant structures, had recently been formulated and had seen occasional use, they required significantly more calculation than the simple calculation methods for statically determinate structures, which precluded the use of redundant structural members. A great number of bridges were being designed at that time, and there were insufficient design engineers available to design many bridges as indeterminate structures.

Nowadays, through-truss and other fracture-critical designs are avoided in most new bridges for moderate-sized spans. Using three or more parallel main beams or trusses allows the structure to survive a single component failure.

== Incident ==
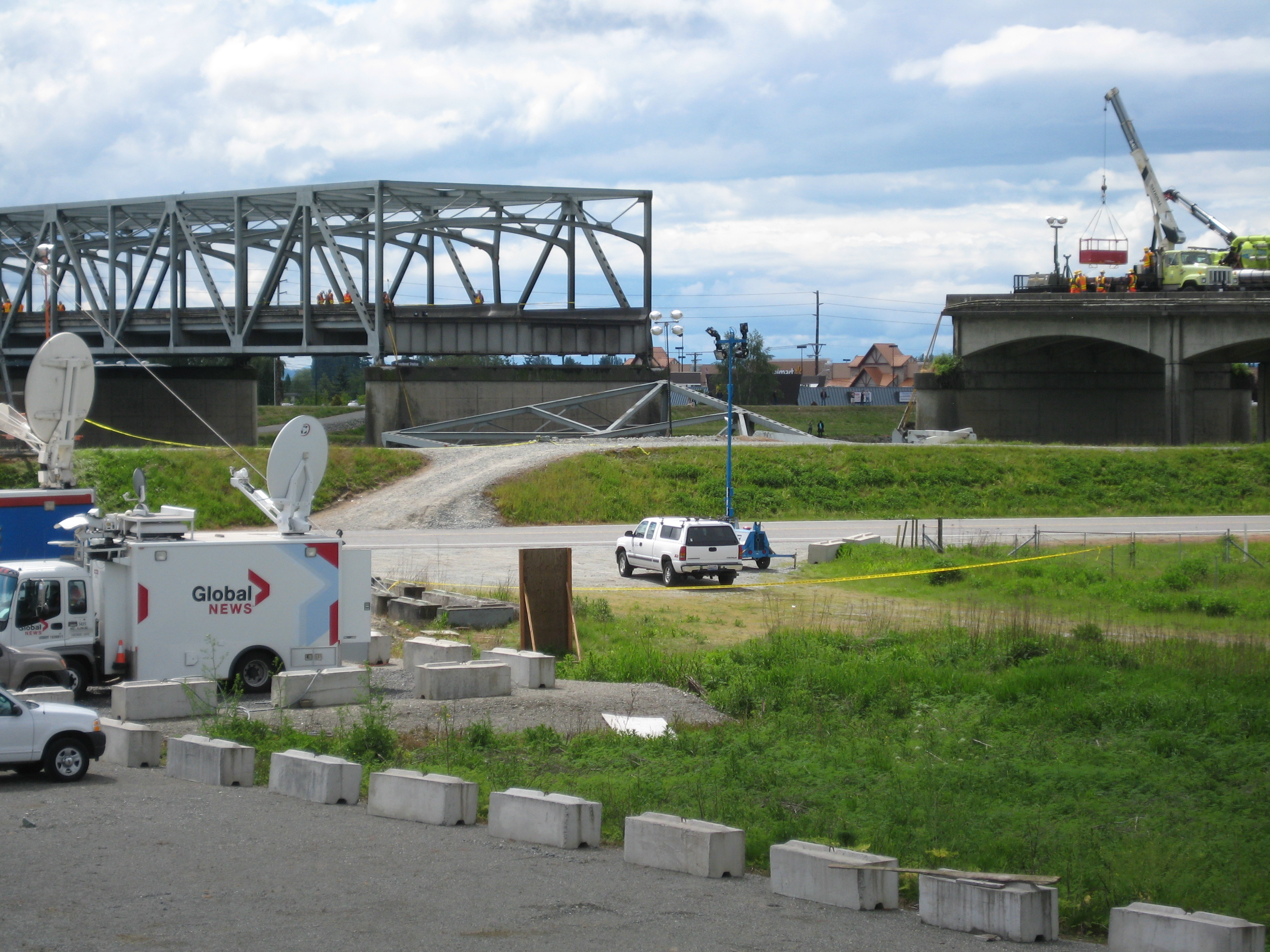
Crews at the scene of the collapse on the day following the accident

The collapse was caused by a southbound semi-trailer truck from Canada hauling an oversize load to Vancouver, Washington, directly damaging sway struts and, indirectly, the compression chords in the overhead steel frame (trusswork) on the northernmost span of the bridge. Despite a pilot car being hired to ensure the load could pass safely, the pilot driver was chatting on her cellphone and never radioed the truck driver that there would be a problem crossing the Skagit bridge, nor to warn the trucker to use the taller-clearance of the inside lane. The vertical clearance from the roadway to the upper arched beam in the outer lane was 14 feet 7 inches (4.45 m), and all trucks with oversize loads were expected to travel in the inside lane where the clearance was around 17 feet (5.2 m) (part of the "fracture-critical" design issue rectified after the incident). The oversize truck instead entered the bridge in the outer lane, while a second semi-truck and a BMW were passing it in the inner lane. The oversize truck had received a State oversize permit for a wide and tall load, for a height of 15 feet 9 inches (4.80 m), and after the collapse a "dented upper corner and a scrape along the upper side [were] visible on the 'oversize load' equipment casing being hauled on the truck." The National Transportation Safety Board (NTSB) measured the truck's height, after the crash, to be 15 feet 11 inches (4.85 m).

The oversize truck completed crossing the bridge while the first span immediately collapsed behind it. Both the driver of the oversized load and the pilot vehicle remained at the scene and cooperated with investigators.

There were no fatalities as a direct result, but three people were transported to local hospitals after being rescued from their fallen cars. The cars remained on the flooded bridge deck after it fell into the river.

The trucker, employed by Mullen Trucking, was hauling an oversize load containing a housing for drilling equipment. The company's vice-president, Ed Sherbinski, said permits had been issued from Washington State that included clearance for all bridge crossings on the route. The truck had been led over the bridge by a pilot escort vehicle. A spokesman for the Washington State Department of Transportation said there are no warning signs leading up to the bridge regarding its clearance height. In Washington, only overcrossings of less than 14 feet (4.3 m) (the normal legal height limit) are required to have advance postings of height restrictions.

The oversize truck also damaged a sway strut of the second span, but not enough to initiate a collapse. That span was subsequently repaired.

== Investigation ==
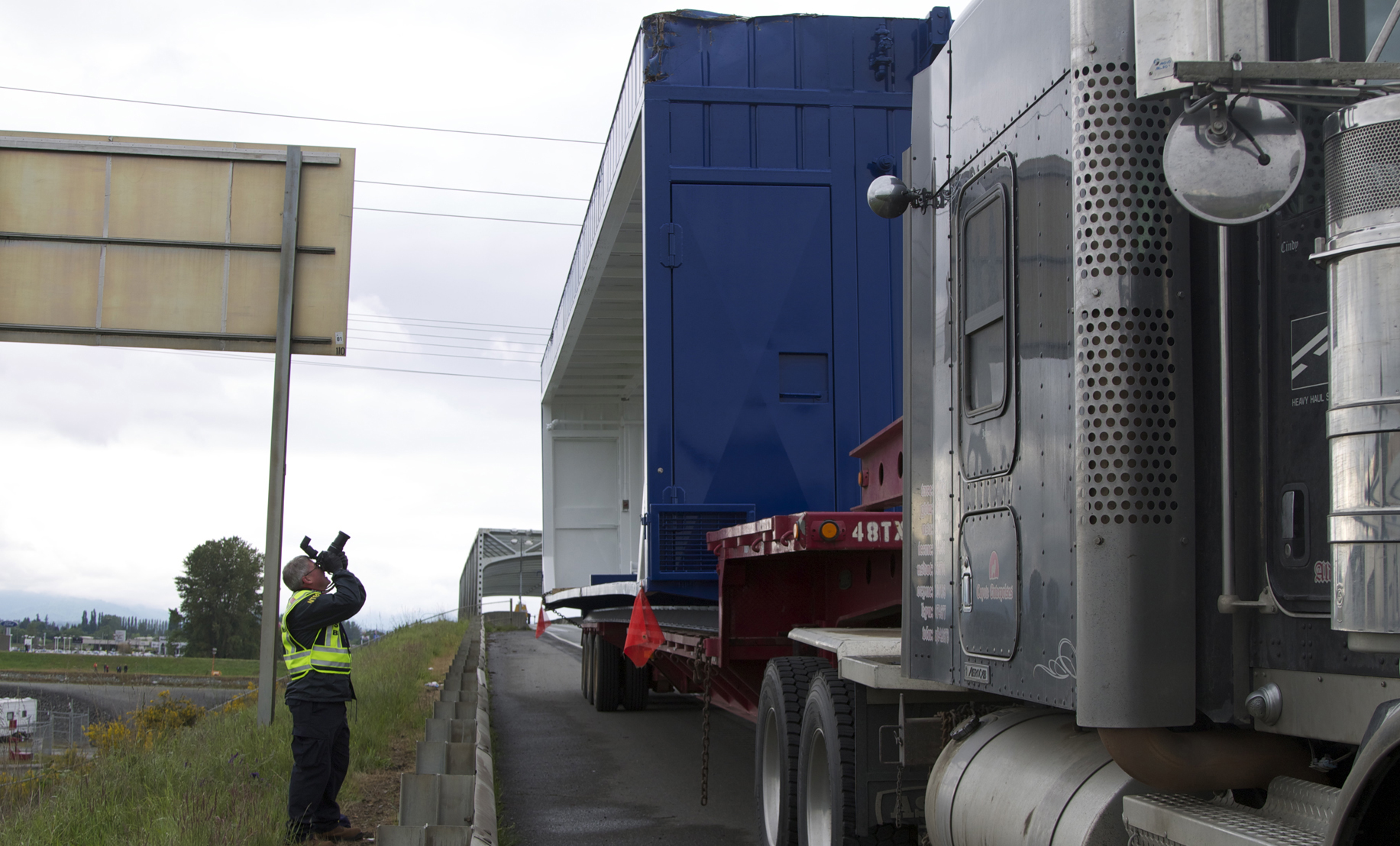
An NTSB investigator examines the truck that struck the bridge.

The Washington State Patrol and the National Transportation Safety Board investigated the accident. The NTSB's report attributes the collision to the tall-load truck being in the wrong lane (the bridge's outer lane), and to its being crowded further into the shoulder by the truck passing it. It attributes the bridge collapse to the collision taking out multiple sway braces, which destabilized the critical load-bearing (upper-chord) members.

== Lawsuits ==
Two of the three victims of the collapse filed a lawsuit against Mullen Trucking, the truck driver, the pilot car driver, and pilot car company. According to the suit, the negligence of the trucking and pilot car companies led to the collapse of the bridge. Despite issues related to the Washington State Department of Transportation (WSDOT) not flagging the Skagit River Bridge on its list of height hazards for truckers planning routes for oversized loads, WSDOT was not named in the suit as the victims and their attorney did not want to involve taxpayer money.

== Response and replacement ==
Governor Jay Inslee declared an economic "state of emergency" for three surrounding counties (Skagit County, Snohomish County, and Whatcom County) in order to cope with disruption to traffic and the local economy. Traffic on I-5 was detoured around the scene of the collapse on the adjacent Riverside Drive bridge upstream, which caused traffic congestion in the area. Other detours included State Route 536 through downtown Mount Vernon and via Fir Island.

The collapsed span was temporarily replaced by a pair of two-lane bridges manufactured by ACROW, which were rolled onto the existing bridge piers. It went into service on June 19. Inspections on the temporary span near the end of July 2013 uncovered that part of an "L" joint that holds the asphalt in place between the temporary bridge and permanent roadway had come loose. The right lane of the bridge was closed for about two hours while crews welded the joint back into place and spread new asphalt.

A $6.87 million contract was awarded to contractor Max J. Kuney Construction of Spokane to design and build a permanent replacement span. It was built alongside the temporary span without interrupting traffic, and moved into place during an overnight closure on September 14–15, 2013.

Shortly afterward, changes were made to the three remaining spans to raise the bridge's maximum allowable height, which included replacing the curved overhead sway braces with straight ones. This retrofit provides a full 18-foot (5.49 m) vertical clearance across all four traffic lanes, allowing overheight vehicles to travel in the outer lanes. The work was completed in mid-November of 2013.

The collapse raised questions about how WSDOT regulates oversize vehicles. WSDOT leaves it up to drivers to determine a safe route to their destination, unlike in many other states where routes are assigned. However, while WSDOT provides these drivers a list of hazards in the state, it did not list the Skagit River Bridge as a hazard, even though the overhead sway braces of the outer lane were a full 2 feet 5 inches (0.74 m) lower than the inner lane. State lawmakers immediately started exploring changes to the state's oversize vehicle laws.

The bridge constructed to replace the collapsed bridge has been named the Trooper Sean M. O'Connell Jr. Memorial Bridge. State trooper Sean O'Connell was killed while directing traffic through the detour after he was thrown from his motorcycle by a truck. Shortly after the accident, three state lawmakers proposed a bill that would rename the repaired bridge after him; this change was approved by the Washington State Transportation Commission.

== Washington's infrastructure ==
Prior to the bridge collapse the Seattle Section of the American Society of Civil Engineers (ASCE) issued the 2013 Report Card for the State of Washington's infrastructure. The state's bridges were given a grade of "C−" (an average score among states). There were 400 structurally deficient bridges in Washington. Thirty-six percent of all bridges are more than 50 years old. The oldest bridges were designed for an expected life of only 50 years; keeping them safe is increasingly difficult and expensive. The advocacy group Transportation for America reports that 5.1% of Washington's bridges are structurally deficient, which is the sixth best in the country.

== See also ==
- List of bridge failures
