= Oversize =

Oversize may refer to:

- Oversize permit
- Oversize cargo or Oversize load
- Oversized racket (sports equipment) as used in squash and tennis
- "Oversized", a song by Basement from Promise Everything
