= British Columbia floods =

British Columbia is the westernmost province of Canada, it has experienced many floods in its history.

== Significant flooding events ==
- 1894 Fraser River flood
- Sumas Lake floods
- 1948 Fraser River flood
- 2021 Pacific Northwest floods
- 2024 British Columbia floods
- 2025 Pacific Northwest floods
