= 2025 Pacific Northwest floods =

Natural disaster in Canada and the United States

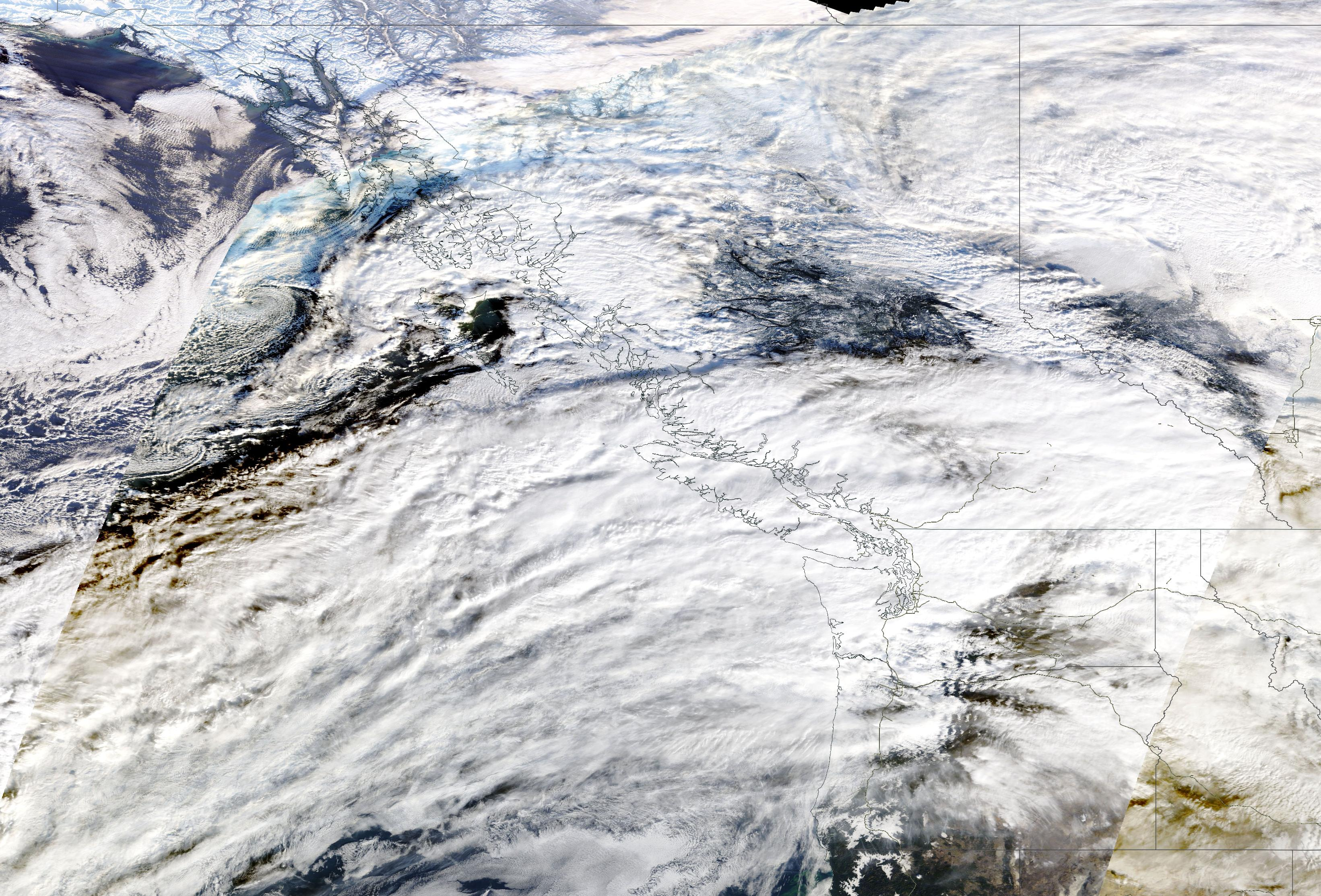
- Satellite view of the atmospheric river on December 10
- Date: 8–19 December 2025 (11 days)
- Location: Southwestern British Columbia, Canada Washington, Oregon, Montana, United States
- Cause: Atmospheric river
- Deaths: 2

Beginning on December 8, 2025, a series of severe floods impacted rivers and lowlands in the Pacific Northwest, particularly Western Washington in the United States and the Fraser Valley in British Columbia, Canada. The floods were triggered by an atmospheric river that was among the strongest and longest-lasting in the history of the Puget Sound region. Up to 10 inches (25 cm) of rain fell in the Cascade Range due to the storm system and a total of 5 trillion gallons (19 trillion litres) within a week-long period.

A state of emergency was declared by Washington governor Bob Ferguson on December 10 along with an order to deploy the Washington National Guard and the Washington State Guard to prepare for disaster response. An estimated 100,000 people in Washington are within areas with evacuation orders due to the expected impact of the floods. A local state of emergency was declared in several areas of British Columbia near the Fraser River.

== Meteorological synopsis ==
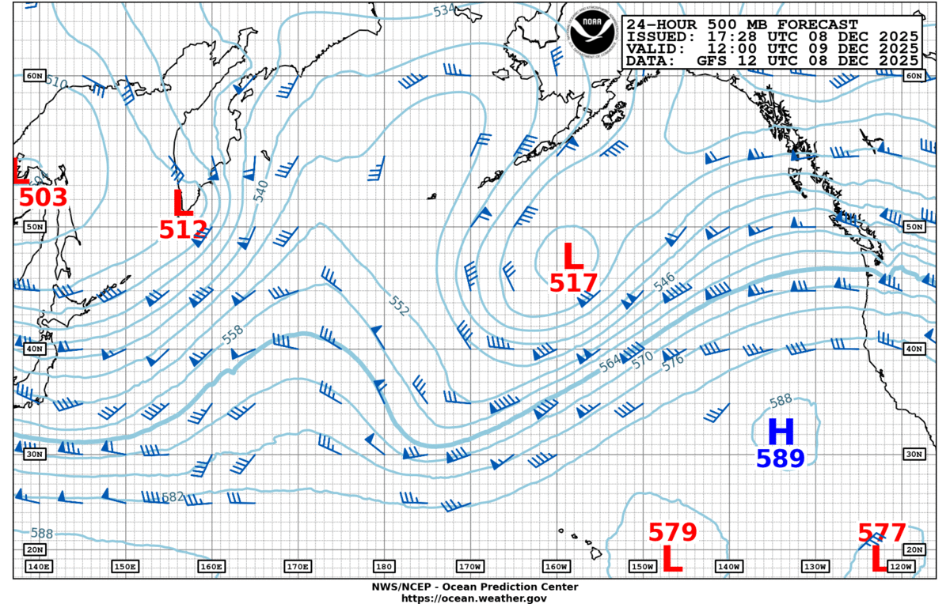
Upper level weather analysis showing a strong jet stream, which carried the atmospheric river, moving into the Pacific Northwest on December 9.

A persistent high pressure system near California blocked inbound weather systems from progressing southward. This caused the cold fronts associated with multiple low pressure systems to stall leading to the formation of an extreme atmospheric river aimed at the Pacific Northwest beginning December 8. For much of the event, the main moisture plume was aimed over Western Washington but it oscillated from Northwest Oregon to the Lower Mainland of British Columbia.

Forecasters at the Center for Western Weather and Water Extremes forecasted the system to reach category 5 on the atmospheric river intensity scale as early as December 5, indicating a high risk of widespread flooding. To improve weather forecasts, the National Weather Service with support from Air Force Reserve 53rd Weather Reconnaissance Squadron sent multiple hurricane hunter flights to collect data from the storm system.

The source region of the moisture plume lead to very warm temperatures. Snow levels rose to above 7,000 ft (2,100 m) above sea level in the impacted region. Snowpack was already near record lows leading up to the event but what snow was present in the mountains rapidly melted due to heavy rain. Temperatures on December 10 soared to record highs with Yakima, Washington recording 72 °F (22 °C).

Periods of strong winds were observed along the Strait of Juan de Fuca and in the Columbia Basin. Wind gusts near 70 mph (110 km/h) were observed early on December 11 in the Tri-Cities area.

On the evening of December 14, another Pineapple Express type atmospheric river arrived in Washington. The atmospheric river was expected to be an AR-4 rated system.

While they don't occur every year, strong atmospheric rivers are common in the Pacific Northwest in the fall and winter. Other major floods from such events include the 2024 British Columbia floods and the 2021 Pacific Northwest floods. On the whole, atmospheric rivers account for 30–50% of the annual precipitation observed in the Pacific Northwest though the majority of atmospheric river events are weaker.

Atmospheric rivers are likely to increase in frequency and severity due to human-caused climate change. In response to the flooding, Montana's state climatologist Kelsey Jensco said, "This is what the future projections and climate modeling portend in terms of changes in our precipitation patterns as well as our temperature patterns." Montana Public Radio reported that atmospheric rivers are projected to become much more common.

== British Columbia ==
Around the start of the floods, Environment Canada issued warnings regarding the impending heavy rainfall set to hit eastern Vancouver Island and the coastal areas of British Columbia. Official forecasts called for around 80 millimetres of rain in some areas. By December 18, 2025, flood warnings were lifted, or in the process of being lifted, in various cities in the Lower Mainland (Abbotsford, Chilliwack, Vancouver and surrounding regions).

=== Lower Mainland ===
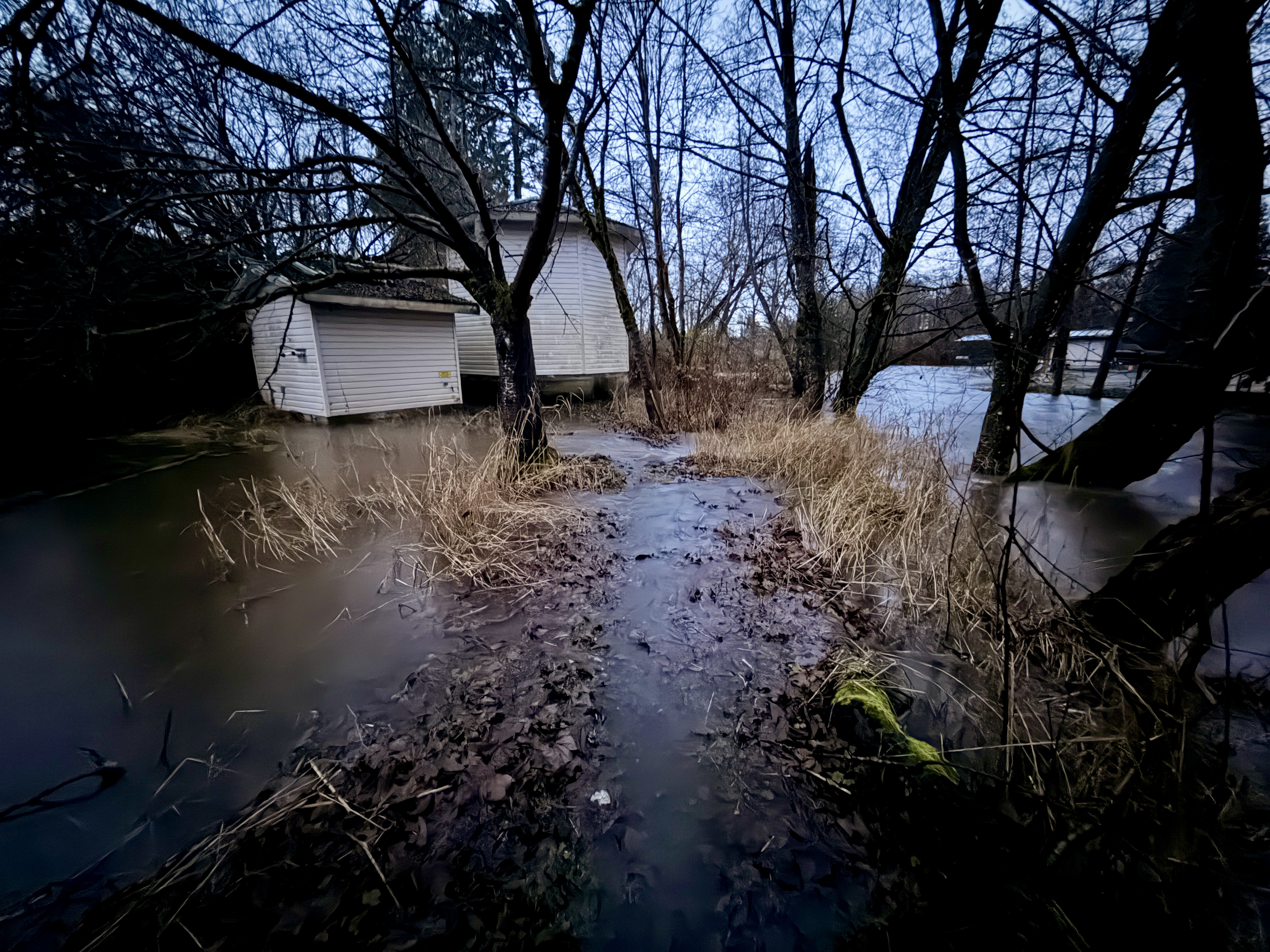
Flooding on the Little Campbell River in Surrey, British Columbia

Rainfall is occurring heavily in Abbotsford and Chilliwack in the Fraser Valley, expected to range around 80 to 110 millimetres. As of December 10, Metro Vancouver isn't as heavily affected by the atmospheric river as the Fraser Valley, but this is still developing.

On December 10, all highways connecting the Lower Mainland to the interior of the province were closed to due flooding, rock falling, and avalanche risks. Only BC Ferries and highways south to the United States were operational.

Semá:th Elementary of School District 34 (Abbotsford) and School District 78 (Hope, Harrison Hot Springs, Agassiz) schools were cancelled Thursday, December 11 due to the flooding. Later that night, Chilliwack School District 33 stated that schools would be cancelled for staff and students on December 12 due to floods creating unsafe and unpredictable travel conditions.

Flooding led to a state of local emergency being declared in portions of the Fraser Valley, Abbotsford and Chilliwack are the most affected. Electoral Area E, just south of Chilliwack, a dozen properties were ordered to evacuate. Highways 1, 7, and 99 were shut down Wednesday night as the storm intensified. Clayburn Village and Sumas Prairie in Abbotsford were ordered to evacuate, leading to over 370 properties affected.

On December 15, a Chilliwack woman was killed by a tree falling in storm winds exceeding 60km/h.

=== Vancouver Island ===
On Vancouver Island, the atmospheric river is expected to range around 40 to 75 millimetres in the Victoria area, with western Vancouver Island expected to reach 110 millimetres of rain. The BC River Forecast centre issued a high streamflow advisory warning for the region.

== Washington ==
Over 300 Washington National Guard members were deployed by December 11 to assist with the flood response and provide assistance and rescues. A state of emergency was declared by governor Bob Ferguson; a federal emergency declaration was approved by president Donald Trump on December 12. Some areas had over 7 inches (180 mm) rainfall over 48 hours as of December 9. A further 4 to 8 inches (100 to 200 mm) was expected at higher elevations on December 10 and 11. In some places the rainfall broke records, such as Olympia Regional Airport, which recorded 3.03 inches (77 mm) on December 8.

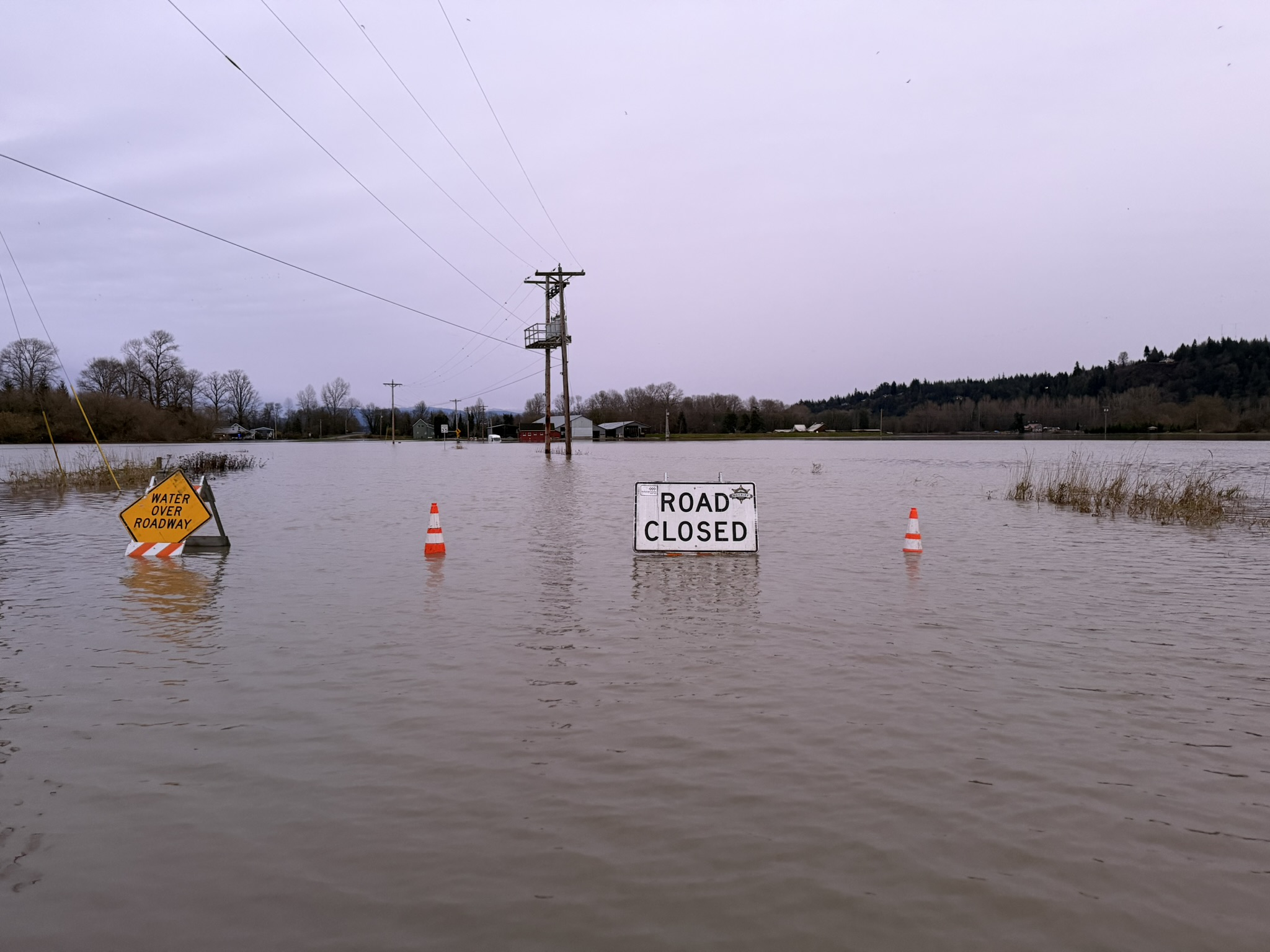
A road and farmland on Florence Island flooded by the Stillaguamish River

On Wednesday, AccuWeather forecasted that "nearly every small stream and short-run river in western Washington and Oregon will reach at least minor to moderate flood stage." Water height gauges broke records for the Yakima River at Easton on Wednesday and Grays River near Rosburg on Monday. The Snohomish River, Skagit River, and Cedar River broke all-time flood records on December 11, while other rivers including the Skykomish, the Stillaguamish and the Snoqualmie fell just short of record highs. The Skagit River is expected to reach a record-high crest of 42 feet (13 m) near Mount Vernon on December 11. On December 10, more than 75,000 people were ordered by Skagit County officials to evacuate, including all of Burlington and parts of Mount Vernon.

Several school districts in Western Washington cancelled all of their classes for several days or had delayed starts.

On December 17, mountainous regions in western Washington were subject to a blizzard warning with a forecast of 18 to 24 inches (46 to 61 cm) of snow at some mountain passes.

=== Transportation impacts ===
Many roads were rendered impassible due to floodwaters. Several major highways were closed due to flooding and mudslides, leaving "almost all routes east from the Pacific Northwest" unusable. Public transit service was also disrupted in some areas; buses near flooded rivers were detoured or cancelled. Amtrak announced the suspension of its trains between Seattle and Vancouver due to the Skagit River's expected flood level. After the floods brought more debris into Elliott Bay in Seattle, the King County Water Taxi system provided crewmembers with goggles that emit infrared light to penetrate the muddier waters and improve visibility.

The 50-mile (80 km) section of U.S. Route 2 that crosses the Cascade Range at Stevens Pass was closed on December 10 between Index and Coles Corner. Several landslides had covered the highway in debris that are planned to be cleared. Governor Bob Ferguson stated that a 49-mile (79 km) section of U.S. Route 2 between Skykomish and Leavenworth would require a closure of "months" to repair damage and washouts. Temporary access between Sevens Pass and Coles Corner was restored on December 29 using a pilot vehicle and one-way traffic. Despite the restoration, tourist traffic is expected to be minimal in towns along U.S. Route 2. The Stevens Pass Ski Area, which lies on the damaged section of U.S. Route 2, plans to open for the ski season. In February, 2026, the government of the Republic of China (Taiwan) made a $200,000 donation for flood damage involving US2 Highway through its diplomatic consular office in Seattle.

Due to highway washouts, the Mt. Baker Ski Area plans to have alternating single-lane access on State Route 542.

A section of Interstate 90 near North Bend was closed on December 9 due to a mudslide that covered the road with debris; it reopened the following day. Several sections of U.S. Route 12 in Lewis County were closed due to flooding, which isolated the town of Randle. The Sumas Border Crossing was closed to southbound commercial traffic to allow local residents to use roads to evacuate. A 6-mile (9.7 km) stretch of State Route 167 has been closed due to a low spot that flooded, creating significant backups on the parallel Interstate 5.

State Route 20 was closed due to mudslides near Winthrop and remained closed on December 14. Although Interstate 90 and U.S. Route 97 reopened after mudslides were cleared, U.S. Route 2 and U.S. Route 12 need substantial repairs to be completed before they can fully reopen. State Route 410 was undercut by floodwaters and the roadway partially collapsed near Enumclaw, but WSDOT installed a temporary signal and reopened the road to limited, one-lane traffic. After State Route 410 was reopened, the Crystal Mountain ski area lifted their temporary daily capacity limits.

=== Chelan County ===
On December 11, the small town of Stehekin lost its water treatment plant and the road from the ferry dock to other parts of the town. It was also out of power after a massive torrent of mud and debris flooded down two small creeks. Due to flooding on the Wenatchee River, Leavenworth was partially flooded and lost power. Winter celebrations in Leavenworth, which usually draw tens of thousands of visitors, were initially canceled and then reinstated on December 15.

=== King County ===
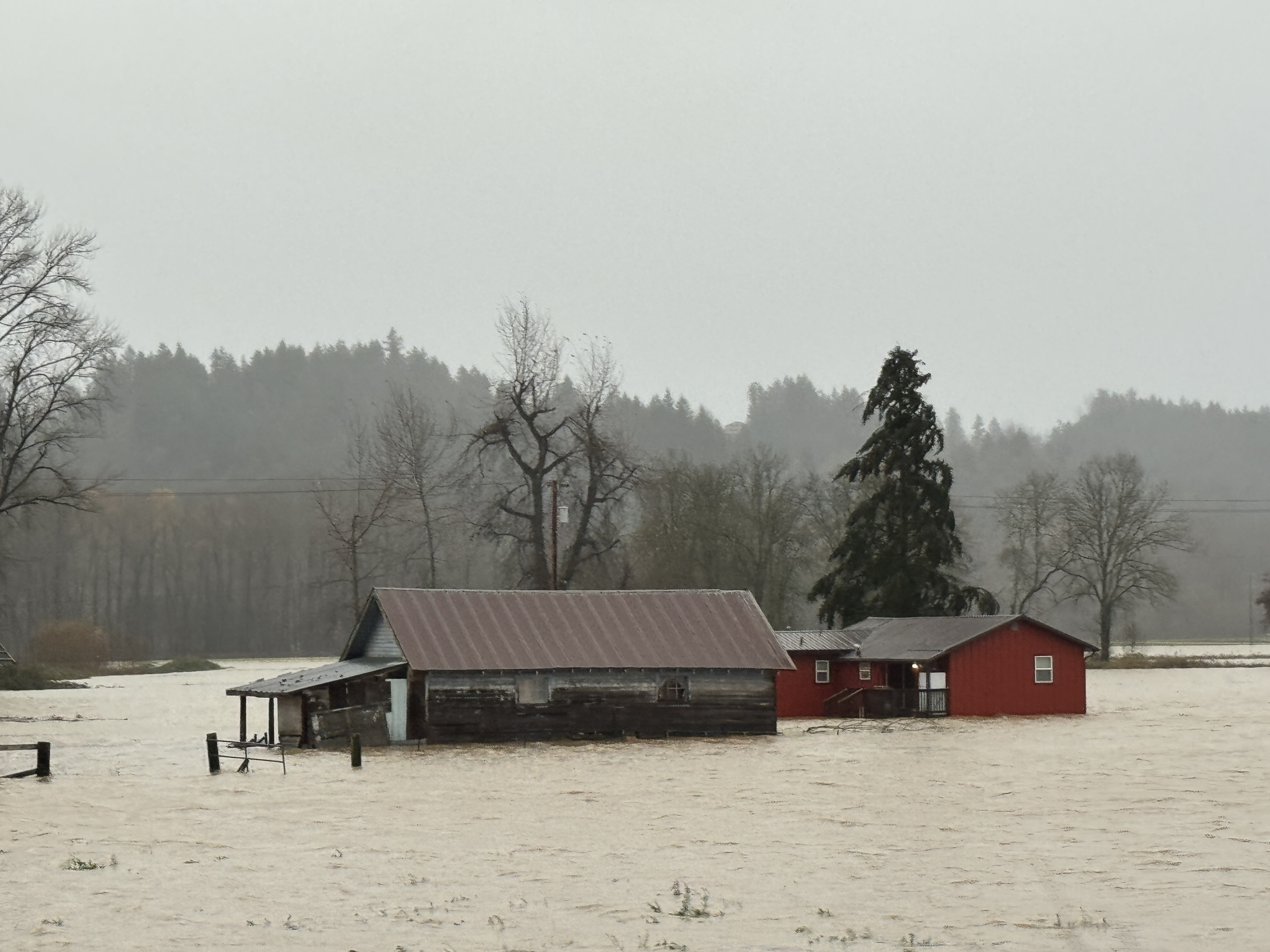
A flooded farm in Kent, Washington

In Kent, both property owners and the city were hastily erecting flood barriers on December 10 as the Green River exceeded its banks adjacent to State Route 181. The Green River flooding also closed some roads in Auburn and Sumner. Parts of Kent and Auburn were evacuated on late December 13 as floodwaters reached a residential area. On December 14 around noon, the Desimone levee was breached leading to another level 3 evacuation in Kent, Auburn, and Tukwila between the Green River and SR 181. Over 46,000 people were within the evacuation zone. City leaders in Kent and Renton criticized the use of a flash flood warning and push notifications as "disproportionate" to the level of danger and inciting a "borderline panic" that closed businesses.

On December 16, 2,100 residents in Pacific, a small town in southern King County, were evacuated in the early morning hours when a White River levee broke.

=== Lewis County ===
In Lewis County, the communities of Randle and Packwood suffered severe flooding when the Cowlitz River "double-crested". U.S. Route 12 was underwater and several people were evacuated along the Cowlitz. A 15-mile (24 km) stretch of US 12, east of Morton, was closed due to water and debris on the highway. Interstate 5 ramps in Napavine were temporarily closed; other roads in the community were overwhelmed and several people were rescued after their vehicles were submerged in the flood waters. Portions of both State Route 6 and State Route 508 in the county were closed due to floodwaters over the roads.

=== Snohomish County ===
A man in Snohomish was found dead in a submerged vehicle in 6 feet (1.8 m) of water early on December 16 beyond a road closure sign on a local road.

=== Whatcom County ===
Whatcom County was heavily affected by the floods. Along the Nooksack River, an estimated 1,248 homes suffered damages from the floods. About 159 of these homes were severely damaged or completely destroyed. Towns that suffered from major damages included Sumas, Nooksack and Everson. Lummi Island was cut off from the rest of the county when flooding closed both Slater Road and Marine Drive, which is the main roadway access to the community. Heavy winds also damaged the ferry dock, limiting another mode of transportation to and from the island. Residents around the Mosquito Lake area were cut off from the rest of the county for 8 days after two bridges leading into the area flooded. The city hall in Everson flooded with about 8 to 10 inches of water damaging the building. The water treatment plant for both the city of Everson and Noocksack was also shut down for several days due to contamination concerns.Four levees sustained damages as results of the floods; Mount Baker Rim and Glacier-Gallup Creeks levees near Glaicer, Twin View levee near Everson, and the Hovander Park levee in Ferndale. Total damage in the county surpassed $23 million, which exceeded damages caused by the 2021 floods.

=== Benton County ===
Benton City and West Richland were affected by flooding as the nearby Yakima River overflowed its banks. State Route 224 in West Richland remained closed for 2 days due to floodwaters reaching up to 2 feet on the road.

== Montana ==
Between December 6 and 11, 12–13 inches (300–330 mm) of rain fell at the Bear Mountain SNOTEL site on the Idaho-Montana border. In the 24 hours ending on December 11, 5–6.5 inches (130–170 mm) of rain had fallen and the Missoula office of the National Weather Service ranked that as the third wettest 24-hour period in 44 years of records.

Starting on December 8, the Fisher and Yaak Rivers reached flood stages. A flooding disaster was declared by Montana's Governor, Greg Gianforte on December 11 for the northwestern corner of the state. The declaration said that Lincoln, Sanders, and Flathead Counties had enacted emergency or disaster declarations.

On December 11, the Lincoln County Health Department posted a boil water order for the city of Libby after floods damaged one of two local dams as well as high turbidity.

Some of the flooding along Highway 2 "touched the Libby Asbestos Superfund site," according to the Flathead Beacon. This prompted concerns that the flooding could spread contaminants but no asbestos disturbances had been discovered as of April 19, 2026.

National Weather Service meteorologist Dan Borsum told the Montana Free Press the weather pattern was "unusual" for mid-December.

== See also ==
- Weather of 2025
- 2025–26 North American winter
