= Oversize permit =

An oversize permit is a document obtained from a state, county, city or province (Canada) to authorize travel in the specified jurisdiction for oversize/overweight truck movement.

In the United States, there are similar yet distinct permits based on overweight and oversized vehicles; oversized is based upon a "nondivisible load or vehicle".

In most cases it will list the hauler's name, the description of the load and its dimensions, an identifying number, and a route they are required to travel.

They may be obtained from the transportation department/agency of the issuing jurisdiction or from a company specializing in transportation permits, called a permit service.

== See also ==
- Oversize load - Truck with unusually large or heavy load
- Permit service - Trucking licensing service
- Traffic safety
- Transportation law
