= 2024 British Columbia floods =

Flood event in British Columbia, Canada

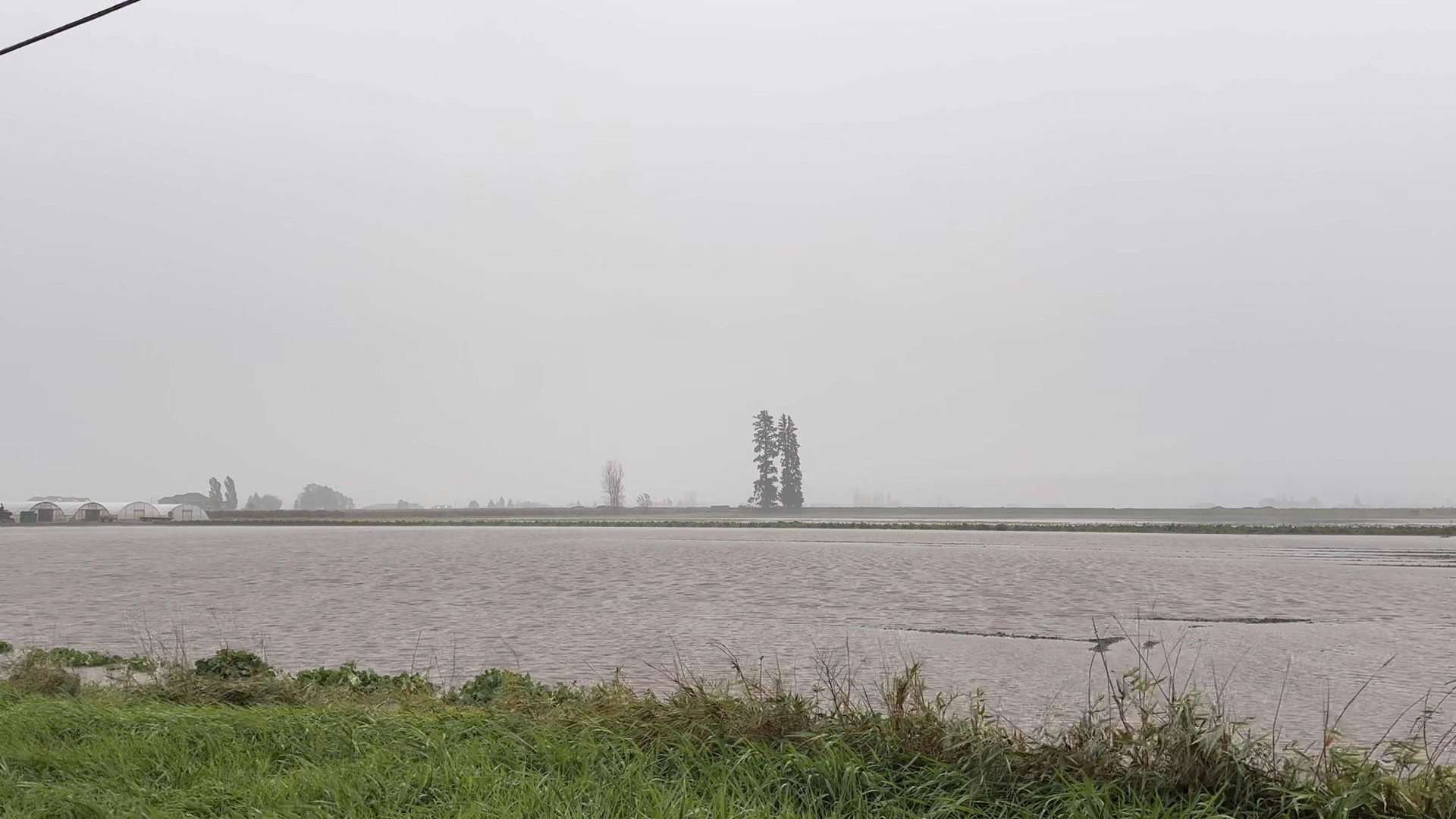
- Flooding in Surrey, British Columbia during the storm.
- Date: October 18, 2024 – October 20, 2024 (2 days)
- Location: Southern British Columbia, Canada Northwestern Washington, United States
- Cause: Atmospheric river
- Deaths: 4
- Property damage: $110,000,000

For the most recent series of floods, see the 2025 British Columbia floods.

The 2024 British Columbia floods were a series of floods, debris flows, and mudslides caused by an atmospheric river that struck Southwestern British Columbia from October 18 to October 20, 2024. Four people were killed during the event, two in the Lower Mainland and two on Vancouver Island.

The storm also brought heavy snow to inland portions of the province with major highways having been closed. Northwestern Washington was on the southern edge of the atmospheric river. There, strong winds knocked out power to thousands and minor flooding led to road closures in some areas.

The low pressure system that produced the atmospheric river moved into Alberta during the following days leading to the first snowfall of the season in parts of that province.

== Meteorological synopsis ==
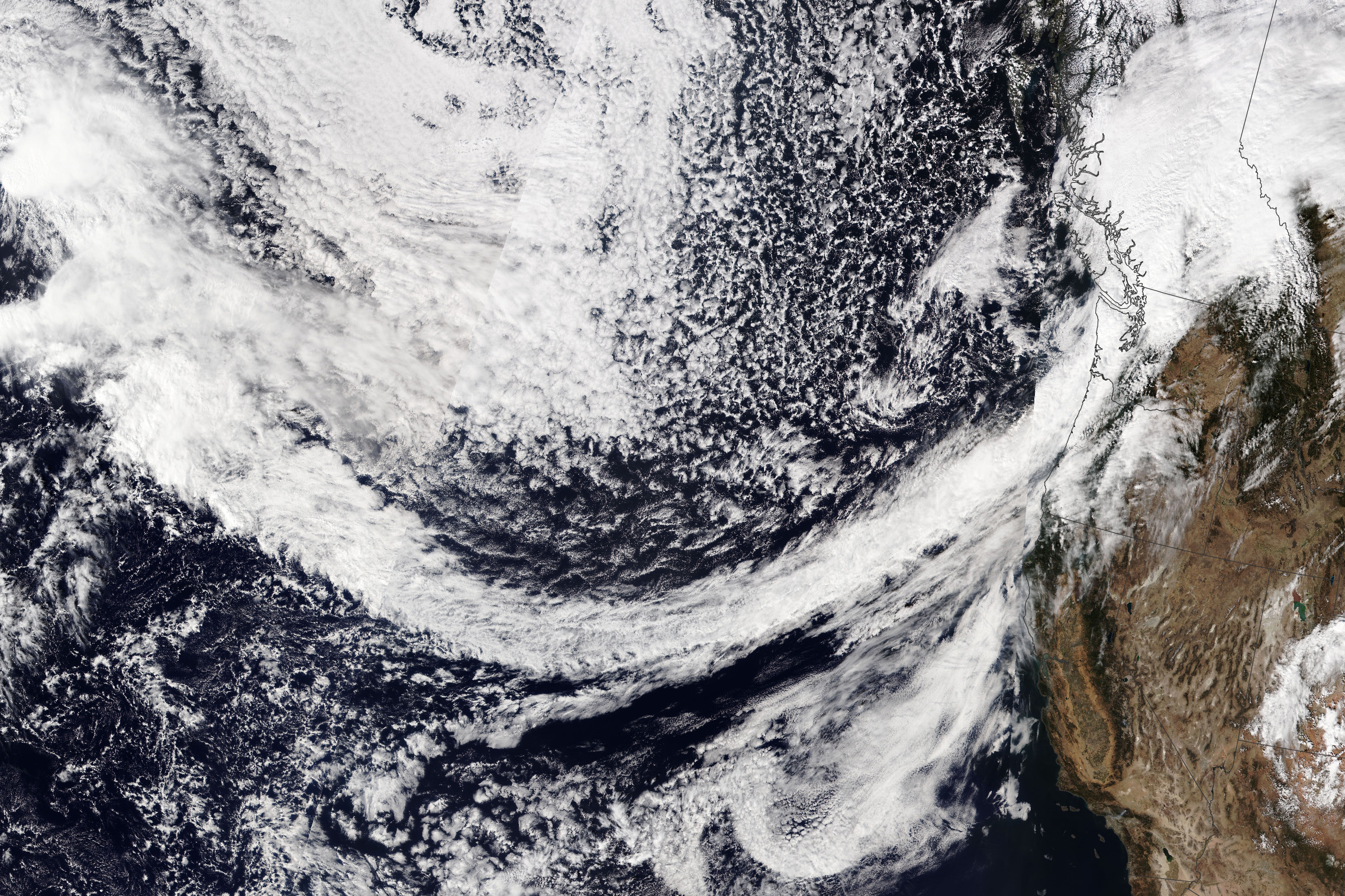
NASA satellite photo showing the atmospheric river

A strong low pressure system developed in the Gulf of Alaska in the days leading up to the event, pulling a cold front along with it. The motion of the low stalled the cold front and associated moisture plume with heavy rain being observed in the Lower Mainland and Vancouver Island. The Olympic Peninsula of Washington state also received heavy rain.

The moisture reached southwestern British Columbia on October 18. It wasn't until October 20 when a new low pressure system captured the cold front and swept the system eastward. Chinook winds were observed in Alberta while heavy precipitation was falling in British Columbia before the system moved eastward and brought snow to Calgary and Edmonton on October 21. This was Calgary's first snowfall of the season.

Atmospheric river events are common in British Columbia and Washington during the cold season. September 2024 brought one to the North Coast that is believed to have been the most intense in the Northeastern Pacific in the satellite record that goes back to 2000. Between British Columbia and Southeast Alaska, an average of 35 atmospheric rivers make landfall annually.

== Preparations ==
A couple days before the floods, Environment Canada issued a rainfall warning due to an atmospheric river expected to "drench the B.C. coast" through the weekend of October 18. Official forecasts called for rainfall totals in excess of 200 mm (7.9 in) in some areas. The British Columbia River Forecast Centre issued flood watches for numerous areas and authorities highlighted the risk of landslides and power outages.

Farmers and residents of the Sumas Prairie area between Abbotsford and Chilliwack were "preparing for the worst." This area was especially hard hit by and still recovering from the 2021 Pacific Northwest floods, which were caused by a series of atmospheric rivers.

The timing of the atmospheric river coincided with the 2024 British Columbia general election on October 19. Elections BC engaged in preparations ahead of the event to ensure voting accessibility by having power and paper backups in place in case of power outages. A record number of people participated in early voting for the election, limiting the storm's impact.

== Impact ==
Burke Mountain in Coquitlam recorded a storm total of 256 mm (10.1 in) from October 18 through the evening of October 20. West Vancouver also reported rain in excess of 200 mm (7.9 in). Kennedy Lake on Vancouver Island saw over 318 mm (12.5 in) of rainfall. The South Coast region of British Columbia saw higher rainfall amounts than those seen during the record breaking floods in 2021.

The trajectory of the moisture plume limited the impact of the Olympic Mountain rain shadow in parts of British Columbia. At the same time, this event came earlier in the season than the 2021 event meaning there was less snowpack in the mountains to be melted. Localized severe flooding was observed but river flooding was not as strong or widespread as in 2021.

ICBC, the crown corporation providing car insurance in British Columbia, said it received 80 claims for water damaged vehicles – a value far lower than the 2,100 claims made following the 2021 flood event.

=== Lower Mainland ===
Rainfall in the Lower Mainland was heaviest on October 19. This was accompanied by strong winds that led to 2,700 BC Hydro customers remaining without power by that evening. Widespread street flooding was observed in North Shore communities. Flows of muddy water and debris were noted in West Vancouver and TransLink riders encountered detours and delays.

Street flooding led to the closure of several roads in Surrey. A few water rescues had to be performed throughout the Lower Mainland. Ponding water forced lane closures on area freeways, including Highway 1 and Highway 99. Highway 7 was closed for a time between Mission and Maple Ridge.

A 57 year old woman was killed in Coquitlam when a mudslide struck her home. Her body was found after an extensive search involving the RCMP and other agencies. A man was killed, also in Coquitlam, when he entered the Coquitlam River attempting to rescue a dog. Six homes were evacuated in the District of North Vancouver when heavy rain in Deep Cove overwhelmed the stormwater system. North Vancouver declared a state of emergency for impacted neighbourhoods.

Increased turbidity was seen in Metro Vancouver tap water but officials said it was still safe to drink. There were isolated instances of the sewer system overflowing with fourteen reports of raw sewage entering into area waterways.

=== Vancouver Island ===
Heavy rain on Vancouver Island also caused localized flooding there. Some BC Ferries routes saw cancellations due to strong winds. Highway 4 between Port Alberni and Ucluelet on the West Coast was closed when debris flowed onto the roadway. Washouts along Highway 14 led to that road being closed between Jordan River and Port Renfrew with repair work expected to last until October 23.

Two travelers went missing between Port Alberni and Bamfield during the storm. Both were found to have been killed when their vehicles went into the Sarita River due to Bamfield Road having washed out. Investigators utilized cell phone data and helicopter searches in their attempts to locate the individuals.

=== Interior and Northern British Columbia ===
Areas of heavy snow were observed inland in British Columbia due to the atmospheric river. Environment Canada meteorologists issued the first snowfall warnings of the season along the British Columbia – Yukon border where 20 cm (7.9 in) of snow was forecast. Highway 1 was closed over Rogers Pass east of Revelstoke because of a vehicle crash in the wintry conditions.

=== Northwestern Washington ===
Strong winds on the south side of the atmospheric river knocked out power to over 24,000 customers in Northwestern Washington. The majority of these outages were seen in Clallam County. Wind gusts to 45 mph (72 km/h) caused a tree to fall on a home in Sudden Valley near Bellingham. No injuries or deaths related to the storm were reported in Washington.

High water and damage from strong winds impacted travel in Whatcom County with several road closures. The daily rainfall record for October 19 at Quillayute Airport near Forks was broken when 4.68 in (119 mm) was recorded. Bellingham International Airport also set a new record on that day with a total of 1.97 in (50 mm).

== See also ==
- British Columbia floods
