= Van der Vlist =

Dutch abnormal load specialist company

Van der Vlist Transportgroep
- Company type: Private company
- Industry: Transport and Logistics
- Founded: 1930
- Headquarters: Groot-Ammers, Netherlands
- Key people: Nico Van der Vlist, Dirk Van der Vlist
- Website: www.vandervlist.com

Van der Vlist Transport group is an abnormal load specialist and logistical services provider, based in Groot-Ammers, Netherlands.

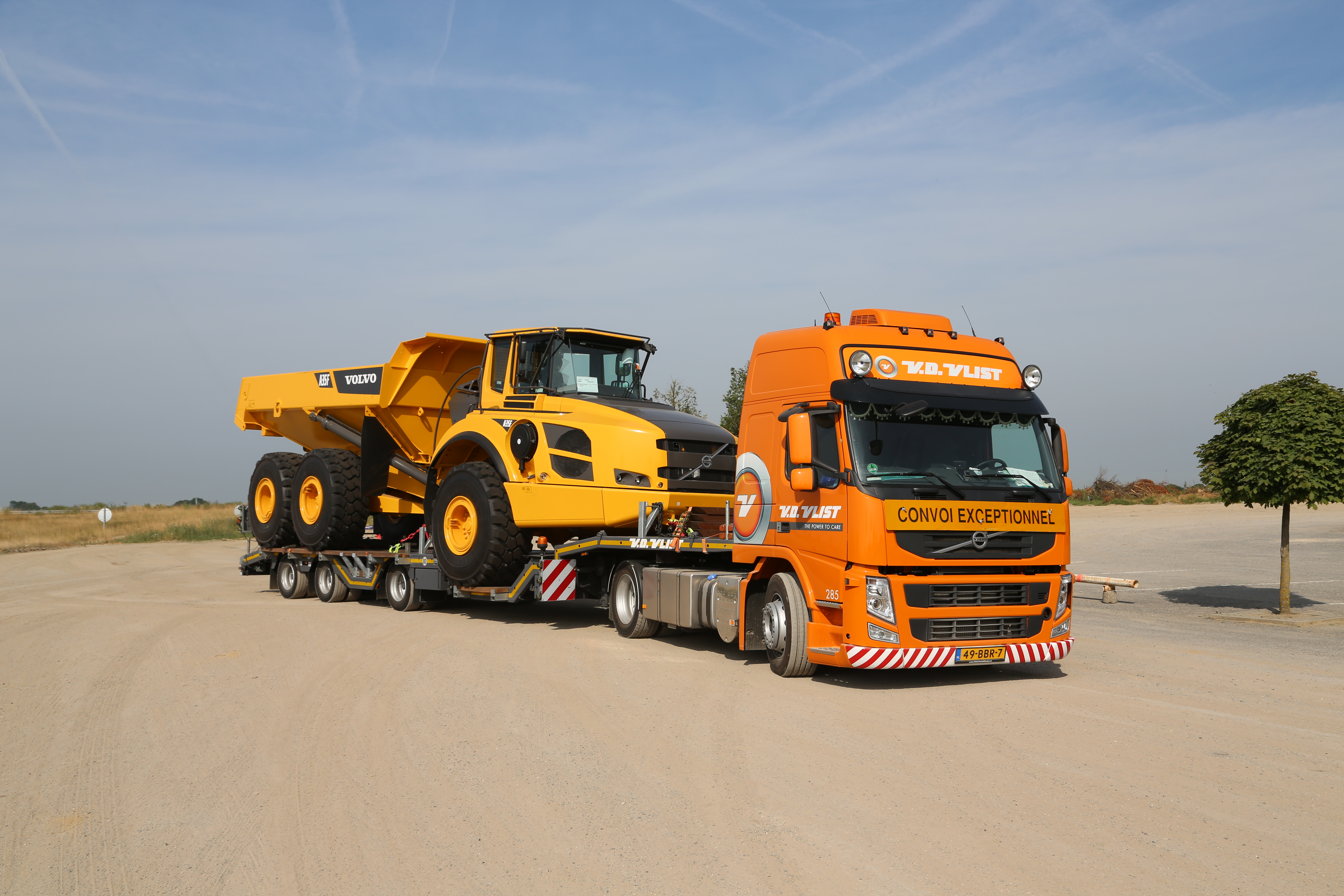
Special transport

== History ==
Van der Vlist was founded in 1930 in Hoogblokland as a road haulage company, building materials, livestock and straw. In the 1960s they began to develop low bed trailers, which led to a focus on heavy transport as they expanded into the 1990s.

From 1990 Van der Vlist began to further expand, moving to their current facility at Groot-Ammers, acquiring their own terminal at Moerdijk, developing multimodal links, creating storage facilities and developing Technical Services.

After this development, Van der Vlist began the 21st Century by developing its project management service, and gaining accreditations. Nowadays they are specialists in transporting various types of machinery across Europe.

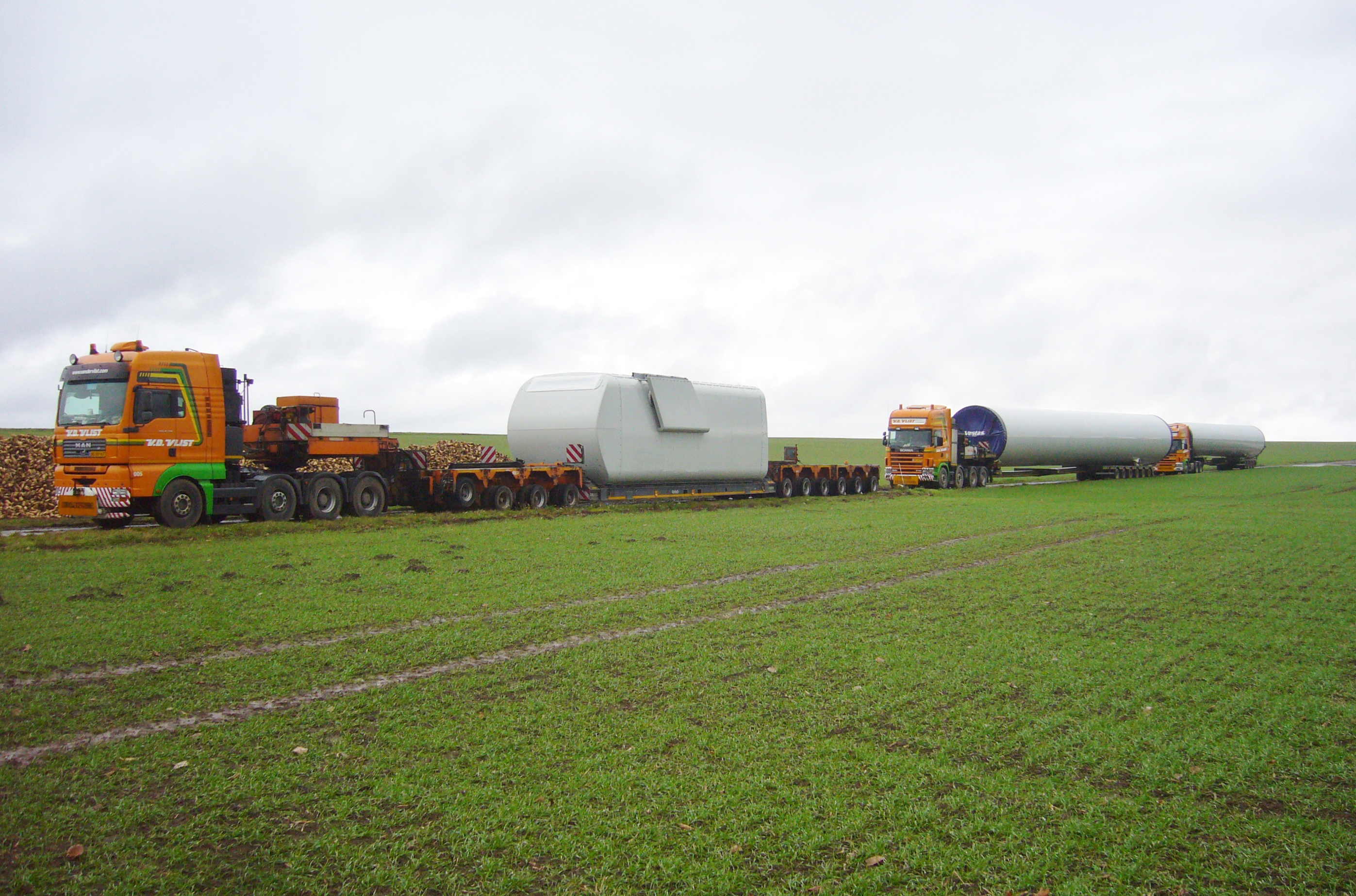
Modular transport

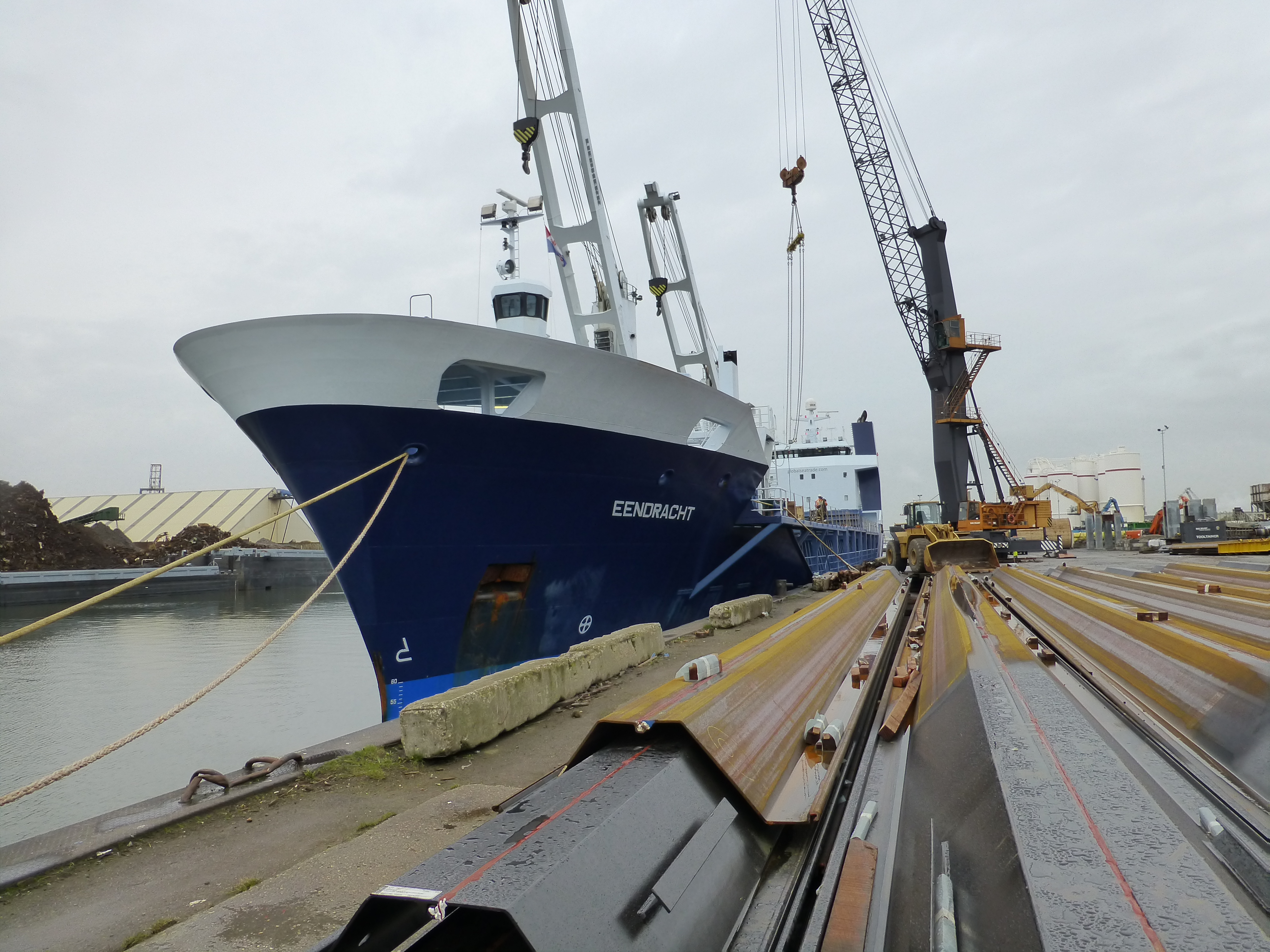
Moerdijk quay

== Offices ==
Netherlands – Groot-Ammers, Schelluinen, Moerdijk, Assen (Holtrop-Van der Vlist) and Rijssen

Belgium – Zeebrugge

United Kingdom – Hull

Poland – Poznan

Spain - Barcelona

Germany - Schermbeck

France - Algolsheim
