= Mosquito Lake (Whatcom County, Washington) =

Lake in Whatcom County, Washington, USA

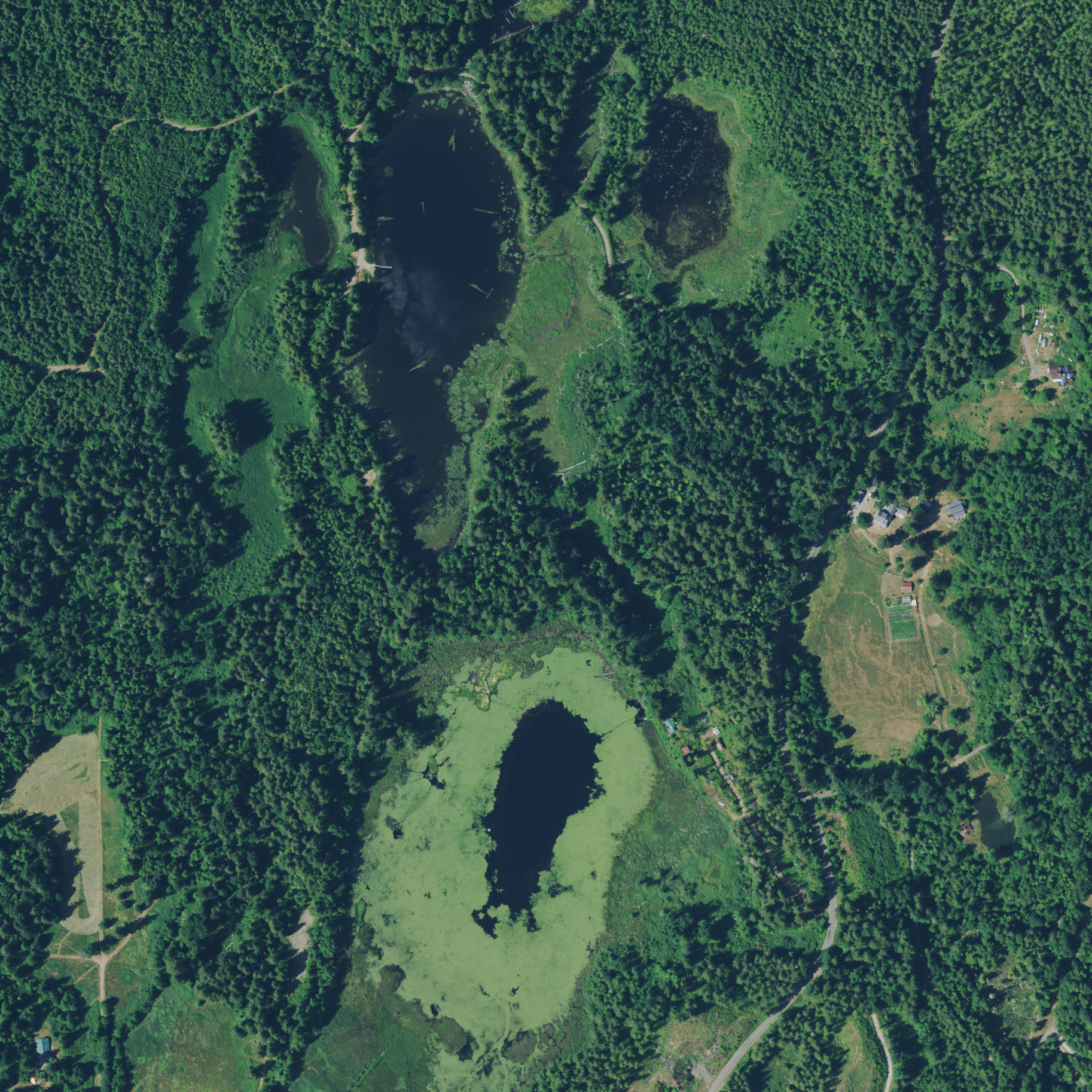
- Mosquito Lake to the north, with Jorgensen lake to the south
- Interactive map of Mosquito Lake
- Location: Whatcom County, Washington
- Coordinates: 48°46′09″N 122°07′14″W
- Type: lake
- Basin countries: United States
- Surface elevation: 663 ft (202 m)

Mosquito Lake is a lake in the U.S. state of Washington, south of the Middle Fork Nooksack River, along Mosquito Lake Road.

Mosquito Lake was named by Charles M. Park in 1885 for the abundance of mosquitoes near the lake.

== See also ==
- List of lakes in Washington
