= Escort vehicle =

Vehicle used to escort larger vehicles

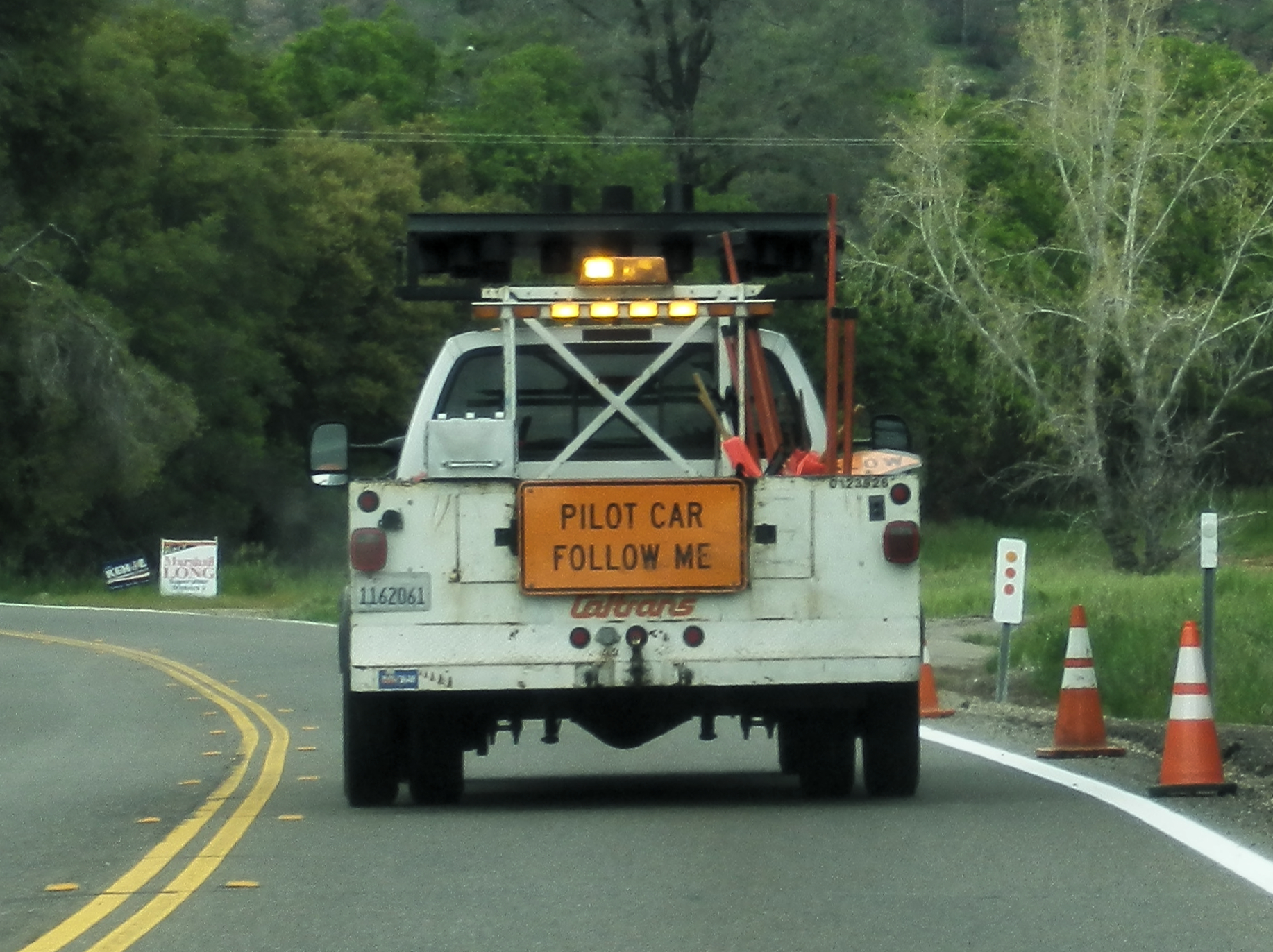
An escort vehicle in California

An escort vehicle, also called a pilot vehicle in most areas, is an automobile used to alert other road users of an upcoming trucks with large loads, convoys of large vehicles or to guide motorists through construction sites. They are also used to guide aircraft taxiing from the runway to the apron at many airports. In most instances, pilot vehicles are provided by companies that specialize in convoy escort, although escort duties are occasionally performed by police vehicles (especially for parades and funeral processions or shipments that require a high level of security during transit). Some escort companies have special authority for traffic control through state approval.

== Oversize vehicle escorts ==
Pilot/escort vehicles are public safety vehicles; they are also considered a warning device to forewarn the public of a potential danger. They are usually equipped with a C.B. radio, or other two-way radios to communicate with each other. On a two-lane road, a load with one escort has the escort vehicle take position in front of the load being escorted. On a four (or more) lane road, the escort then transitions to a position behind the load being escorted. Depending on the size of the load, the load may require more escorts, usually one in the front and one in the rear.

For overwidth or overheight trucks one escort vehicle will drive 2500' to 1 miles ahead of the truck to ensure the road ahead can accommodate the truck's oversize dimensions. This lead vehicle is usually equipped with a long pole (high-pole) that extends upward from the front bumper; its length is adjusted six to eight inches above the height of the truck's load or the tallest part of the load within a convoy. If the pole strikes any overhanging objects such as bridges, overhead signs, or power lines, the truck or convoy can be alerted and stopped or diverted long before an accident occurs.

In Australia all oversize equipment is imported in pieces on cargo ships; the components are then loaded onto trucks that are powerful enough to haul the extremely heavy machinery. In New South Wales, oversize trucks are only allowed to operate between 11 pm and 5 am. If the truck is still in transit by 5 am, it must by law pull over to a safe area and wait until 11 pm to continue its journey.

Along the predetermined route, which is already safe-proof from narrow roads and low objects through many years of transportation of heavy oversize machines, the front escort must have amber safety lights that can be seen from 360° and from at least 500 feet. A sign displaying "Oversize Load" must be on the front and the rear of the escort vehicle, or one sign that displays "Oversize Load" on both sides may be mounted on top of the vehicle, the sign must be at least 5 feet wide and 12 inches high, with eight inch letters with a 2-inch brush stroke. The front escort is to ensure that oncoming vehicles are warned of the oversized load approaching. Because it is illegal for the front pilot/escort to cross the line into the oncoming lane, it can be difficult to get traffic to stop for something such as a narrow bridge, so the front escort usually goes far enough in advance to warn the truck driver via C.B. radio about the oncoming traffic so the driver can stop before the bridge until the front driver relays back to the driver that it is safe to cross without the fear of oncoming traffic. The rear pilot/escort may perform duties such as staying in one or more lanes other than the lanes that the truck and load are occupying, to block traffic off while the truck and trailer make their turn. The rear escort may also make sudden lane changes, usually because the truck needs to change lanes because of a lane ending or obstruction in the road ahead, or one or more vehicles parked on the shoulder of the road. In the UK in 2017 Heavy Transport Association launched a road safety initiative centered on two new Certificates of Competence issued by the City & Guilds for the drivers and managers of abnormal load Escorts. The aim of the initiative is to improve public safety through training of abnormal load escorts leading to improved competence. At the moment anyone 21 or over with a car licence, a vehicle, some amber flashing lights and an Abnormal Load sign can become an escort without any training, knowledge of the legislation or a check of competence. There are two levels of courses City & Guilds Level 2 Certificate of Competence in Abnormal Loads (Escort Driver) and City & Guilds Level 3 Certificate of Competence in Abnormal Loads (Escort Manager) aimed to improve road safety and to equip individuals with the required skills to sufficiently undertake the task of escorting abnormal loads or abnormal load vehicles.
