= Oversize load =

Truck with unusually large or heavy load

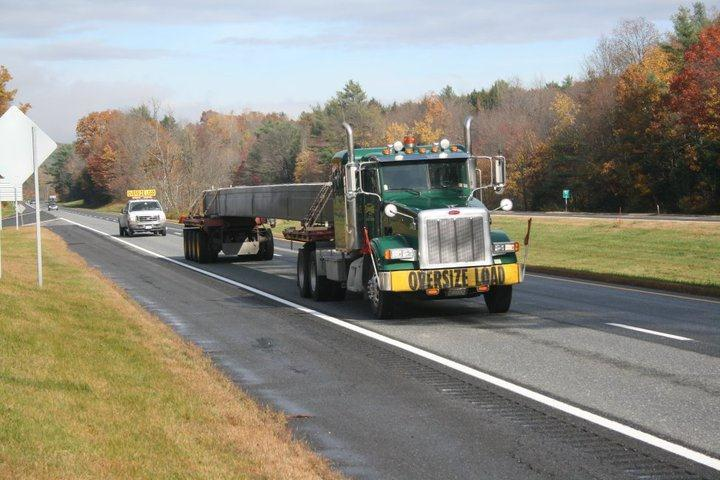
Long bridge beam oversize load with pilot car escort

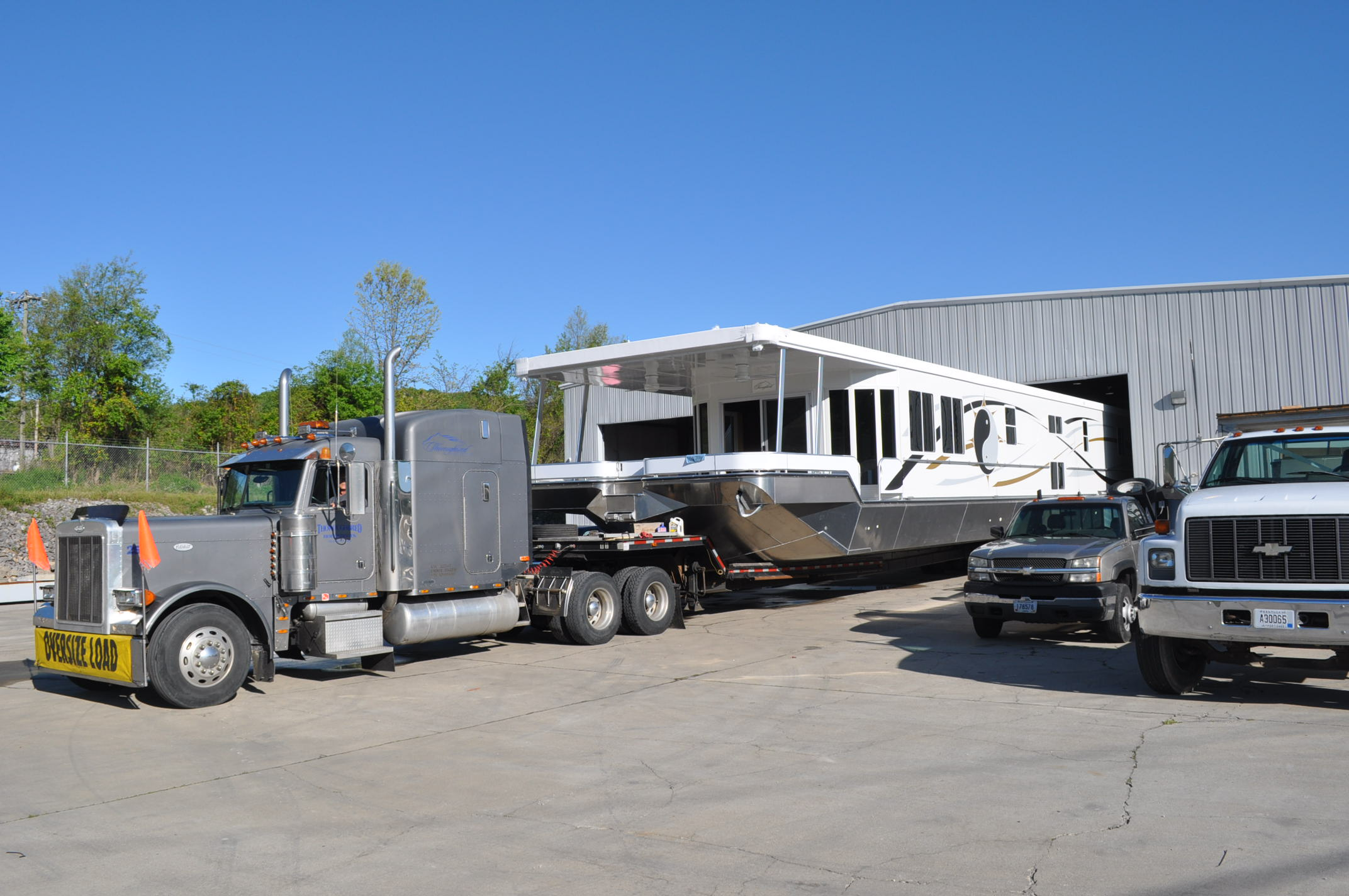
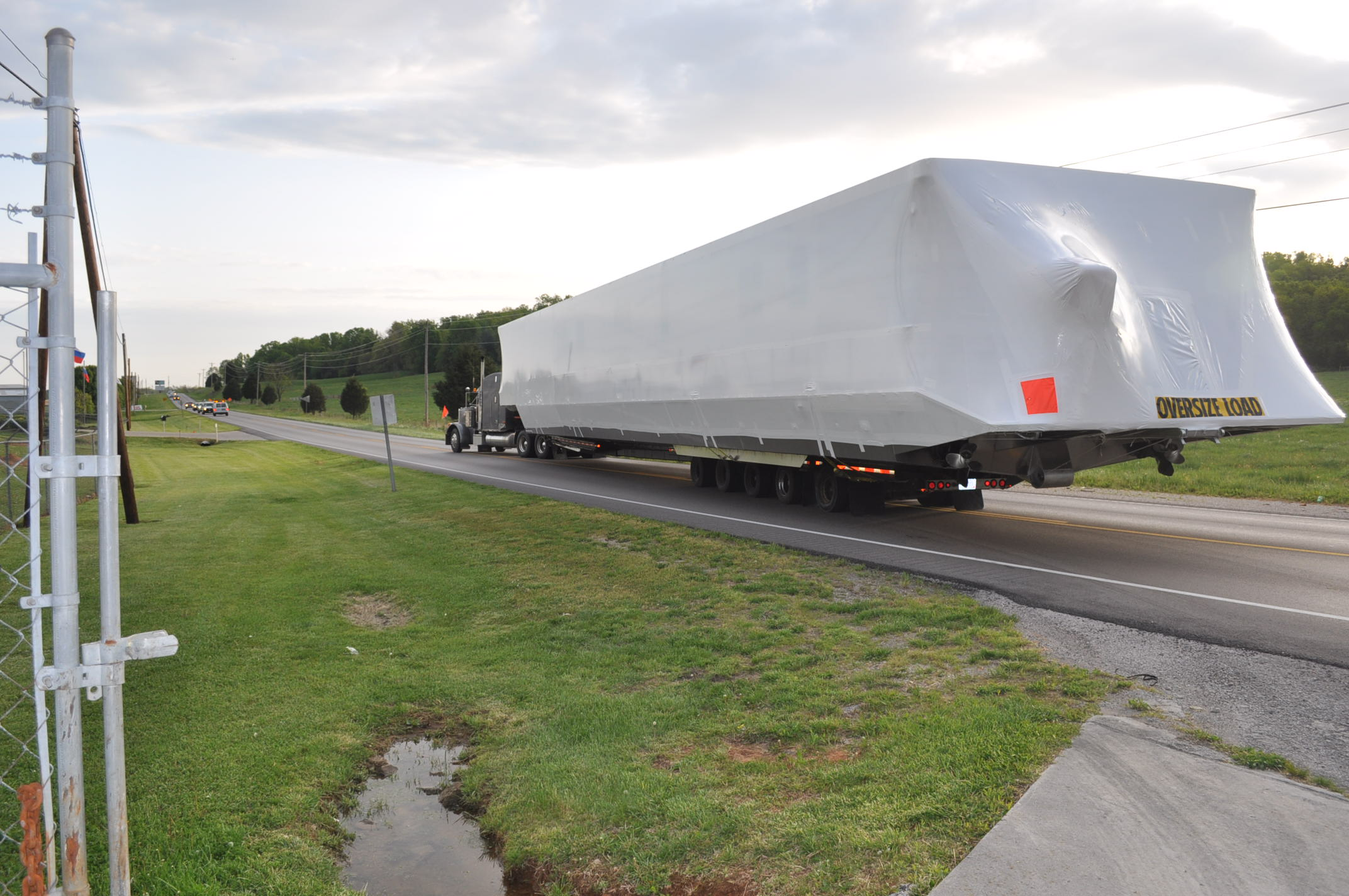
Houseboat on the move, Monticello, Kentucky

In road transport, an oversize load (or overweight load) is a load that exceeds the standard or ordinary legal size or weight limits for a truck to convey on a specified portion of road, highway, or other transport infrastructure, such as air freight or water freight. In Europe, it may be referred to as special transport or heavy and oversized transportation. There may also be load-per-axle limits. However, a load that exceeds the per-axle limits but not the overall weight limits is considered overweight. Examples of oversize or overweight loads include construction machines (cranes, front loaders, backhoes, etc.), pre-built homes, containers, and construction elements (bridge beams, generators, windmill propellers, rocket stages, and industrial equipment).

== Overview ==
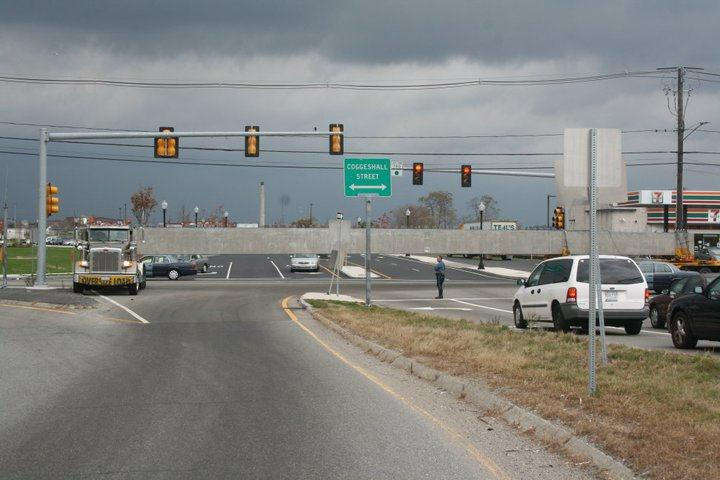
125 feet (38 m) long oversize load "Superload"

The legal dimensions and weights vary between countries and regions within a country. A vehicle which exceeds the legal dimensions usually requires a special permit which requires extra fees to be paid in order for the oversize or overweight vehicle to legally travel on the roadways. The permit usually specifies a route the load must follow as well as the dates and times during which the load may travel.

When a load cannot be dismantled into units that can be transported without exceeding the limitations in terms of the dimensions and mass, it is classified as an abnormal load. Another definition can be summarized as follows: an abnormal indivisible load (AIL) is one which cannot be divided into two or more loads for transporting (on roads). Also, break bulk is used to define the freight that cannot be loaded into any ocean container or too large for air cargo.

Any road transport is framed by the CMR Convention (Convention on the Contract for the International Carriage of Goods by Road), which relates to various legal issues concerning transportation of cargo, predominantly by lorries, by road.

== Cargo loading and securement ==
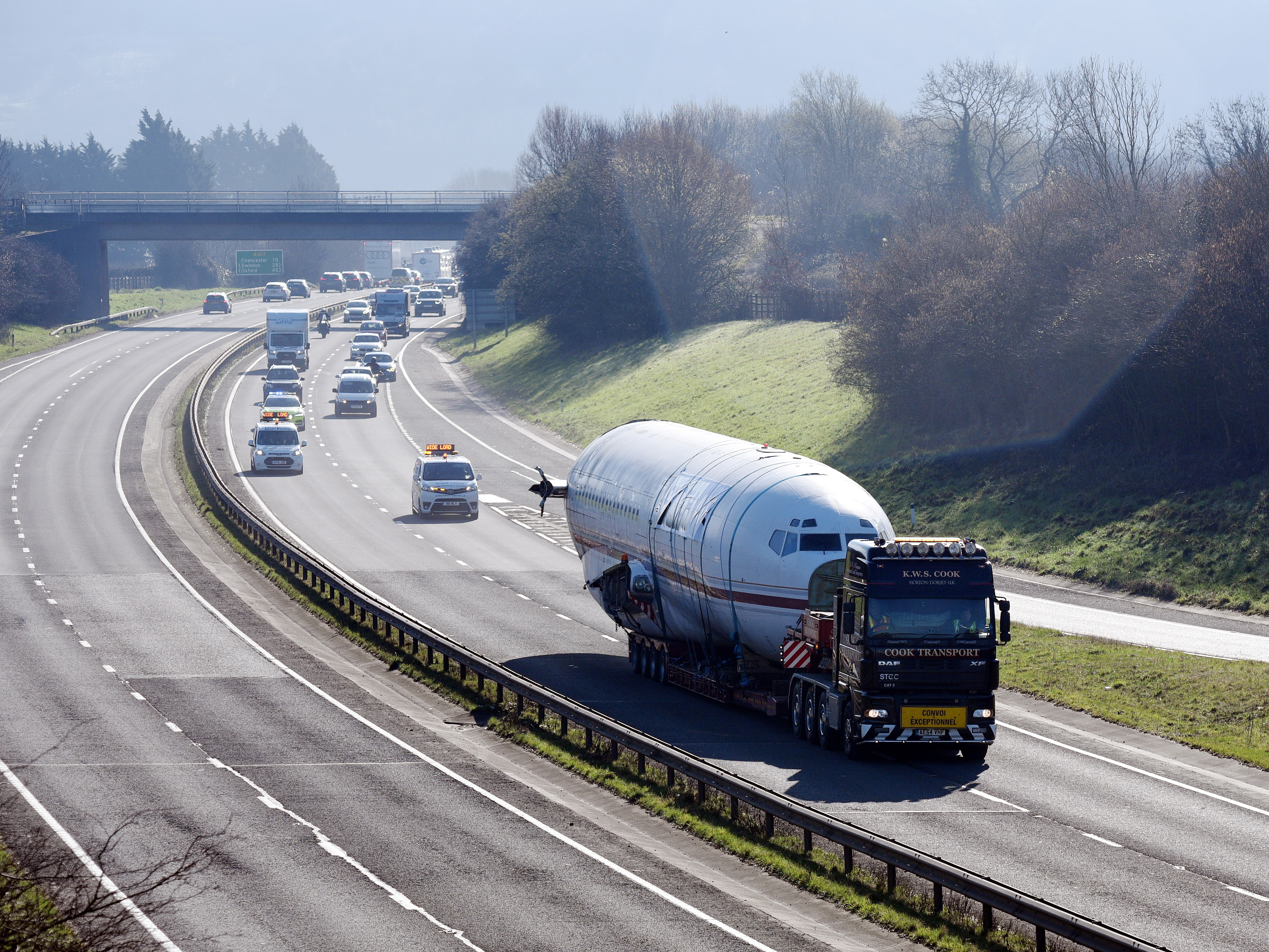
Boeing 727 fuselage being transported by a lorry, with escort including police, on the M5 motorway, England

According to the Federal Motor Carrier Safety Administration, National Highway Traffic Safety Administration, Large Truck Crash Causation Study 7% of US trucking accidents are caused by improper cargo securement or cargo shifts. Shifting cargo can cause the truck to destabilize or the load can fall off completely leading to serious public safety issues.

Load shifting is prohibited by law and it is the responsibility of the shipper, motor carrier, driver, receiver, and the securing device manufacturer to ensure the cargo is completely secured.

== International perspectives ==
In a specific country, the roads are built in a way that allows a vehicle with dimensions within the standard legal limits to safely (though not necessarily easily) drive and turn. Roads that do not allow large vehicles may be marked with the traffic signs. These may include per-axle load, height, width, or overall length limits.

=== Australia ===
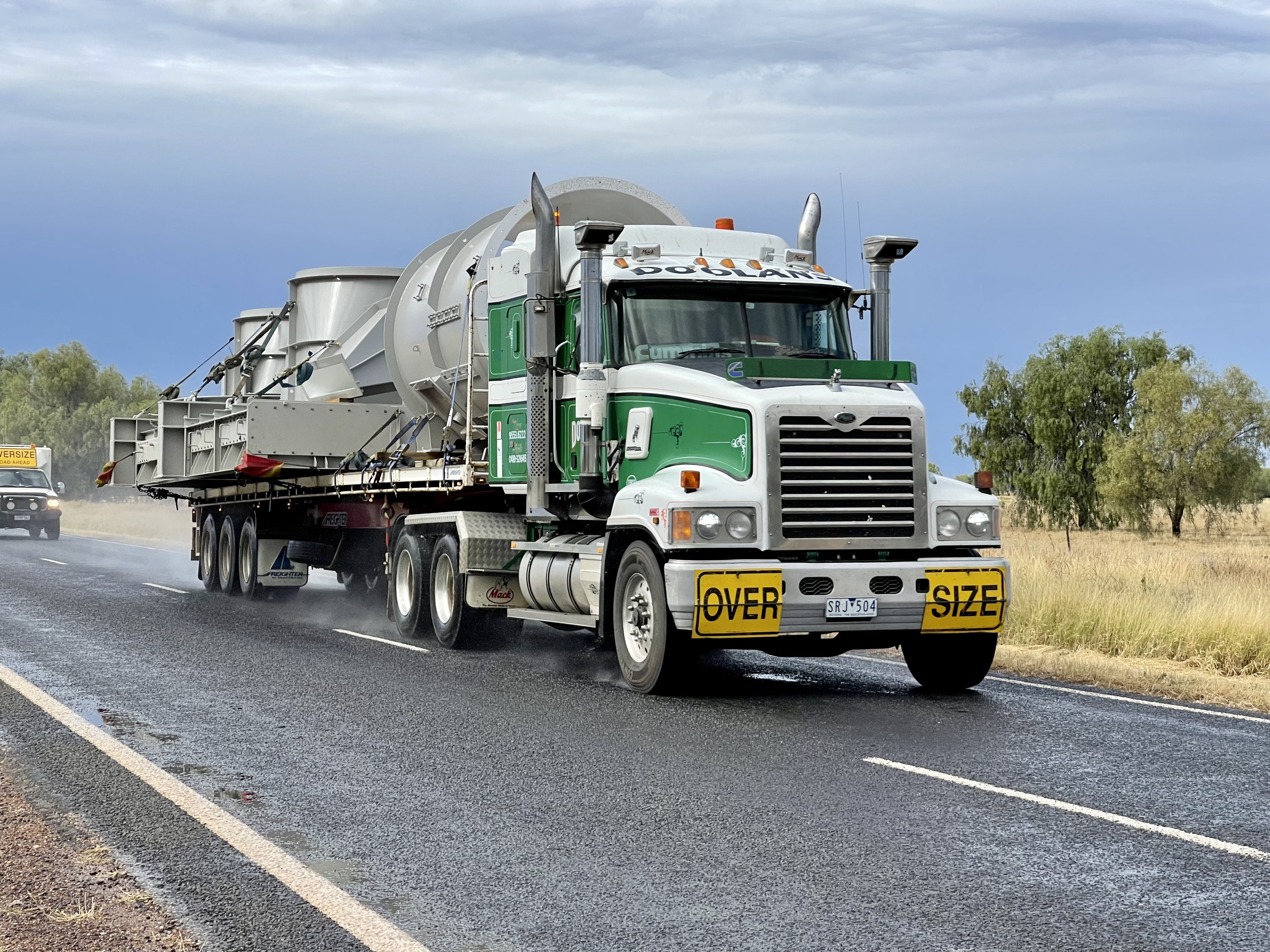
Oversized load on Carnarvon Highway, Queensland

There is a huge number of trailer combinations used in Australia, each has its own weight and dimension limits. Most of the combinations are mentioned with their limitations, if one hauls anything exceeding these limits will have to go through a notice or permit based system. These oversize permits and notice have national and state based system depending upon the load and configuration type.

Combination	Width (m)	Height (m)	Length (m)
Rigid	2.5	4.3	12.5
Tractor Trailer	2.5	4.3	19
Livestock	2.5	4.6	19
Car carrier	2.5	4.6	25
Double-decker bus	2.5	4.4	12.5
Articulated bus	2.5	4.3	18
B-double	2.5	4.3	25
Road train	2.5	4.3	53.5

=== Canada ===
In Canada legal load size has limited to width of 2.6 m (8.6 ft), height of 4.2 m (13.7 ft) (including the loading platform) and length of 23.0 m (75.5 ft) anything that exceeds these limits is considered as an oversize load in every province of Canada. Permits have to be obtained by different provinces. In most province, load exceeding 90ft in length, 4.3 m (14 ft) in height and 4.0 m (13 ft) width must move with escort vehicles, signs and flags.

=== Egypt ===
Ministry of Transportation (MOT) of Egypt has limitations on what dimension and weight of vehicle can move on roads and bridge network of the nation, anything exceeding these limits is classified as oversize or overweight. Permissible limits are of length of 12 m (39 ft) for rigid, 17 m (56 ft) for semi-trailer, 20 m (66 ft) for tractor trailer combination with height of 4 m (13 ft) including the combination and 2.5 m (8.2 ft) width. maximum GVW of a combination is set to 60 tons with different per axle limits.

=== Europe ===
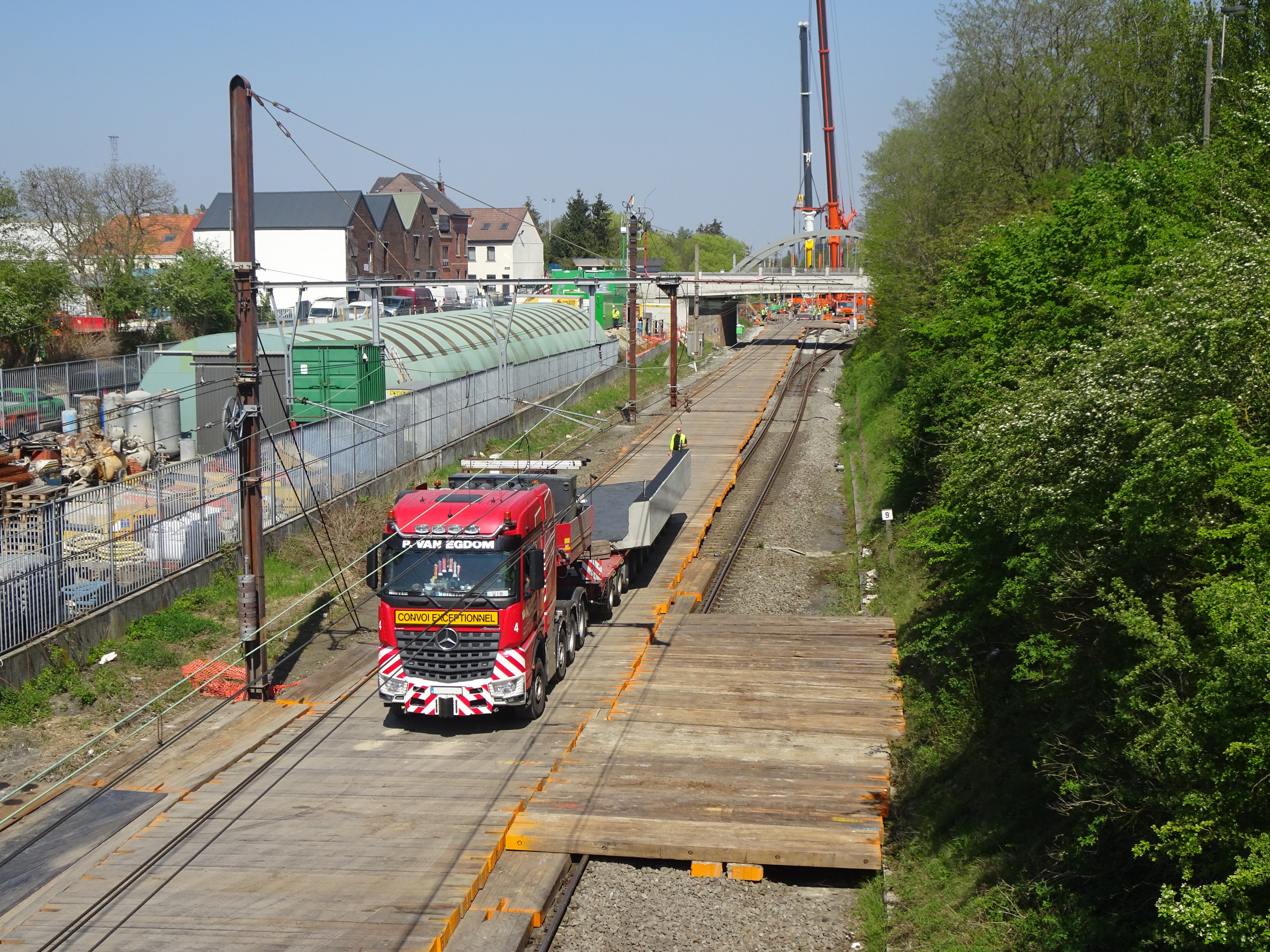
Belgium. Railroad bridge span being moved (backwards); the tracks have been covered with thick boards.

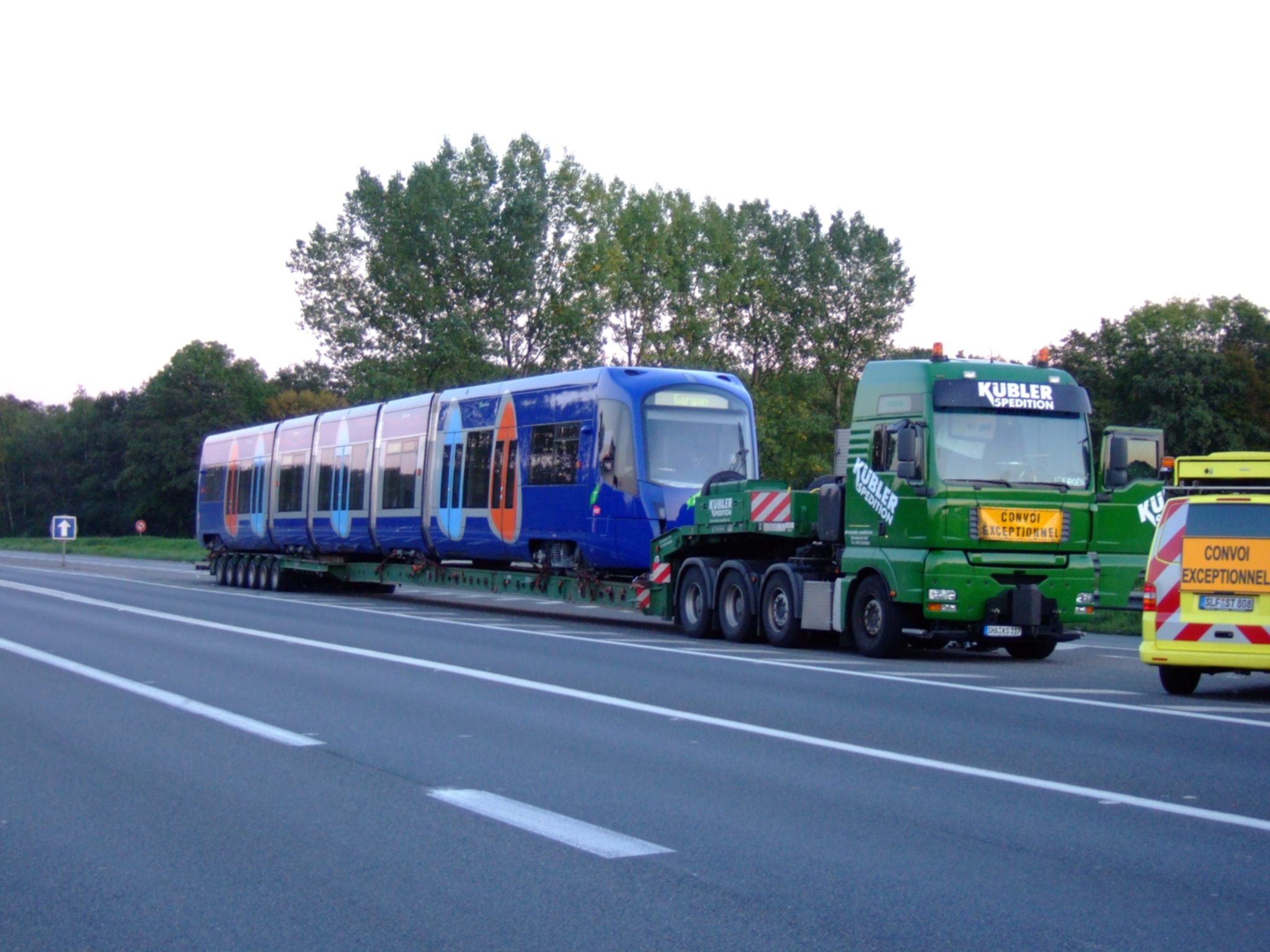
Delivery trip of a brand-new Île-de-France tram-train

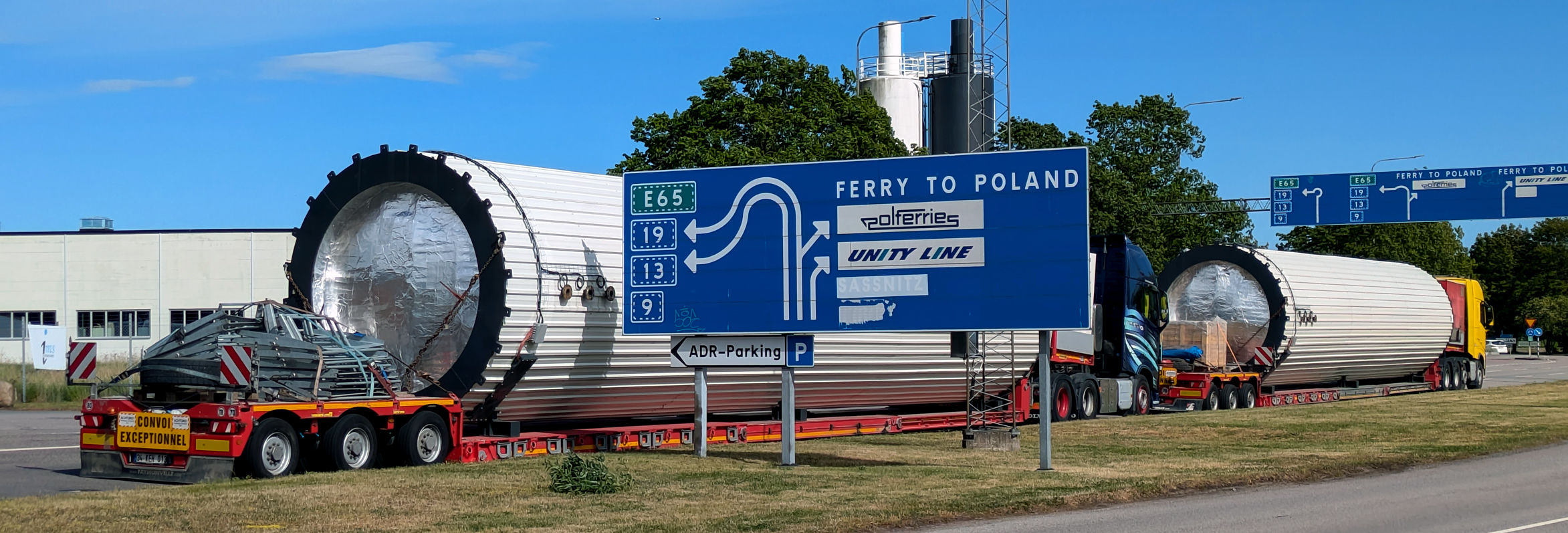
Two trucks with a very long load in the port of Ystad 2025.

Trucks must have special signs of "convoi exceptionnel" and lights that warn the oversized cargo. The escort car has also special signs, depending on the country within which it operates. Special permits are issued by local authorities to allow a transporter to operate on a public road for a limited period and for a certain and given route.

Heavy transport companies tend to focus on renewables, civil and infrastructure, offshore, oil and gas, heavy engineering and power generation industries. Other companies across Europe have also collaborated to form the Route To Space Alliance.

==== The Netherlands ====
Due to its strategic location, there are many Dutch-based special transport companies, but due to the relatively small size of the country, these companies, such as Van der Vlist have often started to spread further afield to increase their market and take advantage of the freedom of movement offered through the EU.

==== Romania ====
In Romania, if the total dimensions (truck+load) exceed 16.5 by 2.5 by 4 metres (54.1 ft × 8.2 ft × 13.1 ft) × 40 tonnes (39 long tons; 44 short tons) (or if it does not fit into a tilt truck), then a transport is considered out of gauge. A table of maximum dimensions and weight as well as best practices is available for European countries on the following industry resource site.

Romania has an active market for special transporters where, as mentioned above, companies such as Schnell Trans, deal with international transportation projects. Trailers suitable for special loads have different characteristics depending on the number of axles, height from the ground to the platform, extensions or load capacity. Each of these trucks can carry loads such as trams, energy transformers, construction machines, metallic structures or wooden boxes/crates.

==== United Kingdom ====
An abnormal load is defined as

- a load with a weight of more than 44 tonnes
- an axle load of more than 10 tonnes for a single non-driving axle and 11.5 tonnes for a single driving axle
- a width of more than 2.9 metres
- a rigid length of more than 18.65 metres

Anyone wishing to transport an abnormal load must notify the police, highway authorities and any on-route bridge and structure owners such as Network Rail. National Highways operates a system known as "Electronic Service Delivery for Abnormal Loads" (ESDAL) for the purpose of supporting notifications.

=== New Zealand ===
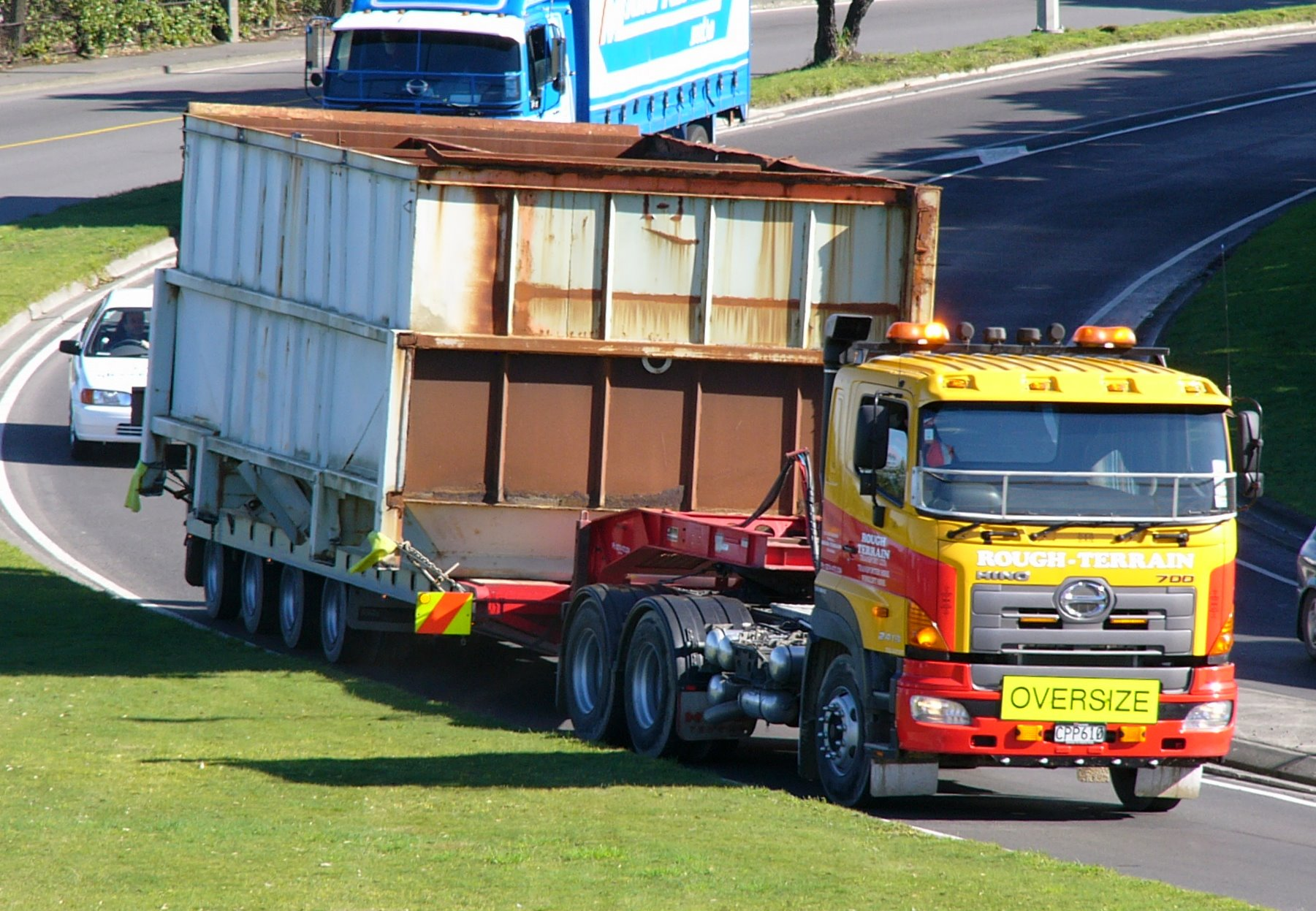
Oversize load in New Zealand

In New Zealand, an oversize load is a vehicle or load that is wider than 2.55 m (8 ft 4 in) or higher than 4.3 m (14 ft 1 in). Overlength limits vary depending on the type and the configuration of vehicle, but the overall maximum forward distance (i.e. the length from the front of the vehicle to the centre axis of the rear axle set) is 9.5 m (31 ft 2 in), the overall maximum single vehicle length is 12.6 m (41 ft 4 in) (some buses can be longer), and the overall maximum combination length is 22.0 m (72 ft 2 in). Loads must be indivisible, except when the vehicle is oversize itself where it can carry divisible loads as long as the divisible load fits within the standard load limits. Permits are not required for oversize vehicles which are under 25.0 m (82 ft 0 in) long, under 5.00 m (16 ft 5 in) high, and fit within a set combination of width and forward distance; but they must comply with certain rules regarding piloting, travel times and obstructions.

=== United States ===
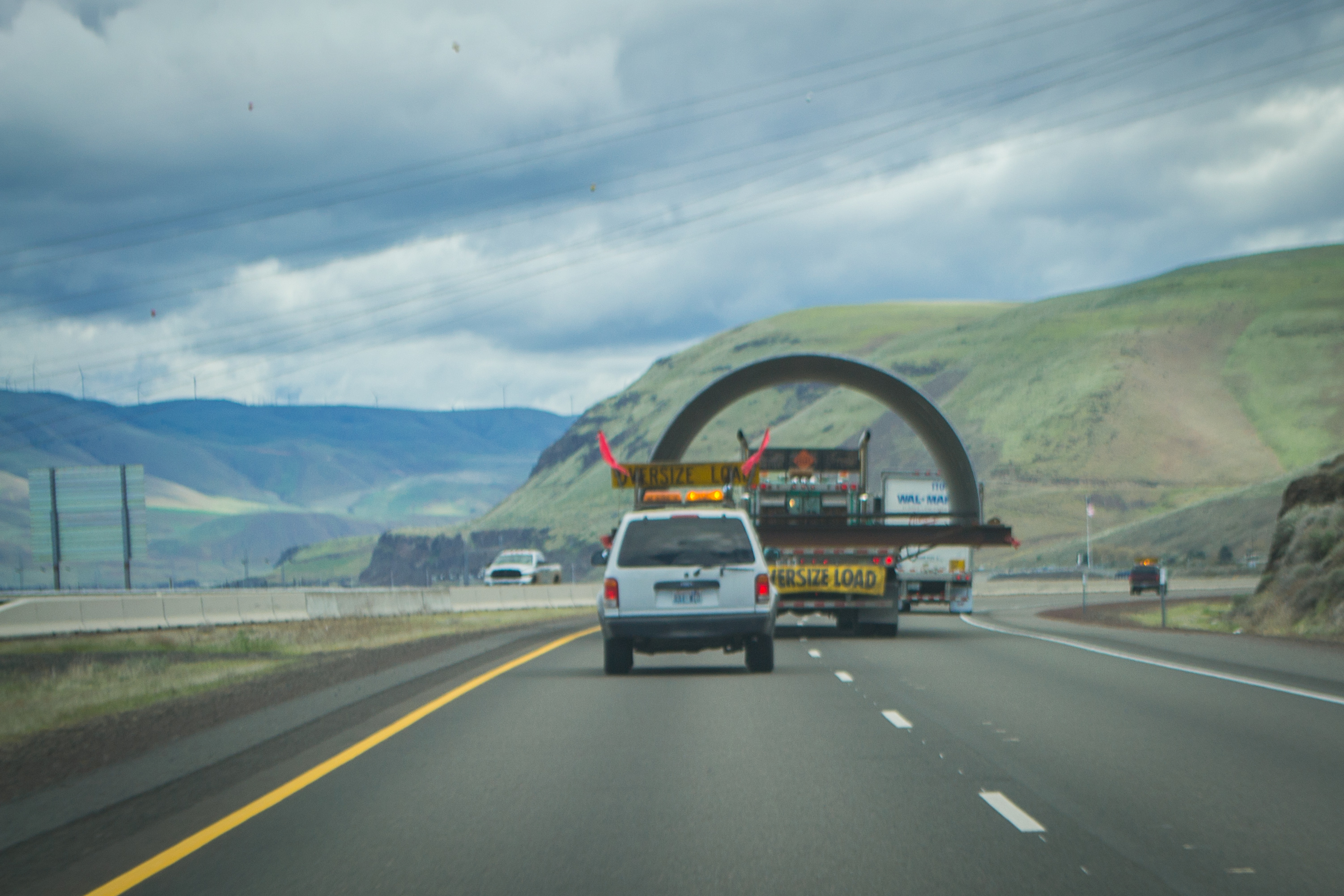
A rear view of an oversize load on Interstate 84 East near The Dalles, Oregon

In the United States, an oversize load is a vehicle or load that is wider than 2.59 m (8 ft 6 in). Each individual state has different requirements regarding height and length (most states are 4.11 m or 13 ft 6 in tall), and a driver must purchase a permit for each state they will be traveling through. In many states, a load must be considered "nondivisible" to qualify for a permit (i.e. an object which cannot be broken down into smaller pieces), although some states allow divisible loads to be granted permits.

=== India ===
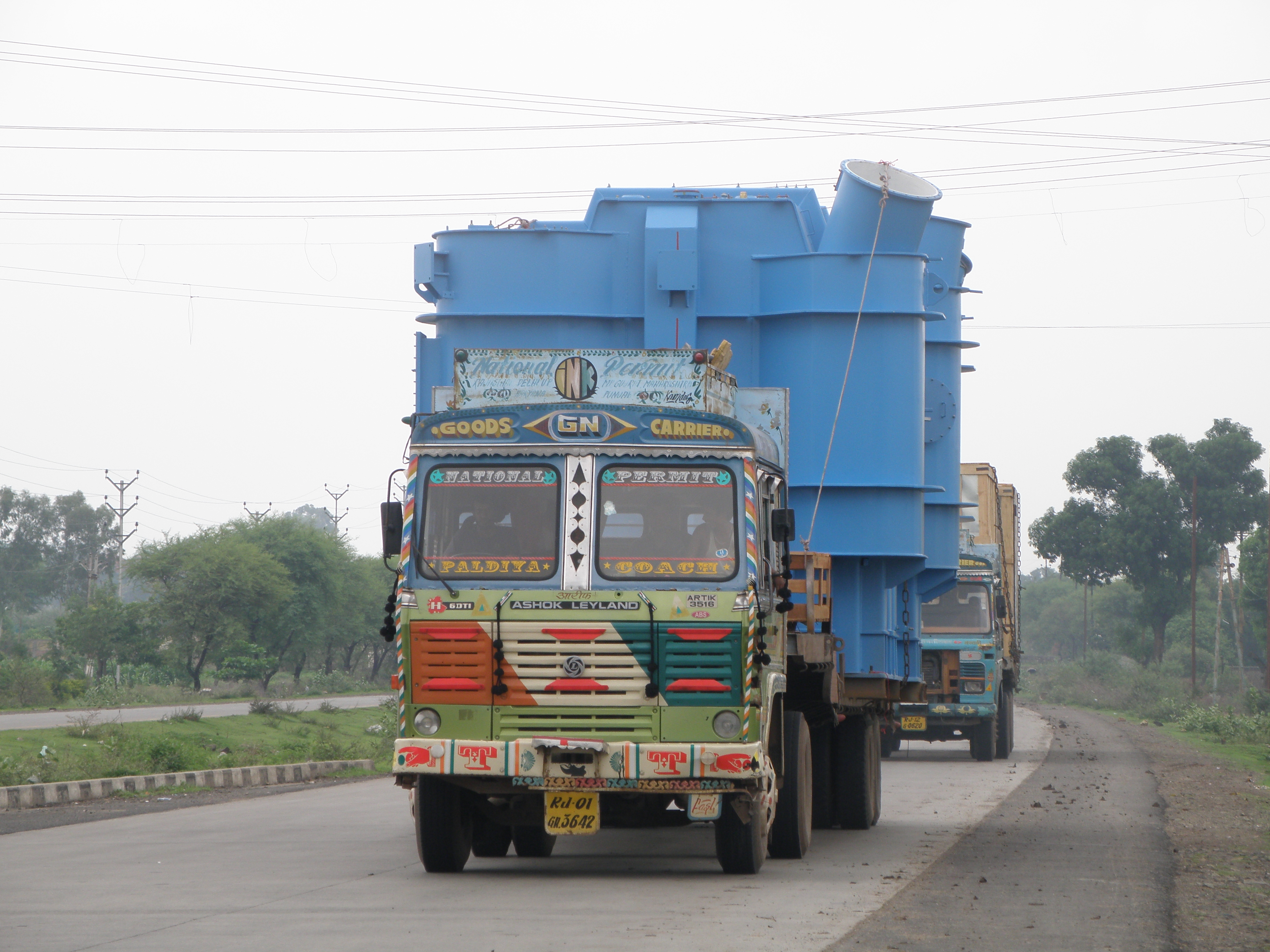
ODC load being carried on an Ashok Leyland tractor trailer combination in Indore, India

In India, any load which protrudes the platform of the vehicle which is defined in CMVR 1989 is considered ODC (Over Dimensional Cargo). Dimensions of a load with the height of 4 metres (13 ft) or width of 2.6 metres (8 ft 6 in) or length of 12 metres (39 ft) in case of rigid vehicle and 18 metres (59 ft) in case of tractor trailer combination needs to obtain state specific permissions, but no load can exceed the GVW of the vehicle.

Loads above 55 tons can only be moved on HMT (hydraulic modular trailer) and puller tractor combination, for which a nationalized permission must be obtained via MORTH (Ministry of Road Transport and Highways of India) portal with HMT payload of 18 ton per axle excluding the weight of the puller tractor. Loads not complying with rules are fined by the RTO (Regional Transport Office) officers individually, three for each dimension and one for weight.

== Signaling ==
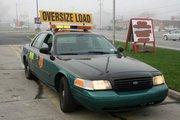
A Ford Crown Victoria in service as a pilot car/escort vehicle in the United States

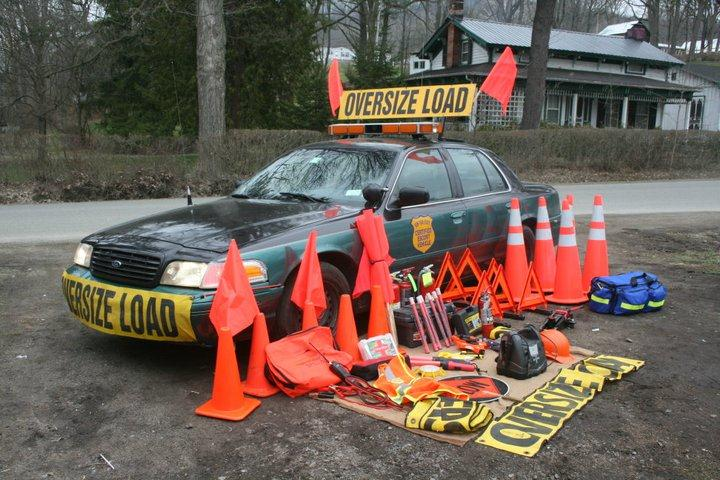
Pilot car/escort vehicle shown with required safety equipment

A pilot car driver may temporarily block traffic at intersections to ensure the safe passage of the truck.

== Hazards ==
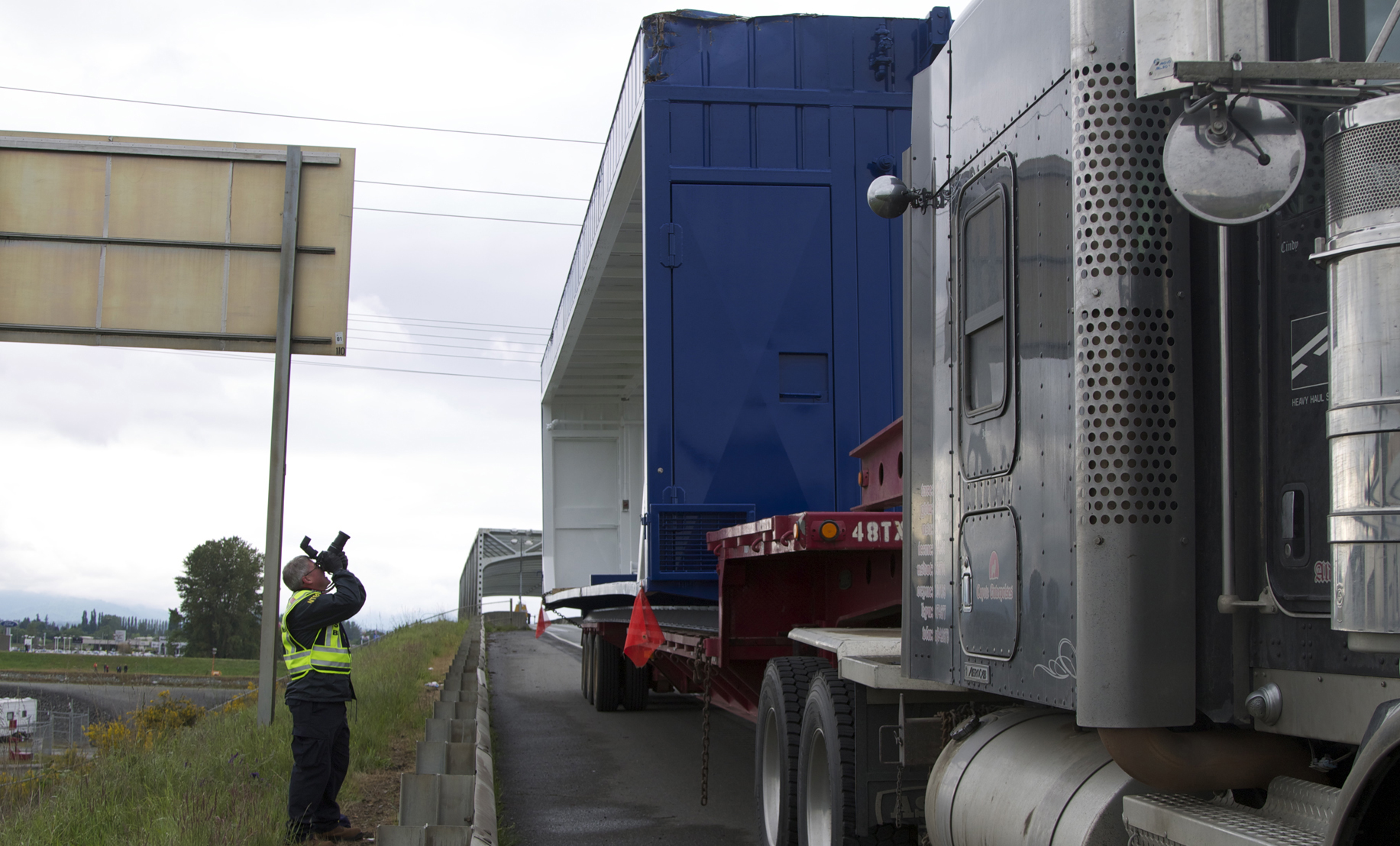
This oversize truck struck an overhead support and caused the I-5 Skagit River Bridge collapse.

Oversize loads present a hazard to roadway structures as well as to road traffic. Because they exceed design clearances, there is a risk that such vehicles can hit bridges and other overhead structures. Over-height vehicle impacts are a frequent cause of damage to bridges, and truss bridges are particularly vulnerable, due to having critical support members over the roadway. An over-height load struck the overhead beams on the I-5 Skagit River bridge in 2013, which caused the bridge to collapse.

== Licensing ==
Different countries have different approaches to licensing oversize or overweight loads. Licenses may be issued for a specific load, for a period of time, or to a specific company. In most jurisdictions, the permit specifies the exact route a vehicle must take, and includes clearance warnings. However, in some places, such as Washington state, drivers are responsible for choosing their own route. The carrier can choose to obtain the required permits themselves or go through a permit service.

== See also ==
- Loading gauge
- Structure gauge
- Trucking industry in the United States
- Maritime shipping Roll trailer
