= Permit service =

Trucking licensing service

A permit service is a company that specializes in obtaining transportation permits for the trucking industry, predominantly in the US and Canada. The two permits that may be required in lieu of IFTA Registration would be Trip and Fuel. A vehicle registered under IFTA does not need either permit as member jurisdictions work together to track, collect and share the taxes payable on motor fuels. A third permit is commonly required for oversize or overweight loads. There might also be specialty permits required for unusual circumstances. A permit service generally has an online portal which allows permits to be obtained within a few hours.

In government contracting, it is standard practice for the contractor to obtain all necessary licenses and permits without charging the government. Contractors are expected to follow all relevant federal, state, and local laws and building codes during the course of their work. They are also responsible for any damage to people or property caused by their own actions or negligence. Furthermore, contractors typically maintain responsibility for the materials and quality of work until the entire project is completed and officially accepted, unless specific sections have been separately reviewed and approved in advance.

== See also ==
- Glossary of the American trucking industry
- Road transport
