= Molenwaard =

- Former municipality
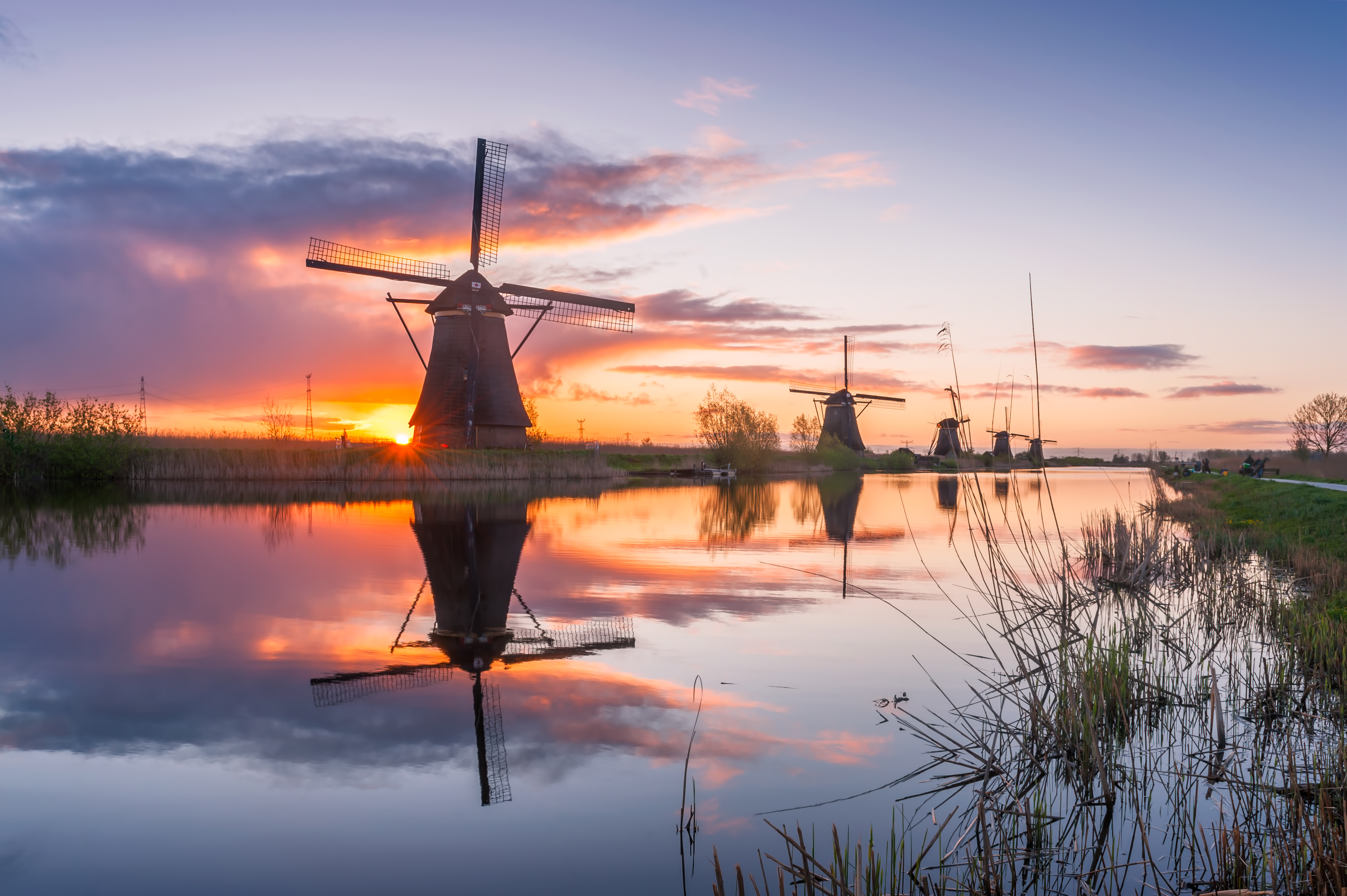
- A view of Kinderdijk at sunrise

- Flag Coat of arms

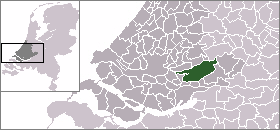
- Location in South Holland
- Coordinates: 51°52′N 4°47′E
- Country: Netherlands
- Province: South Holland
- Municipality: Molenlanden
- Established: 1 January 2013
- Merged: 1 January 2019

Area
  - Total: 126.47 km^{2} (48.83 sq mi)
  - Land: 118.29 km^{2} (45.67 sq mi)
  - Water: 8.18 km^{2} (3.16 sq mi)
- Elevation: −1 m (−3.3 ft)

Population (January 2021)
  - Total: data missing
- Time zone: UTC+1 (CET)
  - Summer (DST): UTC+2 (CEST)
- Postcode: 2957–2977
- Area code: 0184
- Website: www.gemeentemolenwaard.nl

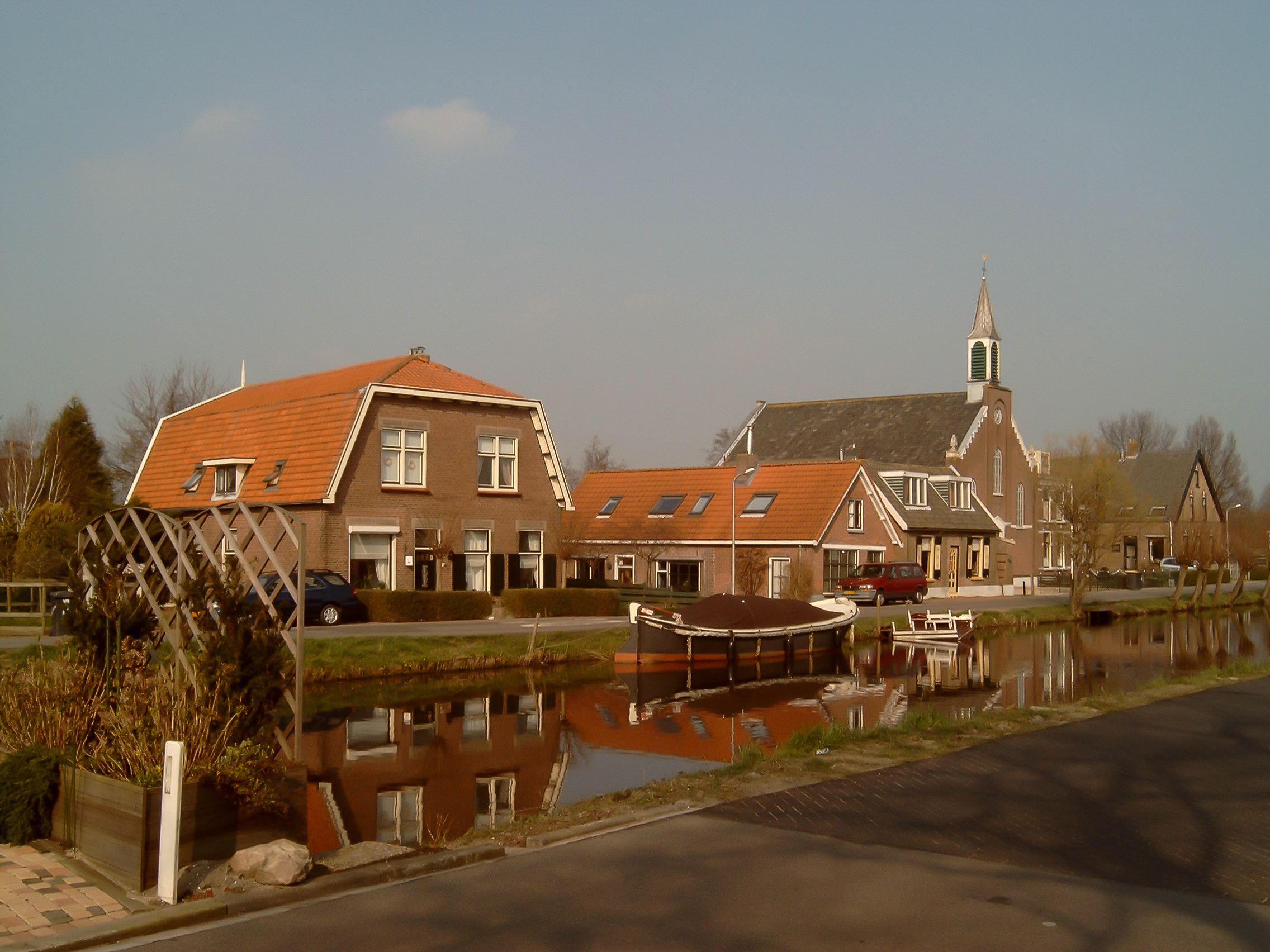
View of Brandwijk

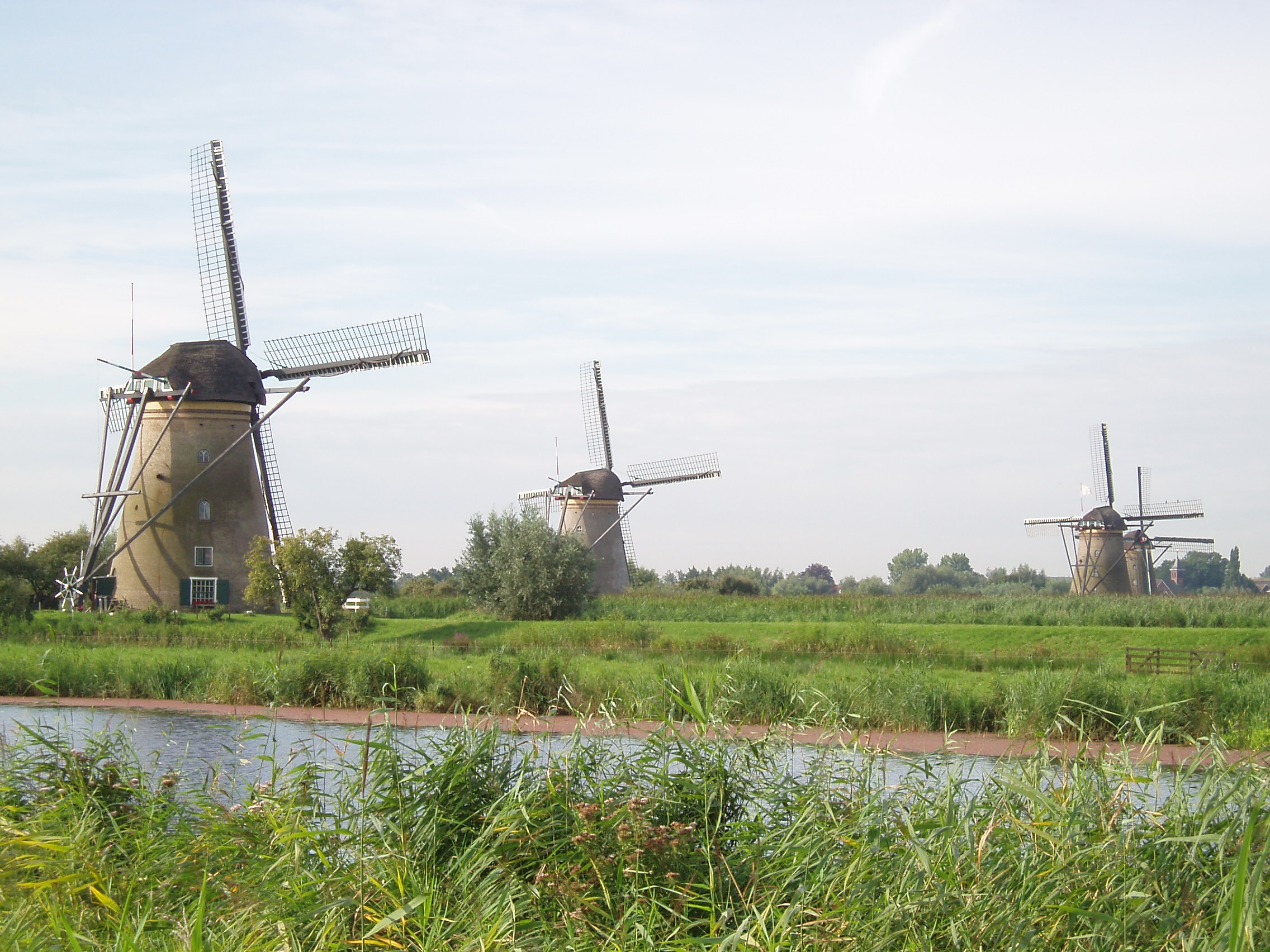
Windmills near Kinderdijk

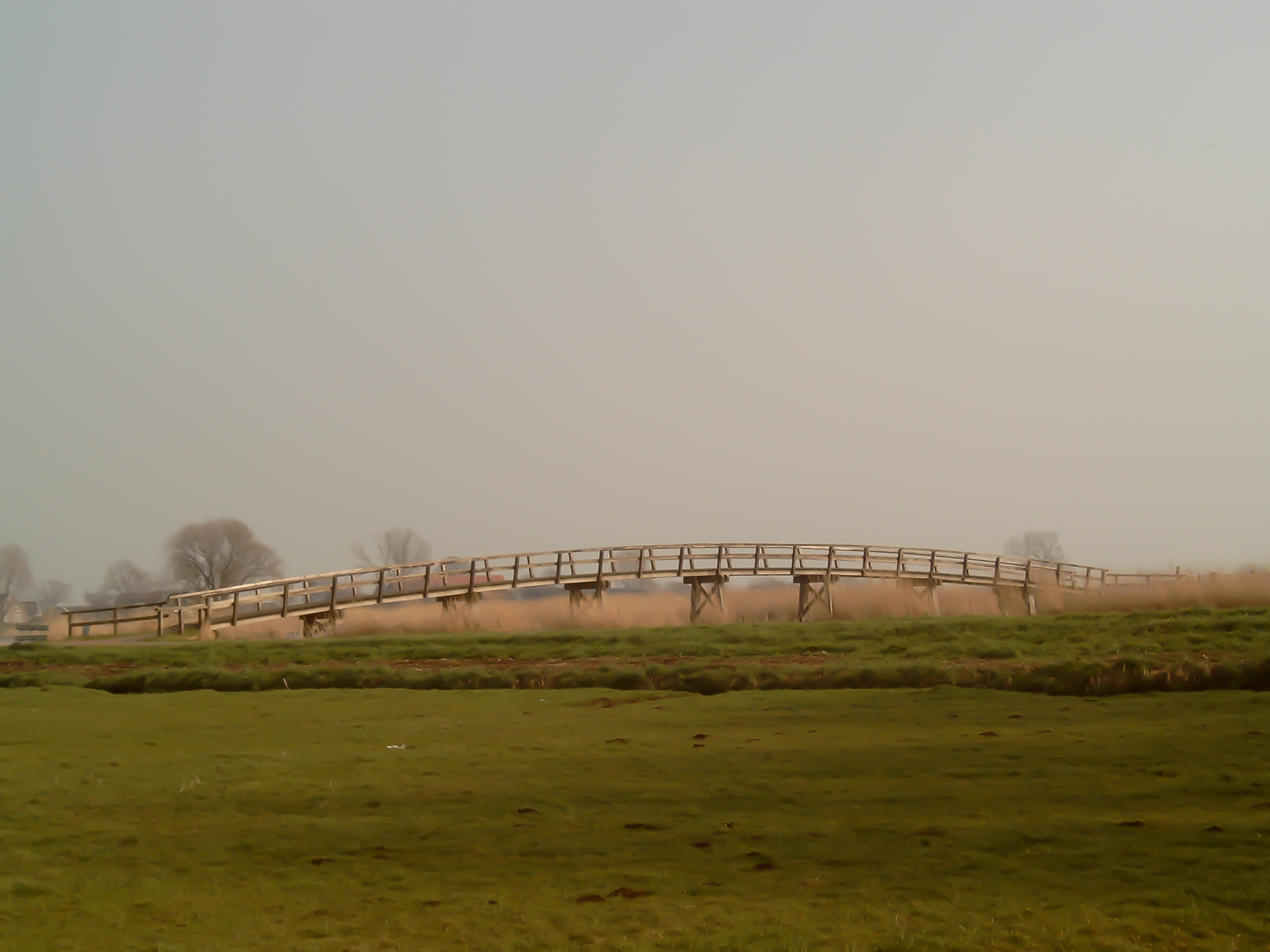
Polder and cycling-bridge near Streefkerk

Molenwaard (Note: Derived from molen ('mill') and waard ('flat riverland'). A large number of windmills are built in the territory.) (Dutch pronunciation: [ˈmoːlə(ɱ)ˌʋaːrt]) is a former municipality in the western Netherlands, in the southeastern part of the province of South Holland, and the northwestern part of the region of Alblasserwaard. It was the result of a merger of the municipalities of Graafstroom, Liesveld, and Nieuw-Lekkerland on 1 January 2013. On 1 January 2019 it merged with Giessenlanden, together they form the new municipality of Molenlanden. Molenwaard had about 29,000 inhabitants and an area of about 126 km^{2} (49 sq mi). The largest settlements are Bleskensgraaf, Groot-Ammers, and Nieuw-Lekkerland.

Molenwaard is a landscape of polders, consisting of large pastures traversed by ditches and canals, like the Groote- of Achterwaterschap, and the Ammersche Boezem. In the outermost northwest are the windmills of Kinderdijk. About 1.5 m below sea level, the municipality is bordered by the Lek river in the north and briefly the Noord river in the west. The Graafstroom and the Alblas flow through it.

Religiously, the municipality is part of the Bible Belt, resulting in the dominance of the Christian parties in politics.

== Localities ==
Molenwaard consists of the following settlements:

- Bleskensgraaf
- Brandwijk
- De Donk
- Gelkenes
- Gijbeland
- Goudriaan
- Graafland
- Groot-Ammers
- Hofwegen
- Kinderdijk
- Kooiwijk
- Langerak
- Liesveld
- Molenaarsgraaf
- Nieuw-Lekkerland
- Nieuwpoort
- Ottoland
- Oud-Alblas
- Streefkerk
- Vuilendam
- Waal
- Wijngaarden

== Topography ==
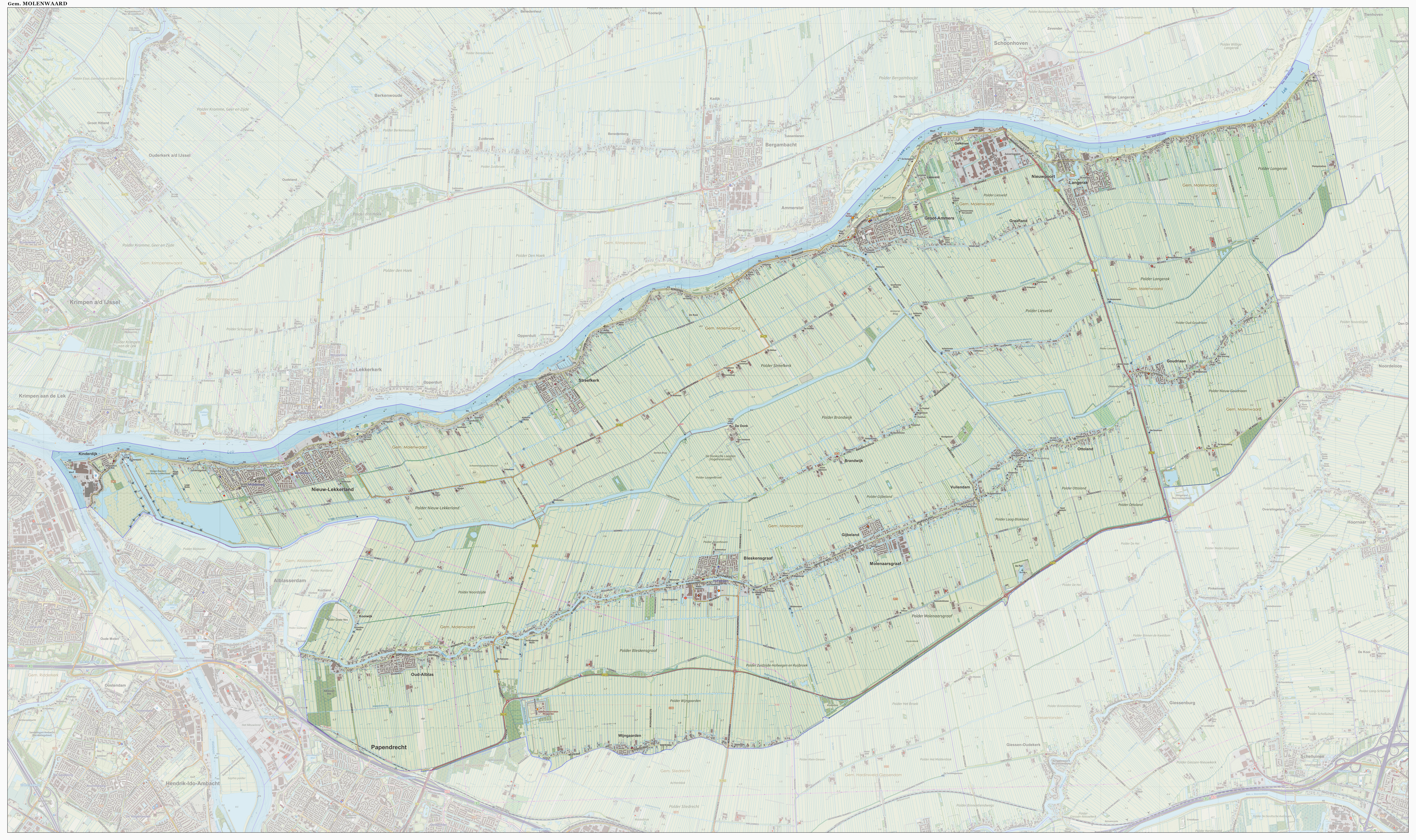
Map of the municipality of Molenwaard, June 2015

== Politics ==
Elections were held on 21 November 2012 for the first council of the new municipality of Molenwaard, which took office on 2 January 2013. The 21 seats divided as follows:

Municipal council seats
Party	2013
Reformed Political Party (SGP)	5
Christian Democratic Appeal (CDA)	5
ChristianUnion (CU)	4
Labour Party (PvdA)	3
Gemeentebelangen Molenwaard	2
People's Party for Freedom and Democracy (VVD)	2
Total	21

There was an election in November 2018 for the new merged Molenlanden municipality that commenced work on 1 January 2019, replacing Molenwaard council.

== Notable people ==
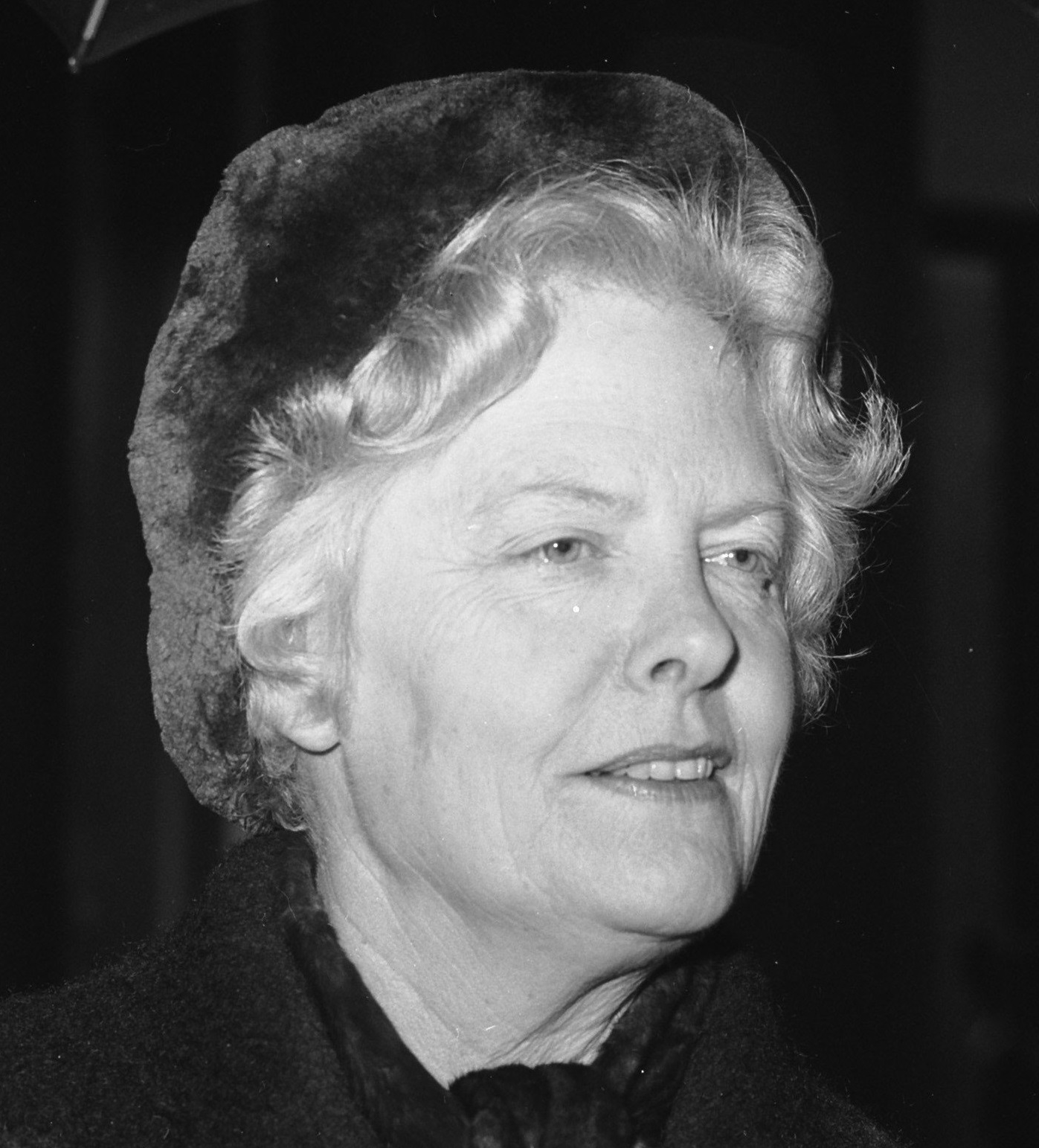
Els Veder-Smit, 1978

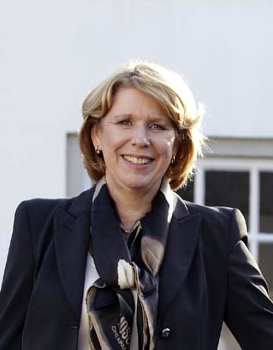
Corien Wortmann, 2011

- Johannes Gysius (ca. 1583 – 1652 in Streefkerk) a Dutch historian and minister
- Fop Smit (1777 in Alblasserdam – 1866) a Dutch naval architect, shipbuilder, and shipowner
- Aart den Boer (1852 in Nieuw-Lekkerland – 1941) a Dutch architect and contractor
- Simon Bon (1904 in Nieuwpoort – 1987) a Dutch rower, competed at the 1924 and 1928 Summer Olympics
- Herbertus Bikker (1915 in Wijngaarden – 2008) a Dutch war criminal and member of the Waffen-SS
- Els Veder-Smit (born 1921 in Kinderdijk – 2020) a Dutch politician
- Willem Aantjes (1923 in Bleskensgraaf – 2015) a Dutch politician and jurist
- Ad Dekkers (1938 in Nieuwpoort – 1974) a Dutch artist of reliefs
- Gert Schutte (born 1939 in Nieuwpoort – 2022) a Dutch politician and teacher
- Dirk van der Borg (born 1955 in Thesinge) a Dutch politician, Mayor of Molenwaard since 2013
- Corien Wortmann-Kool (born 1959 in Oud-Alblas) a Dutch politician and Member of the European Parliament
- Maarten Demmink (born in 1967 in Goudriaan) known as Demiak, is a Dutch painter, photographer and sculptor
- Merijn Korevaar (born 1994) and Jeanne Korevaar (born 1996 in Groot-Ammers) Dutch racing cyclists
