= Laagblokland =

Coordinates: 51.890716°N 4.846687°E

Laagblokland is a former hamlet in the Dutch province of South Holland. It was located in the former municipality of Graafstroom, between the villages of Molenaarsgraaf and Ottoland.

Laagblokland was a separate municipality between 1817 and 1857, when it merged with Ottoland.
