= Liesveld =

Liesveld may refer to:

- Liesveld (former municipality), a former municipality of South Holland, since 2013 part of the new municipality of Molenwaard
- Liesveld (hamlet), a hamlet in the municipality of Molenwaard
- Liesveld (polder), a polder and former water board in the municipality of Molenwaard
