= Graafstroom =

Graafstroom may refer to:

- Graafstroom (former municipality), a former municipality of South Holland, since 2013 part of the new municipality of Molenwaard
- Graafstroom (river), a canal which flows through the municipality of Molenwaard
