= Vuilendam =

- Hamlet
- Interactive map of Vuilendam
- Coordinates: 51.53°N 4.50°E
- Country: Netherlands
- Province: South Holland
- Municipality: Molenlanden
- Source: CBS, Statline.
- Time zone: UTC+1 (CET)
  - Summer (DST): UTC+2 (CEST)

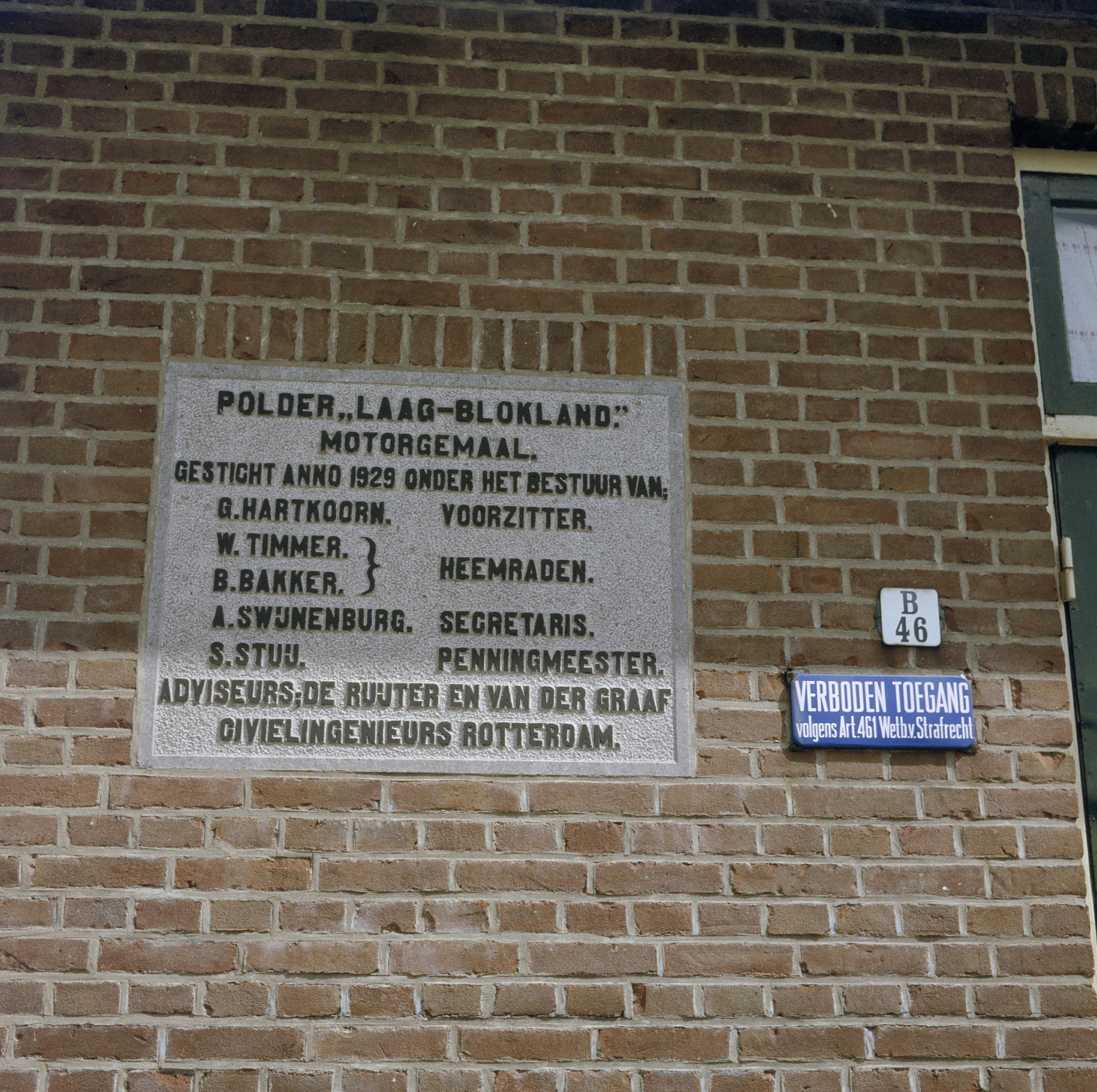
Memorial stone/ Pumping station: Memorial stone motor pumping station at Vuilendam in the Laag-Blokland polder

Vuilendam is a hamlet in Molenlanden, which is a municipality in the Dutch province of South Holland. Vuilendam lies between Molenaarsgraaf and Ottoland.
