= Demiak =

Dutch painter

Demiak (pseudonym of Maarten Demmink) is a Dutch painter, photographer and sculptor. Born in 1967 in Goudriaan, he lives and works in The Hague.

== Biography ==
He grew up in Laag-Soeren where he was initiated to painting by his mother and grandfather, both artists and teachers. He first studied at the Utrecht School of the Arts (1986-1988). Disappointed by the predominance of abstraction in the courses, he transferred to the Royal Academy of Art, The Hague, more focused on pictorial techniques. He was graduated in 1992 under the pseudonym Demiak.

Along with a group of friends met at the Royal Academy, including Vittorio Roerade, Niels Janssen, Peter Zwaan and Tjebbe Beekman, he settled in the area of Laakkwartier being demolished. Since that date, Demiak has been working temporarily in different damaged buildings: former offices, old schools or houses. The difficulty to find a permanent studio finds an echo in his sculptures and photographs of ruined houses.

He began to paint surrealist landscapes before organizing his works in series and experimenting with new mediums in the 2000s, such as staged photographs, mixed media and mural wood sculptures. Fascinated by Piero della Francesca and by Leonardo da Vinci’s landscapes, Demiak explores the relationship between nature and industry in fantasy pictures or post-apocalyptic landscapes.

He was awarded the Van Ommeren de Voogt prize in 2004, the Jacob Hartog prize in 2010, the silver medal with Bas Koopmans and Festina Lente Collective for the cover art of The Kyteman orchestra album in 2012 and the Groene prize at the zomerexpo in 2013 by the Gemeentemuseum Den Haag.

== Work ==
- "Dreamland" series (2002-2008), paintings and painted photographs based on recurrent dreams he had of flying above imaginary landscapes. The painter gradually extends this series with mural and independent sculptures of wooden rudimentary houses
- "The Big blow" series, (2010-2013) paintings and watercolors depicting ravages caused by hurricanes, floods and other natural disasters through centuries. Each artwork looks like a vintage photograph and is entitled with the place and the date of a catastrophe, from the St. Elizabeth's flood (1421) in the Netherlands to the Breezy point fire in 2012 (Hurricane Sandy)
- "Malaysia" (2009), paintings, painted photographs and sculptures linked to a journey in Malaysia further to an invitation by the Malaysian Embassy
- "The Deepwater Horizon" series (2010-2011), docufiction staged photographs using small scales models related to the Gulf of Mexico oil spill in 2010
- "The Swampland series", paintings of virgin swamplands or swampy landscapes revealing marks of human activity inspired by journeys in Louisiana and Texas

== Solo exhibitions (selection) ==
- 2008: Dreamland, Pulchri Studio, The Hague
- 2012: Deepwater Horizon, Galerie Kap Pur, Tilburg; The Big Blow, Redbud Gallery, Houston
- 2022: Places & Traces, Galerie Jean-Marie Oger, Paris

== Group exhibitions (selection) ==
- 2009: Brushwork Odyssey in Malaysia, Pulchri Studio, The Hague
- 2011: Dutch Invasion, Williams Tower Gallery, Houston; Dutch Invasion, Box 13 Art Space, Houston
- 2013: Trouble the Water, Legion Arts, Cedar Rapids
- 2015: Sanctuary, Suzanne Biederberg Gallery, Amsterdam
- 2016: Still life – Style of life, Jean-Marie Oger, Paris

== Album cover art ==
- Kyteman, The Kyteman orchestra, 2012

== Bibliography ==
- Demiak –Dreamland, text by Paola van de Velde, Haags Palet deel 22, The Hague, 2008
- Brushwork Odyssey in Malaysia: A Dutch Retelling, Edition of the Embassy of Malaysia, The Hague, 2009
- Dutch Invasion - 5 Dutch artists visiting Houston, texts by Jetteke Bolten-Rempt and Maria Smits, 2011
- Beeld voor Beeld: HBKK jubileum boek, De Stichting Haagse Beeldende Kunst en Kunstnijverheid, 2014
