= Graafland, South Holland =

Graafland
- Hamlet
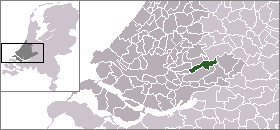

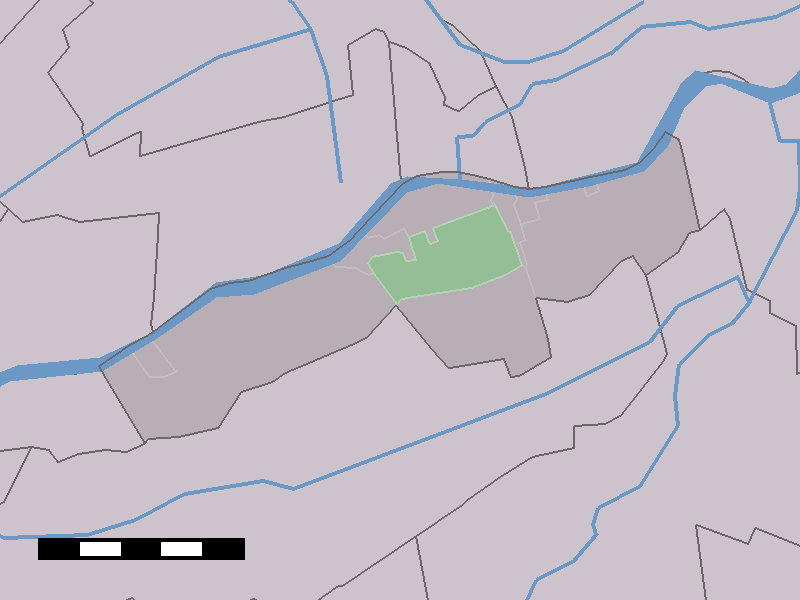
- The village (dark green) and the statistical district (light green) of Graafland in the former municipality of Liesveld.
- Coordinates: 51°55′30″N 4°51′23″E
- Country: Netherlands
- Province: South Holland
- Municipality: Molenlanden

Population (1 January 2005)
  - Total: 280
- Time zone: UTC+1 (CET)
  - Summer (DST): UTC+2 (CEST)

Graafland is a hamlet in the Dutch province of South Holland. It is a part of the municipality of Molenlanden, and lies about 13 km northwest of Gorinchem.

The statistical area "Graafland", which also can include the surrounding countryside, has a population of around 280.
