= Giessen-Oudekerk =

- Town
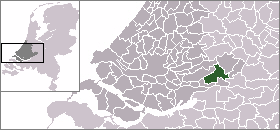

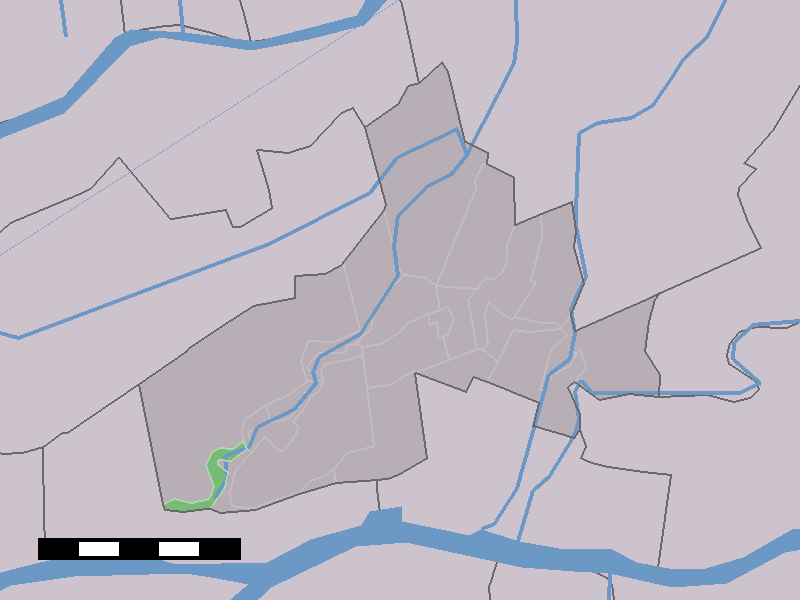
- Giessen-Oudekerk in the municipality of Giessenlanden.
- Coordinates: 51°50′37″N 4°51′57″E
- Country: Netherlands
- Province: South Holland
- Municipality: Molenlanden

Population (1 January 2005)
  - Total: 890
- Time zone: UTC+1 (CET)
  - Summer (DST): UTC+2 (CEST)

Giessen-Oudekerk (Dutch pronunciation: [ˌɣisənˈʌudəkɛr(ə)k, -səˈʔʌu-]) is a town in the Dutch province of South Holland. It is a part of the municipality of Molenlanden, and lies about 8 km west of Gorinchem.

The statistical area "Giessen-Oudekerk", which also can include the surrounding countryside, has a population of around 890.

== See also ==
- Lord of Giesenoudkerck: See House of van de Werve.
