= Gijbeland =

- Village
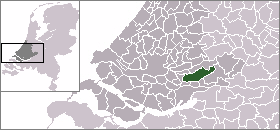

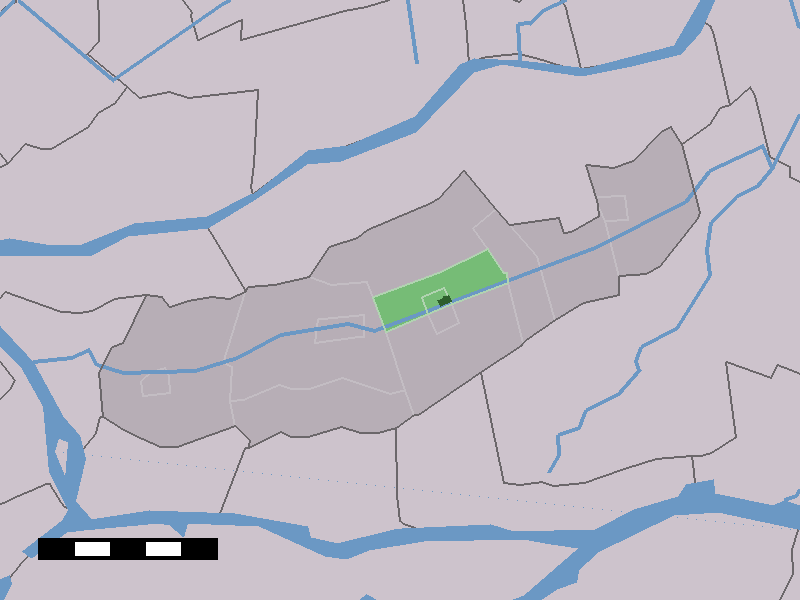
- The town centre (dark green) and the statistical district (light green) of Gijbeland in the former municipality of Graafstroom.
- Coordinates: 51°53′N 4°49′E
- Country: Netherlands
- Province: South Holland
- Municipality: Molenlanden

Population
  - Total: 850
- Time zone: UTC+1 (CET)
  - Summer (DST): UTC+2 (CEST)

Gijbeland is a village in the Dutch province of South Holland. It is a part of the municipality of Molenlanden.

In 2001, the village of Gijbeland had 435 inhabitants. The built-up area of the town was 0.068 km^{2}, and contained 183 residences. The statistical area "Gijbeland", which also can include the peripheral parts of the village, as well as the surrounding countryside, has a population of around 930.
