= Liesveld (hamlet) =

- Hamlet
- Interactive map of Liesveld
- Coordinates: 51.55°N 4.49°E
- Country: Netherlands
- Province: South Holland
- Municipality: Molenlanden
- Source: CBS, Statline.
- Time zone: UTC+1 (CET)
  - Summer (DST): UTC+2 (CEST)

Liesveld is a hamlet in Molenlanden, which is a municipality in the Dutch province of South Holland. Liesveld is on the southside of the Lek River, between Groot Ammers and Gelkenes.
