= Kooiwijk =

- Hamlet
- Interactive map of Kooiwijk
- Coordinates: 51.51°N 4.41°E
- Country: Netherlands
- Province: South Holland
- Municipality: Molenlanden
- Source: CBS, Statline.
- Time zone: UTC+1 (CET)
  - Summer (DST): UTC+2 (CEST)

Kooiwijk is a hamlet in Molenlanden, which is a municipality in the Dutch province of South Holland. Kooiwijk is 1 km north of the village of Oud-Alblas
