= De Donk =

De Donk Braankse Donk, Den Donk
- Hamlet
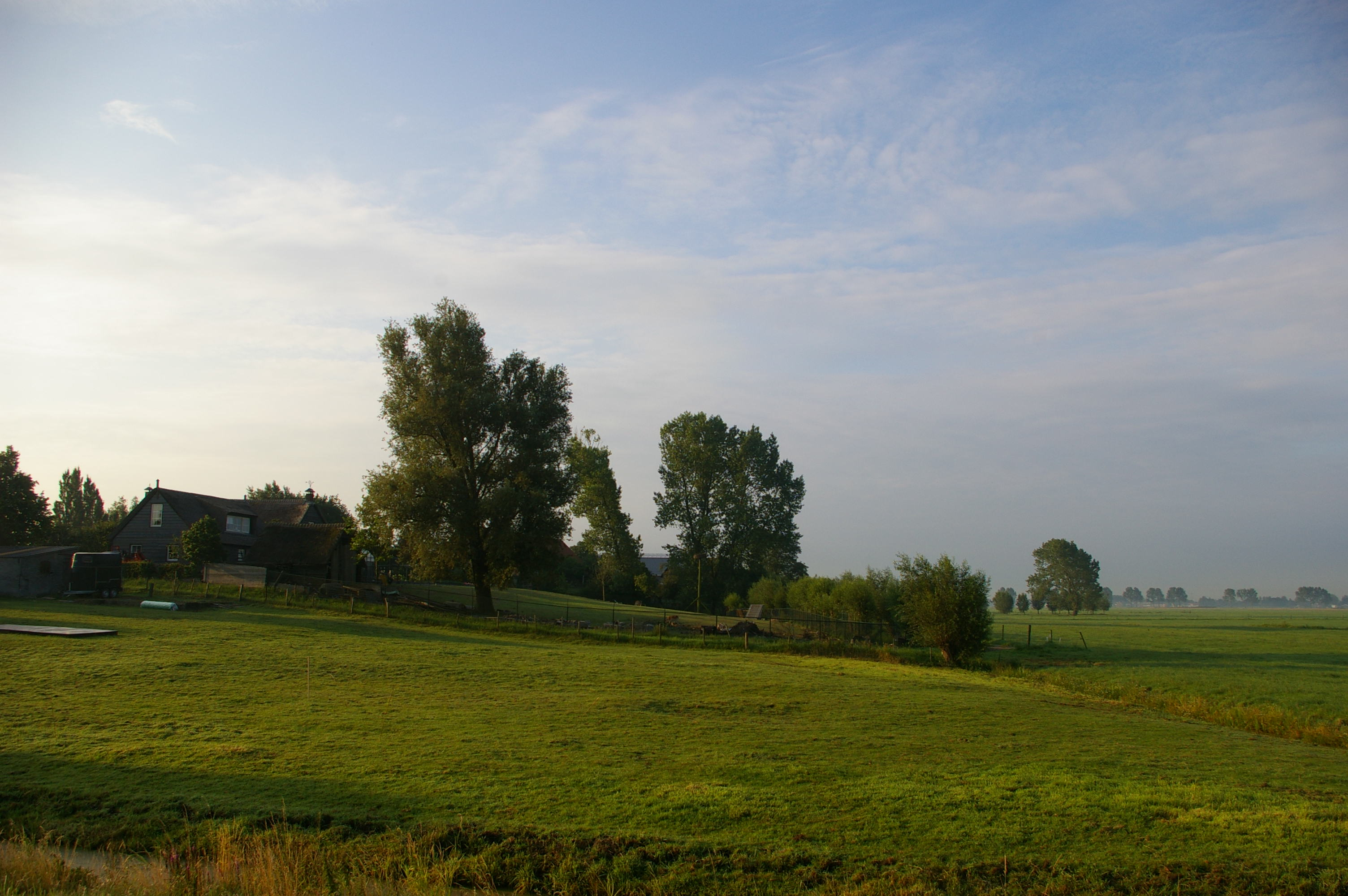
- View of De Donk
- Interactive map of De Donk
- Coordinates: 51.53°N 4.47°E
- Country: Netherlands
- Province: South Holland
- Municipality: Molenlanden
- Source: CBS, Statline.
- Time zone: UTC+1 (CET)
  - Summer (DST): UTC+2 (CEST)

De Donk (other names: Braankse Donk, and Den Donk) is a hamlet in Molenlanden, which is a municipality in the Dutch province of South Holland. De Donk is 2 km northwestern of the village of Brandwijk and consists of some farms on a five-meter-high sandhill.
