= Hofwegen =

Coordinates: 51°52′N 4°47′E

Molen - Hofwegen

Hofwegen is a hamlet in Molenlanden, which is a municipality in the Dutch province of South Holland. It is located on the south bank of the small river Graafstroom. It is now considered to be part of the village of Bleskensgraaf, which lies on the opposite bank.

Hofwegen was a separate municipality between 1817 and 1855, when it became part of the municipality of Bleskensgraaf en Hofwegen. In 1986, Bleskensgraaf en Hofwegen became part of the municipality of Graafstroom. Last one has become part of the new municipality of Molenwaard in 2013.
