= Wijngaarden =

- Village
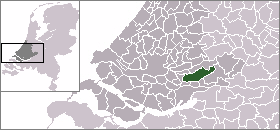

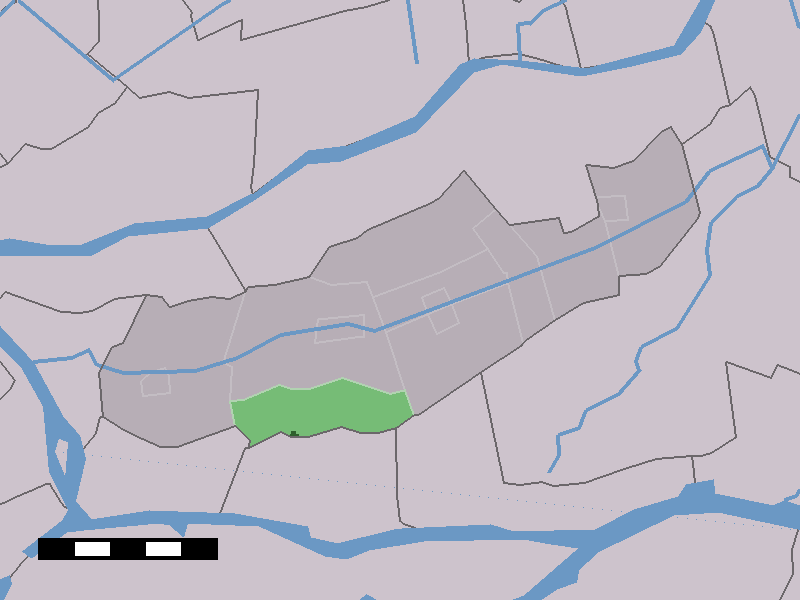
- The village centre (dark green) and the statistical district (light green) of Wijngaarden in the former municipality of Graafstroom.
- Coordinates: 51°50′40″N 4°45′40″E
- Country: Netherlands
- Province: South Holland
- Municipality: Molenlanden

Area
  - Total: 6.38 km^{2} (2.46 sq mi)

Population (1 January 2008)
  - Total: 697
  - Density: 109/km^{2} (283/sq mi)
- Time zone: UTC+1 (CET)
  - Summer (DST): UTC+2 (CEST)

Wijngaarden is a village in the Dutch province of South Holland. It is a part of the municipality of Molenlanden, and lies about 7 km northeast of Dordrecht.

In 2001, the village of Wijngaarden had 300 inhabitants. The built-up area of the village was 0.030 km^{2}, and contained 99 residences. The statistical area "Wijngaarden", which also can include the peripheral parts of the village, as well as the surrounding countryside, has a population of around 730.

Wijngaarden was a separate municipality between 1817 and 1986, when it became part of Graafstroom, which in turn became part of Molenwaard in 2013.

== Economy ==
Wijngaarden's economy has seen substantial growth in the public sector during 2009, 2010 and 2011.
