= Kinderdijk =

Village in South Holland, Netherlands

- Village
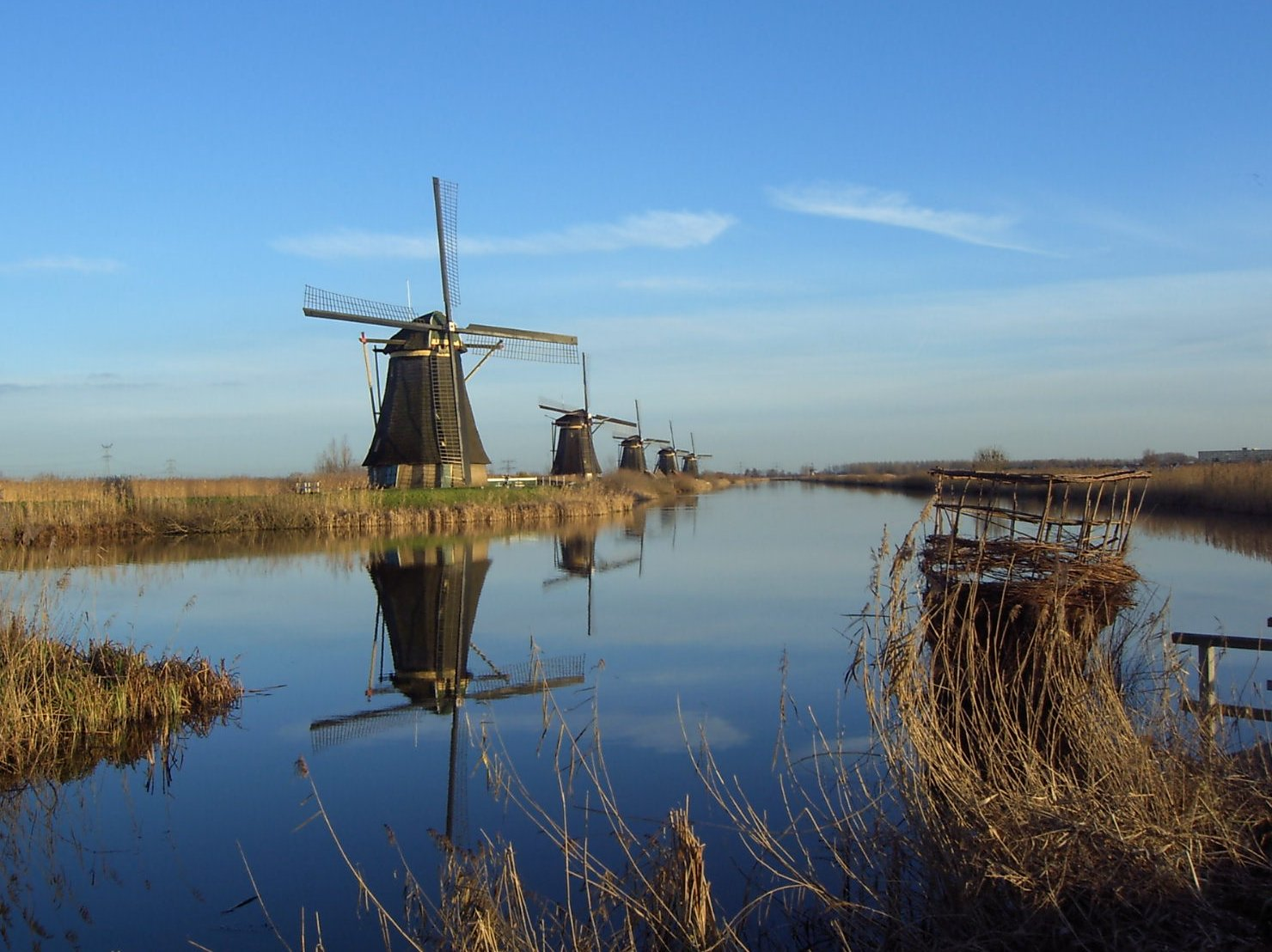
- Windmills at Kinderdijk
- Interactive map of Kinderdijk
- Coordinates: 51.8861°N 4.6310°E
- Country: Netherlands
- Province: South Holland
- Municipality: Molenlanden

Population (1 January 2021)
  - Total: 800

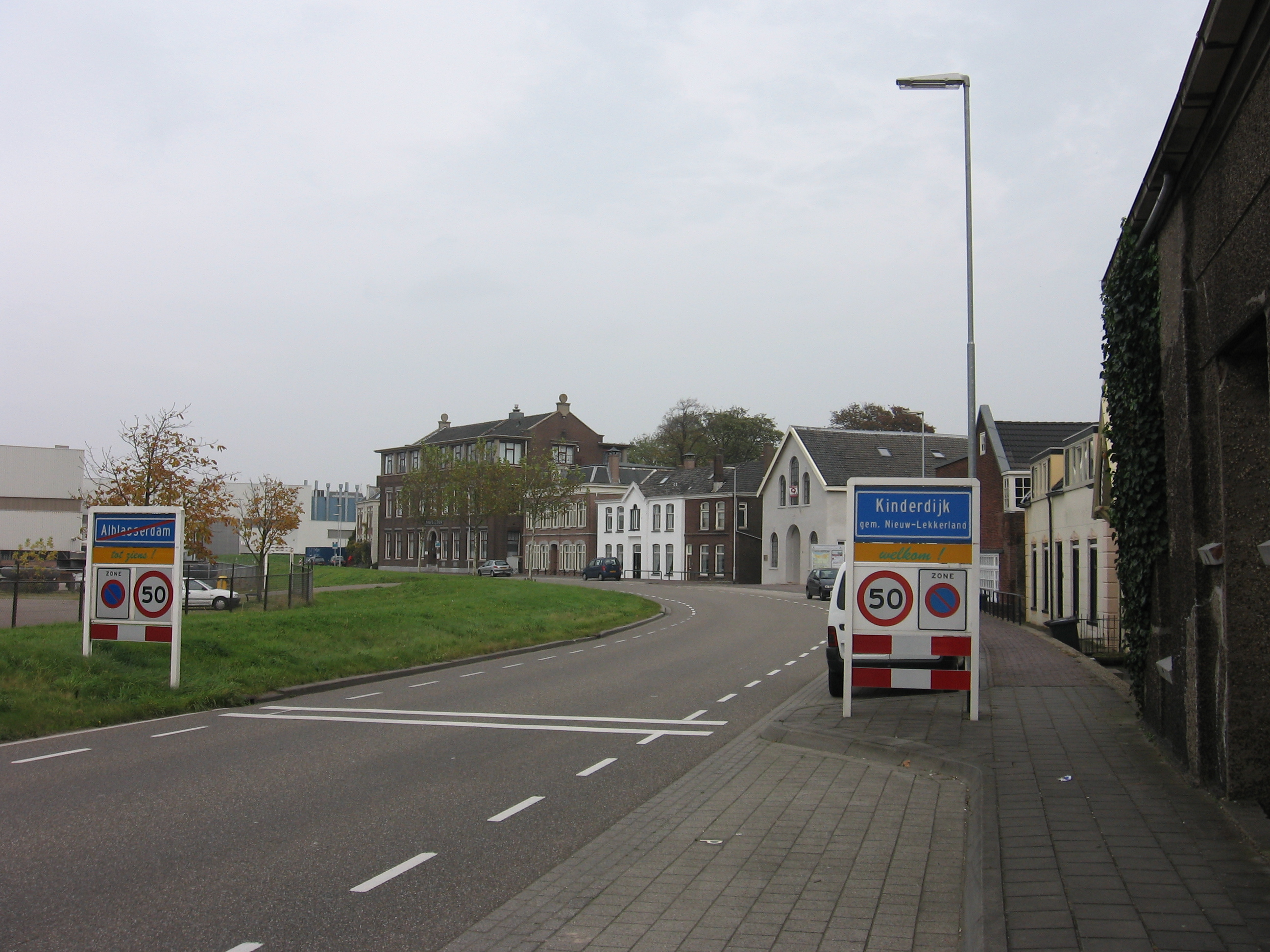
Kinderdijk

Kinderdijk (Dutch pronunciation: [ˌkɪndərˈdɛik]) is a town in the municipality of Molenlanden, in the province of South Holland, Netherlands. It is located about 15 km (9 miles) east of Rotterdam.

Kinderdijk is situated in the Alblasserwaard polder at the confluence of the Lek and Noord rivers. To drain the polder, a system of 19 windmills was built around 1740. This group of mills is the largest concentration of old windmills in the Netherlands. The windmills of Kinderdijk are one of the best-known Dutch tourist sites. They have been a UNESCO World Heritage Site since 1997.

== Etymology ==
The name Kinderdijk is Dutch for "Children dike". During the Saint Elizabeth flood of 1421, the Grote Hollandse Waard flooded, but the Alblasserwaard polder stayed unflooded. It is often said that when the horrendous storm had subsided, a villager went to the dike between these two areas to inspect what could be salvaged. In the distance he saw a wooden cradle floating on the water. As it came nearer, some movement was noted, and upon closer investigation, a cat was found, trying to keep it in balance by leaping back and forth in such a manner that water couldn't flood the cradle. As the cradle eventually came close enough to the dike for a bystander to pick up the cradle, he saw that a baby was quietly sleeping inside it, nice and dry. The cat had kept the cradle balanced and afloat. This folktale and legend has been published as "The Cat and the Cradle" in English.

== History ==
=== Origins ===
Kinderdijk first originated its name in 1421 from a legend where a wave was said to have washed ashore a cradle that contained a sleeping baby.

=== Early years ===
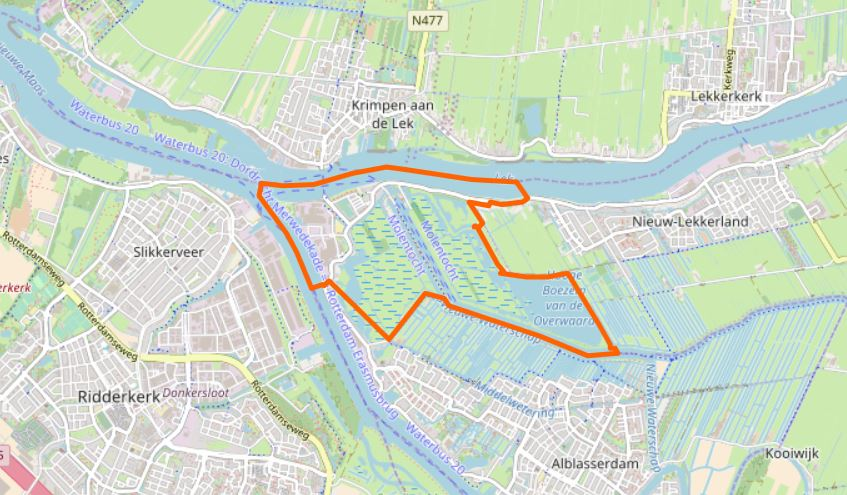
Boundaries of the village of Kinderdijk

In the Alblasserwaard, problems with water became more and more apparent in the 13th century. Large canals, called weteringen in Dutch, were dug to get rid of the excess water in the polders. However, the drained soil continued to subside, while the level of the river rose due to the river's sand deposits. After a few centuries, an additional way to keep the polders dry was required.

=== Construction ===
It was decided to build a series of windmills, with a limited capacity to bridge water level differences, but just able to pump water into a reservoir at an intermediate level between the soil in the polder and the river.

The reservoir could be pumped out into the river by other windmills whenever the river level was low enough; the river level has both seasonal and tidal variations. Although some of the windmills are still used, the main water works are provided by two diesel pumping stations near one of the entrances of the windmills site.

=== World Heritage Site ===
Kinderdijk was inscribed as a UNESCO World Heritage Site in 1997. The village is a fascinating rural landscape with a total of 19 monument 18th-century windmills.

== In popular culture ==
- In the 2005 PlayStation 2 video game Sly 3: Honor Among Thieves, Kinderdijk is the third playable location. Several missions include utilizing the iconic windmills to aid the main character, Sly, in a biplane dogfight over the village.
- Kinderdijk is a stage in the fighting game Capcom vs. SNK 2: Mark of the Millennium 2001. The players fight in front of the windmills in a verdant field.

== Image gallery ==
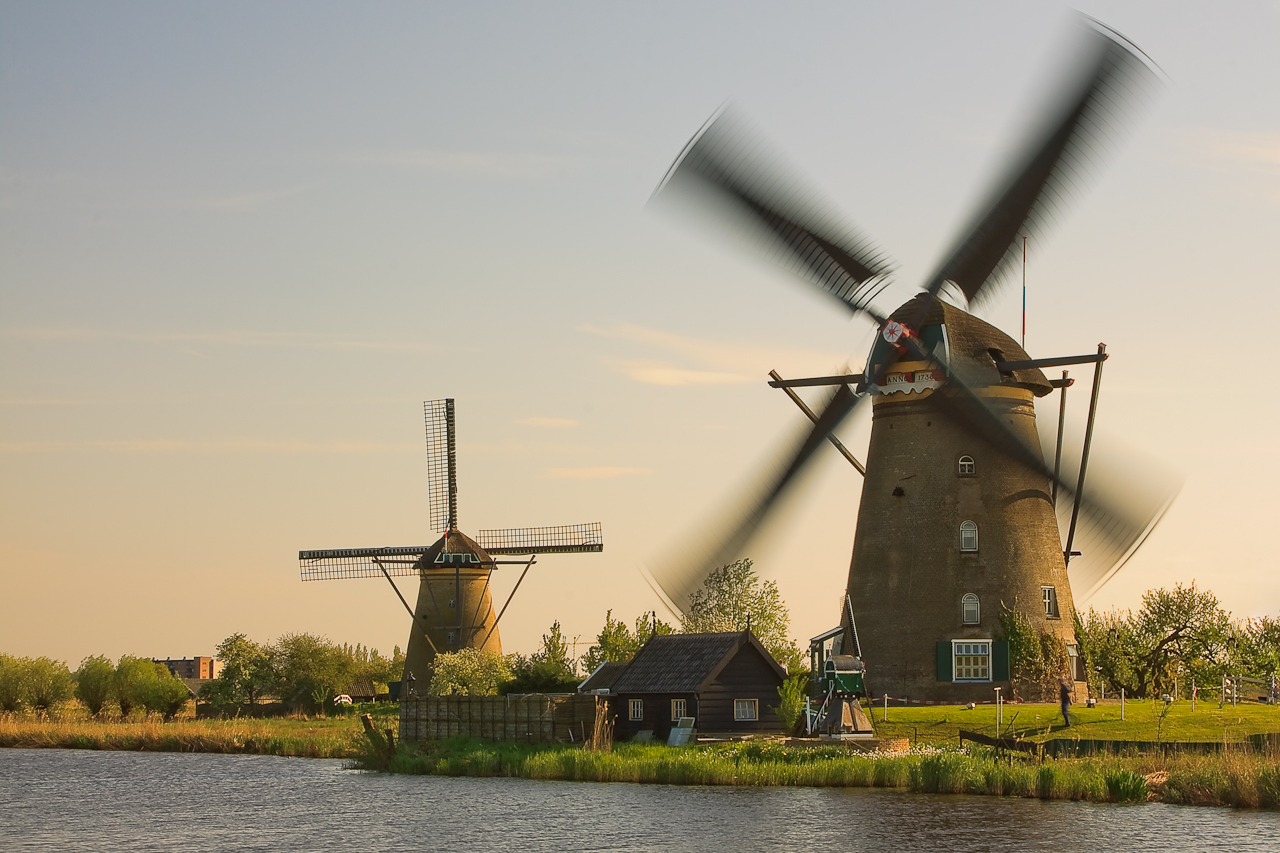
Active windmill

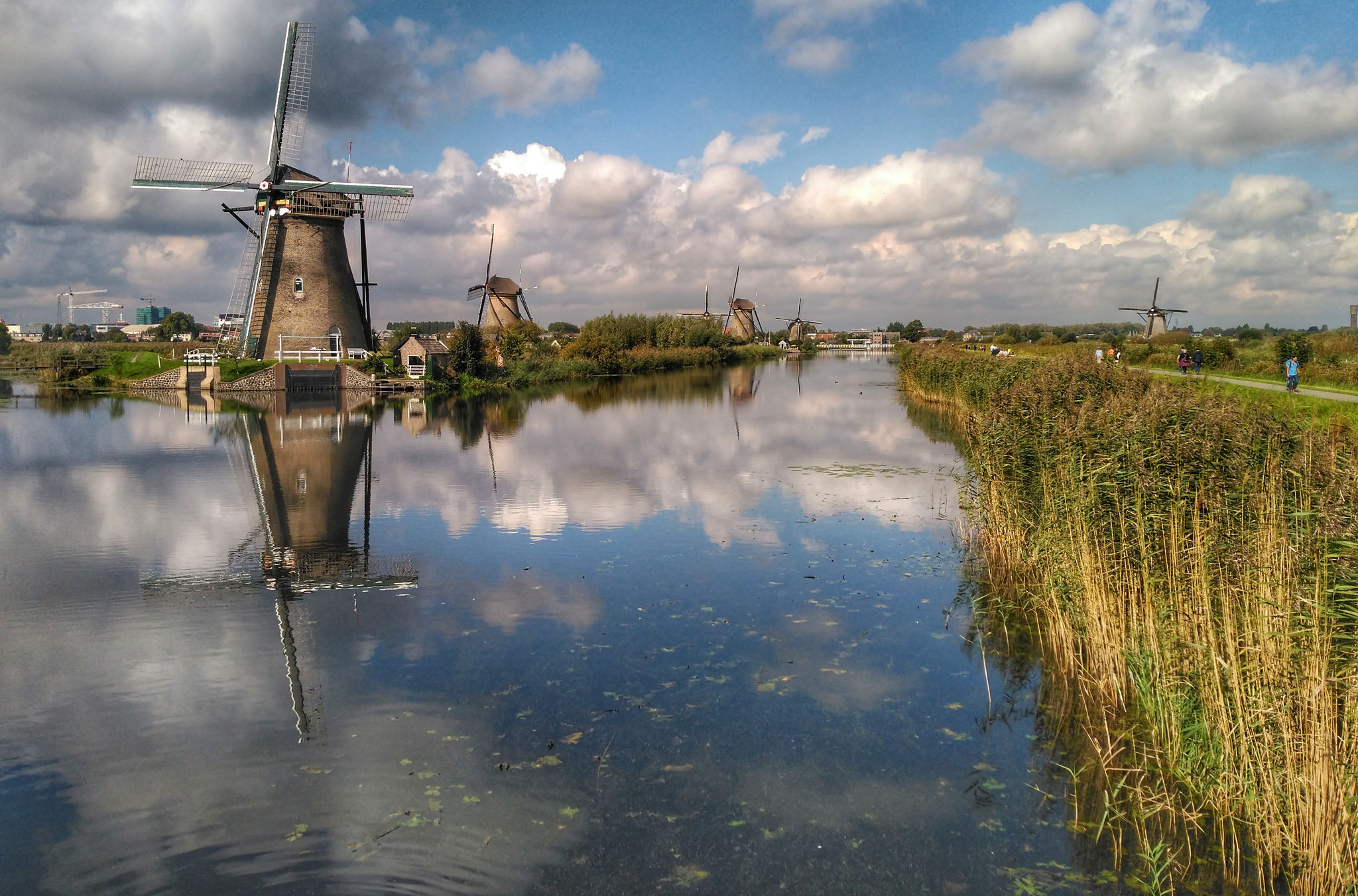
Kinderdijk windmills mirrored at the channel

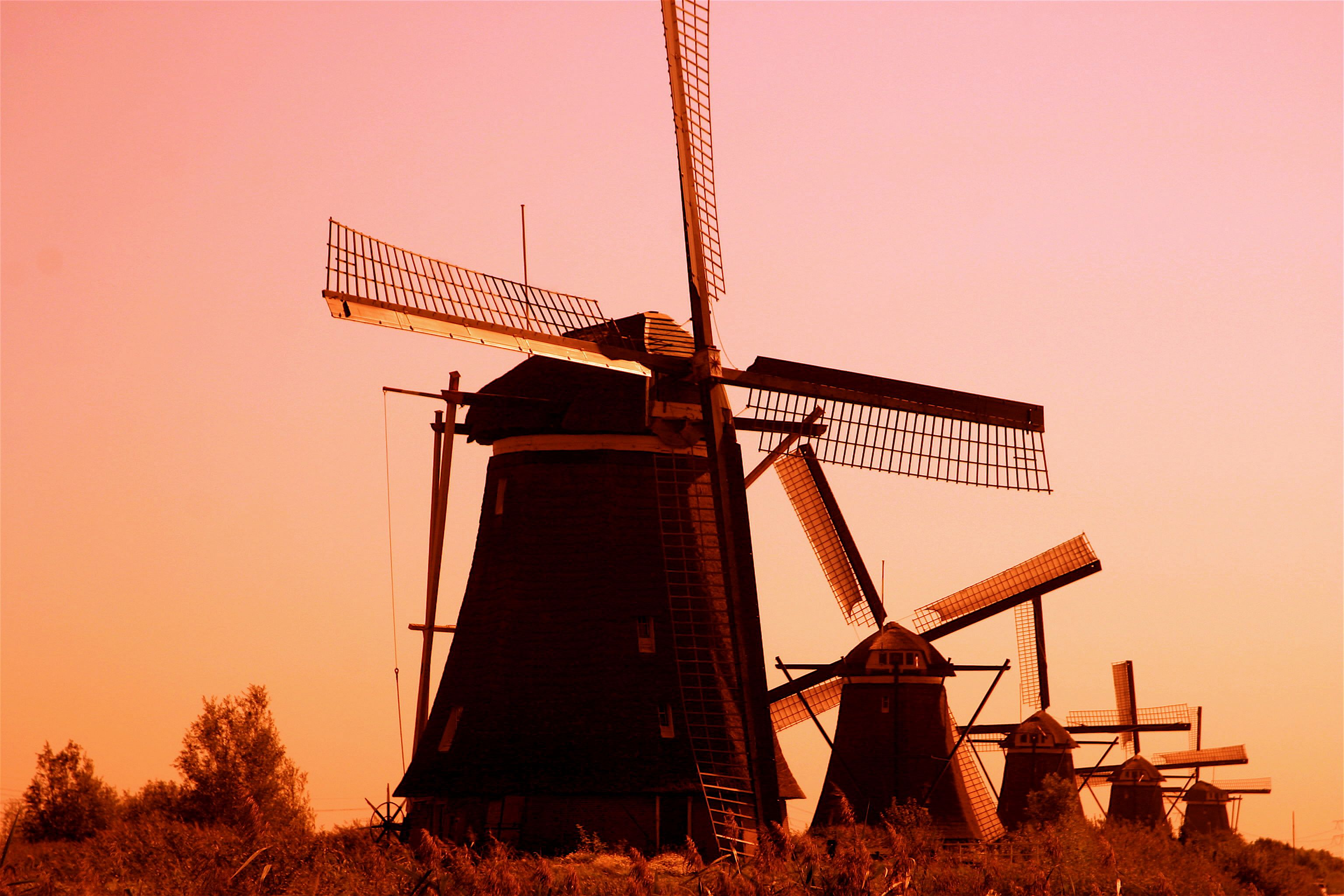
Sunset on Kinderdijk

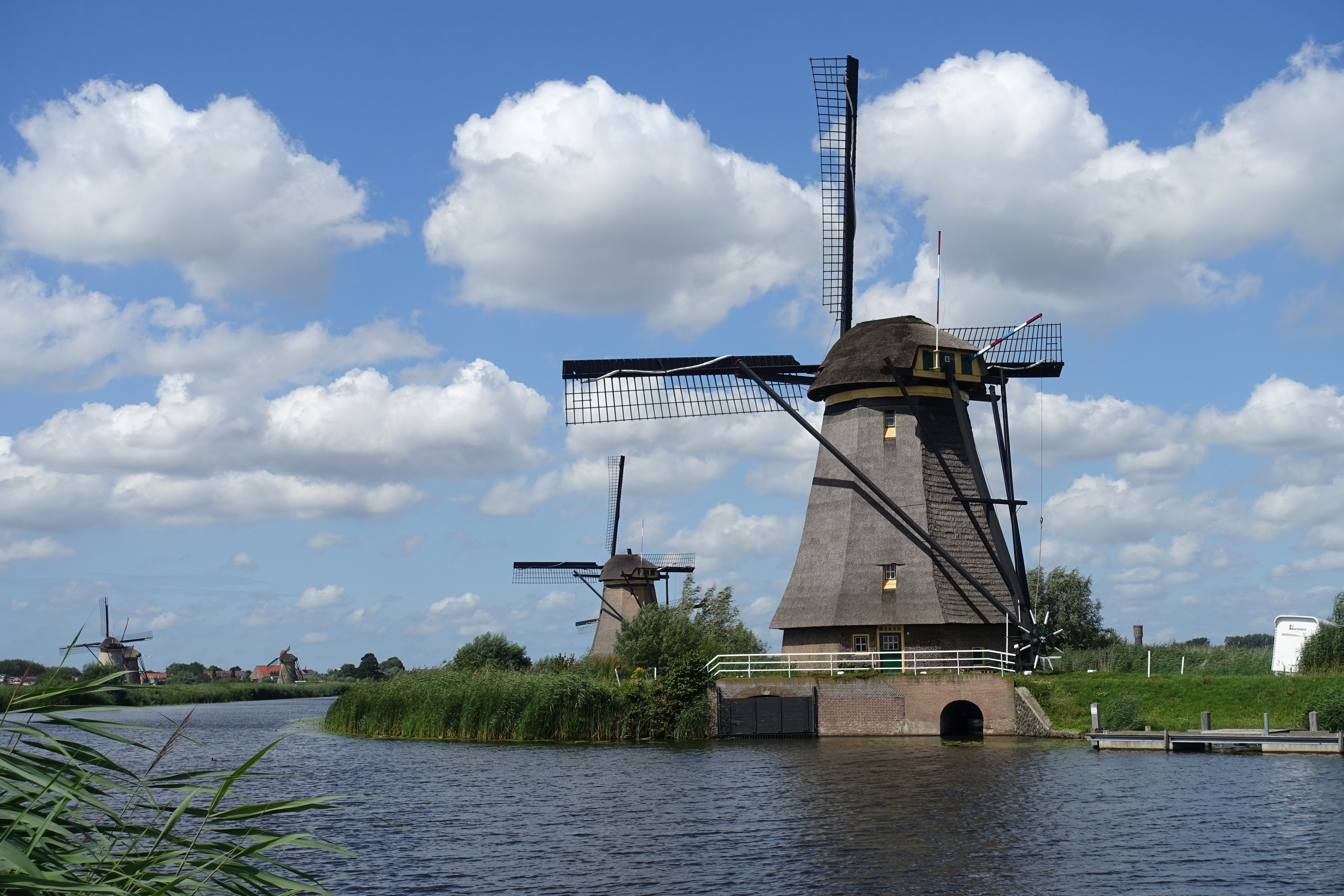
View of windmills of Kinderdijk

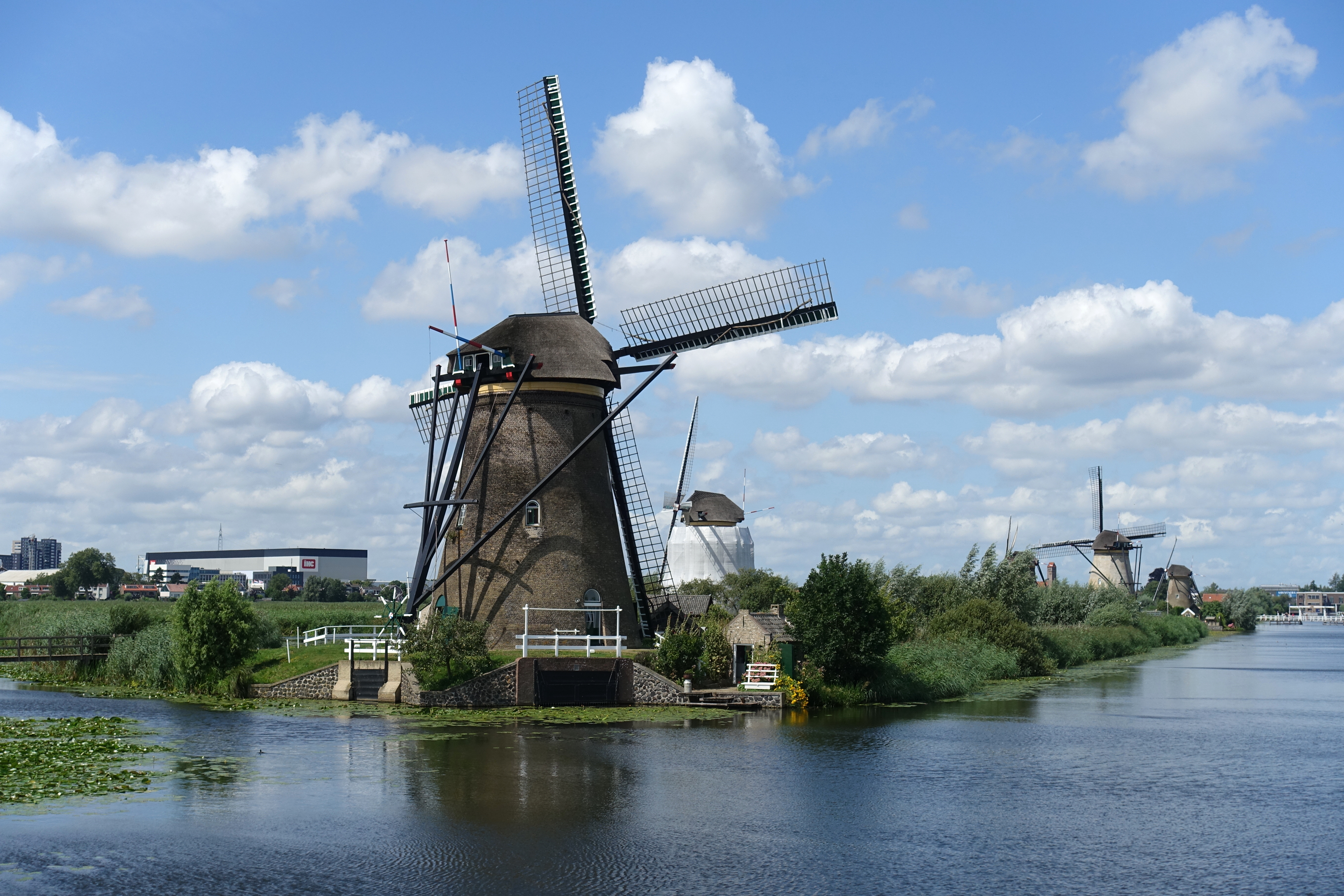
Kinderdijk windmills along the main canal

== See also ==
- Zaanse Schans, a similar popular tourist destination in the Netherlands

== Sources ==
- Griffis, William Elliot. The Cat and the Cradle in Dutch Fairy Tales For Young Folks. New York: Thomas Y. Crowell Co., 1918. (English). Available online by SurLaLane Fairy Tales. File retrieved 9-12-2007.
- Meder, Theo. Dutch folk narrative. Meertens Instituut, Amsterdam. File retrieved 9-12-2007.
- World Heritage List: Mill Network at Kinderdijk-Elshout
