= Oud-Alblas =

- Village
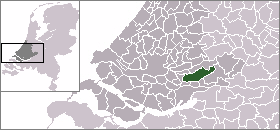

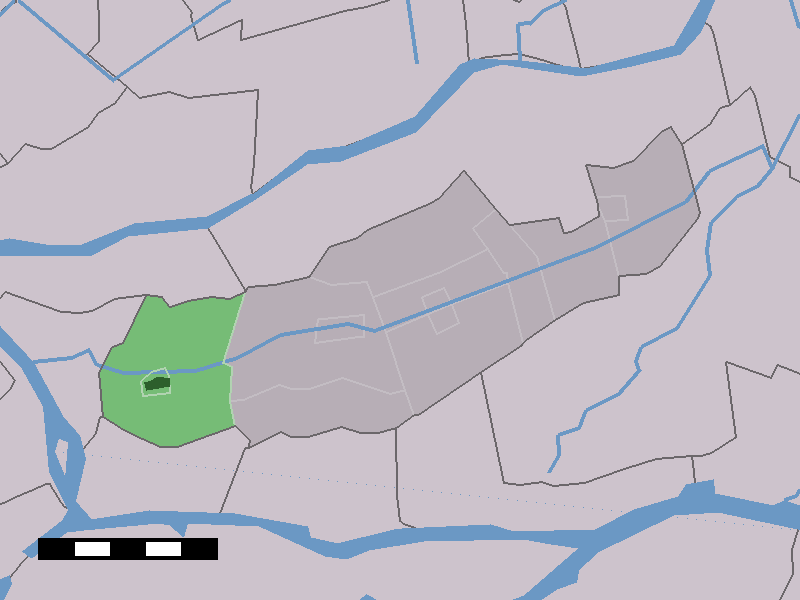
- The village centre (dark green) and the statistical district (light green) of Oud-Alblas in the former municipality of Graafstroom.
- Coordinates: 51°52′N 4°42′E
- Country: Netherlands
- Province: South Holland
- Municipality: Molenlanden

Area
  - Total: 13.1 km^{2} (5.1 sq mi)

Population (2008)
  - Total: 2,180
  - Density: 166/km^{2} (431/sq mi)
- Time zone: UTC+1 (CET)
  - Summer (DST): UTC+2 (CEST)

Oud-Alblas is a village in the Dutch province of South Holland. It is a part of the municipality of Molenlanden, and lies about 6 km north of Dordrecht.

In 2001, the village of Oud-Alblas had 1291 inhabitants. The built-up area of the village was 0.19 km^{2}, and contained 455 residences. The statistical area "Oud-Alblas", which also can include the peripheral parts of the village, as well as the surrounding countryside, has a population of around 2250.

Oud-Alblas was a separate municipality until 1986, when it became part of Graafstroom. Since 2013 Graafstroom has made part of the new municipality of Molenwaard.

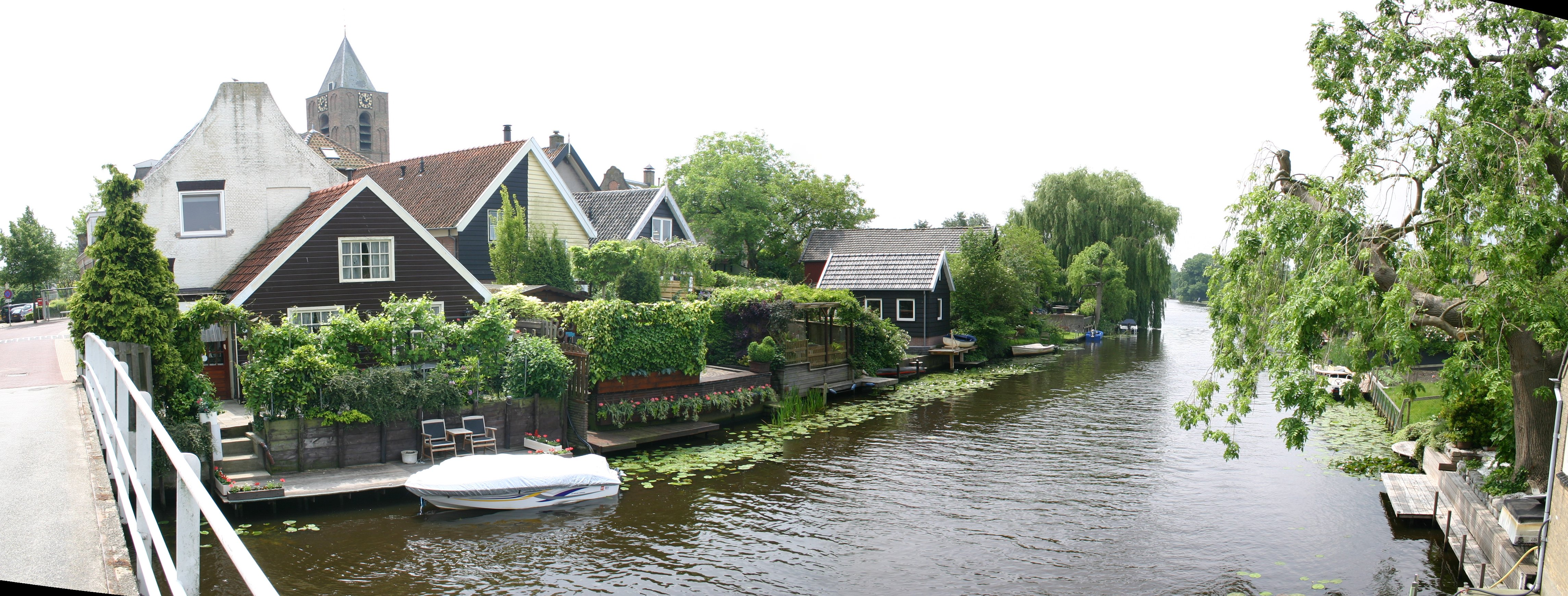
The river Alblas in Oud-Alblas

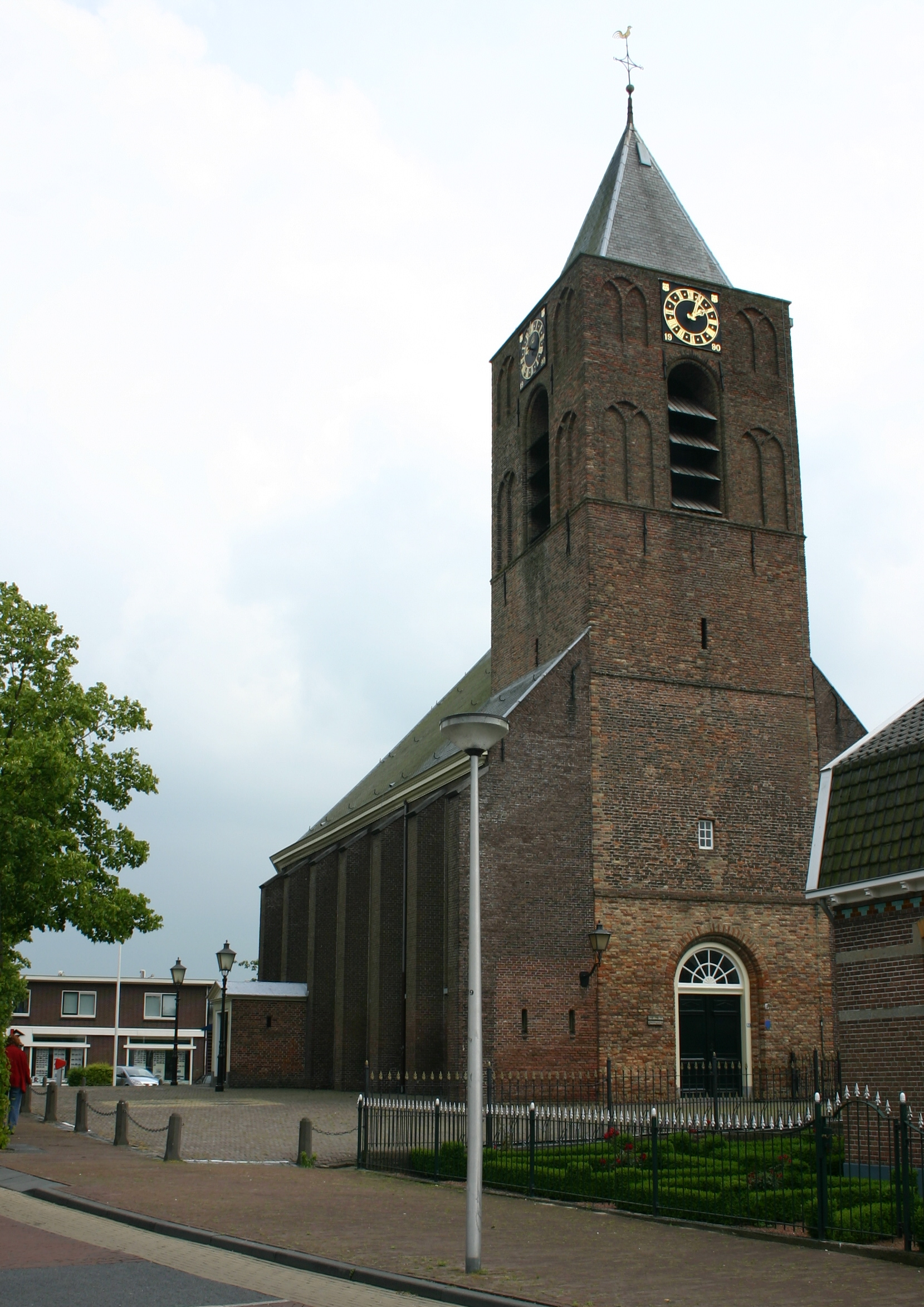
