= Langerak, South Holland =

Langerak
- Town
- Flag Coat of arms

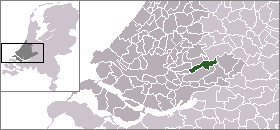

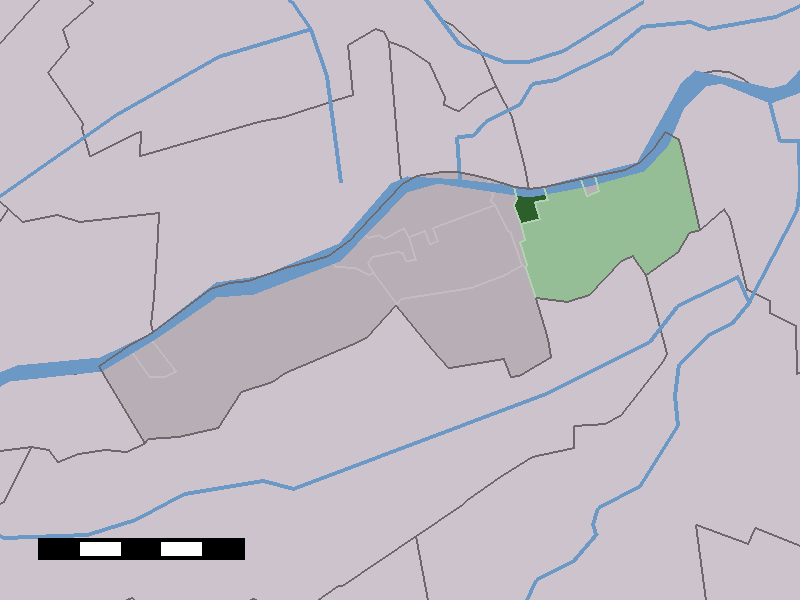
- The village (dark green) and the statistical district (light green) of Langerak in the former municipality of Liesveld.
- Coordinates: 51°56′0″N 4°52′30″E
- Country: Netherlands
- Province: South Holland
- Municipality: Molenlanden

Population (1 January 2005)
  - Total: 1,730
- Time zone: UTC+1 (CET)
  - Summer (DST): UTC+2 (CEST)

Langerak is a town in the Dutch province of South Holland. It is a part of the municipality of Molenlanden.

The village of "Langerak" has a population of around 1730. The statistical area "Langerak", which also can include the surrounding countryside, has a population of around 1730.

Langerak was a separate municipality between 1817 and 1986, when it became part of Liesveld. Since 2013 Liesveld has become part of the new municipality of Molenwaard.
