= Liesveld (former municipality) =

- Former municipality
- Flag Coat of arms

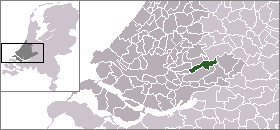
- Coordinates: 51°55′00″N 4°49′30″E
- Country: Netherlands
- Province: South Holland
- Municipality: Molenlanden

Area (2006)
  - Total: 44.44 km^{2} (17.16 sq mi)
  - Land: 41.07 km^{2} (15.86 sq mi)
  - Water: 3.37 km^{2} (1.30 sq mi)

Population (1 January 2007)
  - Total: 9,802
  - Density: 239/km^{2} (620/sq mi)
- Source: CBS, Statline.
- Time zone: UTC+1 (CET)
  - Summer (DST): UTC+2 (CEST)

Liesveld (Dutch pronunciation: [ˈlisfɛlt]) is a former municipality in the western Netherlands, in the province of South Holland, and the region of Alblasserwaard. The former municipality had a population of 9,810 in 2006, and covered an area of 44.44 km^{2} (17.16 sq mi) of which 3.37 km^{2} (1.30 sq mi) was water. Since 2013 Liesveld had been a part of the new municipality of Molenwaard (ceased to exist in 2019).

The former municipality of Liesveld was formed on 1 January 1986 from the former municipalities of Groot-Ammers, Langerak, Nieuwpoort, and Streefkerk. It consisted of the population centres Groot-Ammers, Langerak, Nieuwpoort, Streefkerk, and Waal.

Its name is probably derived from a low-lying swampy area filled with reed grasses (Dutch: lies - Glyceria maxima) near Gelkenes. Castle Liesvelt was built on such a reedy field, giving its name to the Lords of Liesvelt, who owned lands within the municipality.
