= Waal, South Holland =

Waal
- Hamlet
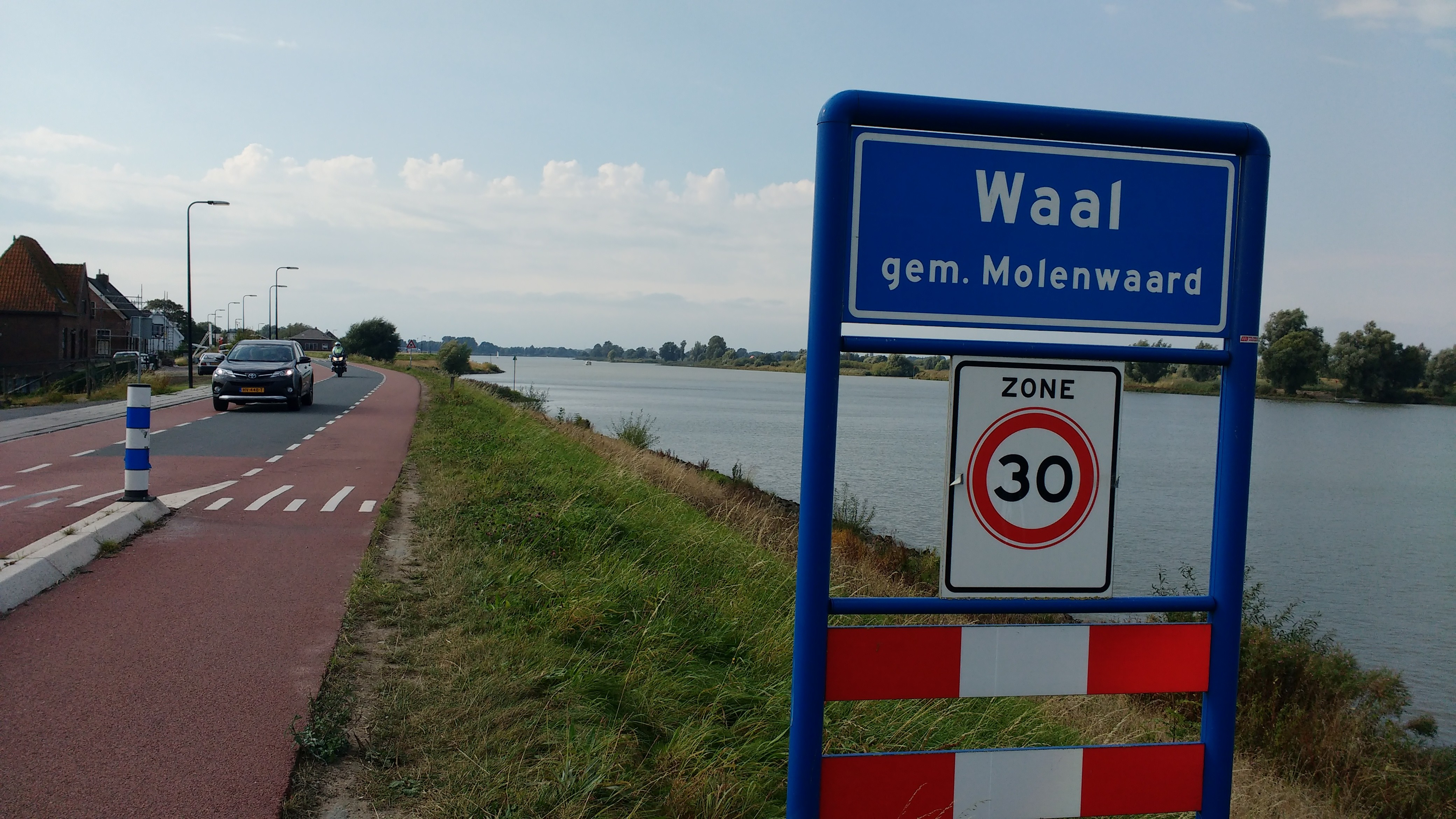

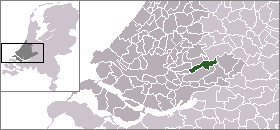

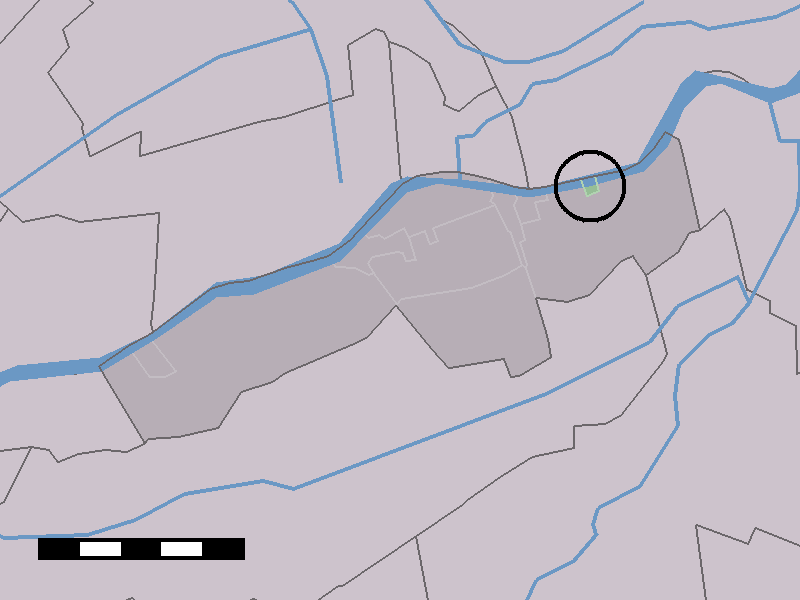
- The village (dark green) and the statistical district (light green) of Waal in the former municipality of Liesveld.
- Coordinates: 51°56′21″N 4°54′04″E
- Country: Netherlands
- Province: South Holland
- Municipality: Molenlanden

Population (1 jan 2001)
  - Total: 120
- Time zone: UTC+1 (CET)
  - Summer (DST): UTC+2 (CEST)
- Postal code: 2968
- Dialing code: 0184

Waal is a hamlet in the Dutch province of South Holland. It is a part of the municipality of Molenlanden, and lies about 13 km north of Gorinchem on the southside of the Lek River.

The statistical area "Waal", which also can include the surrounding countryside, has a population of around 110.
