= Goudriaan =

- Village
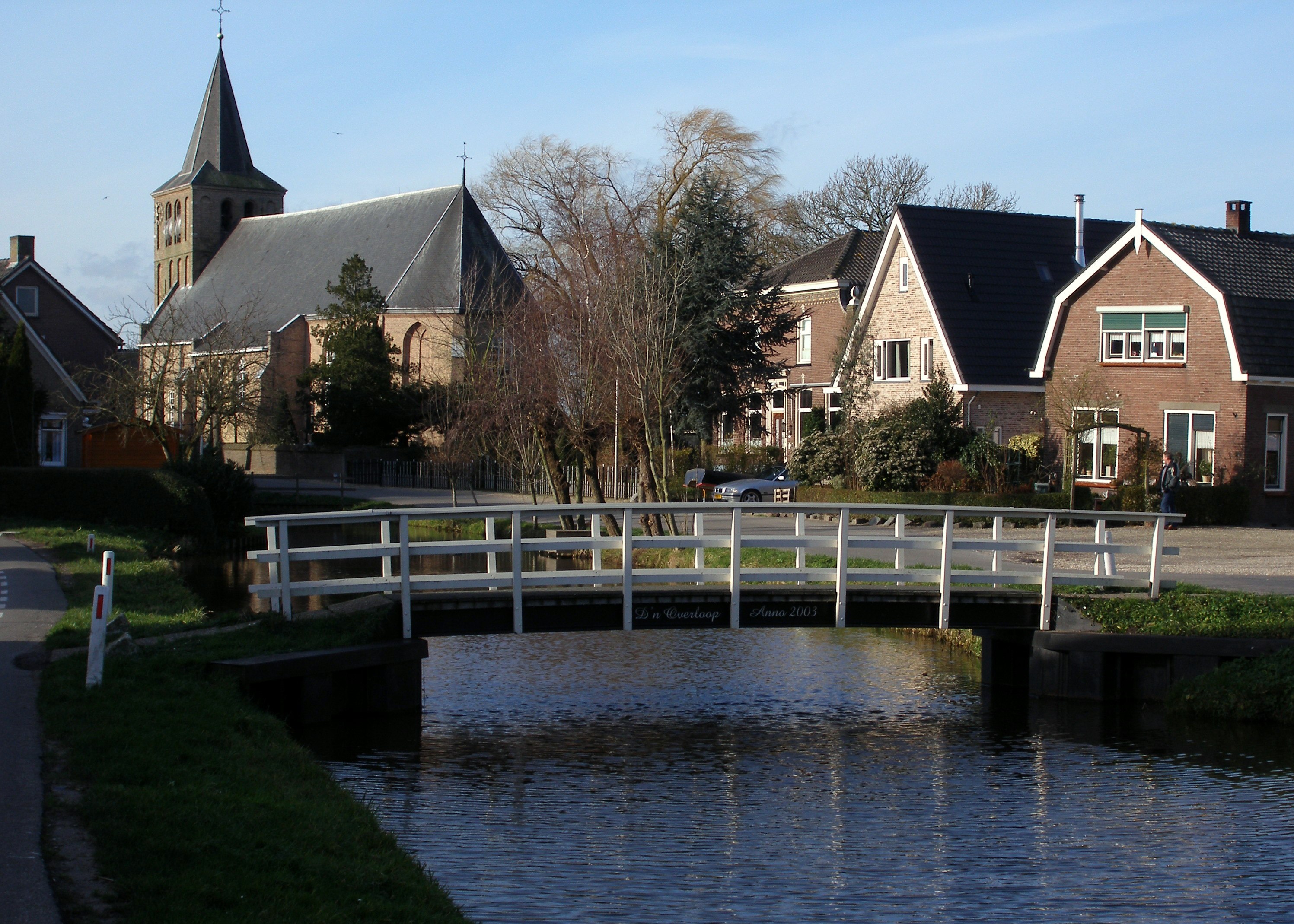
- Goudriaan, with the church originating from the fourteenth century

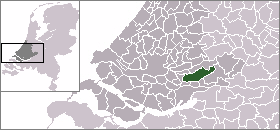

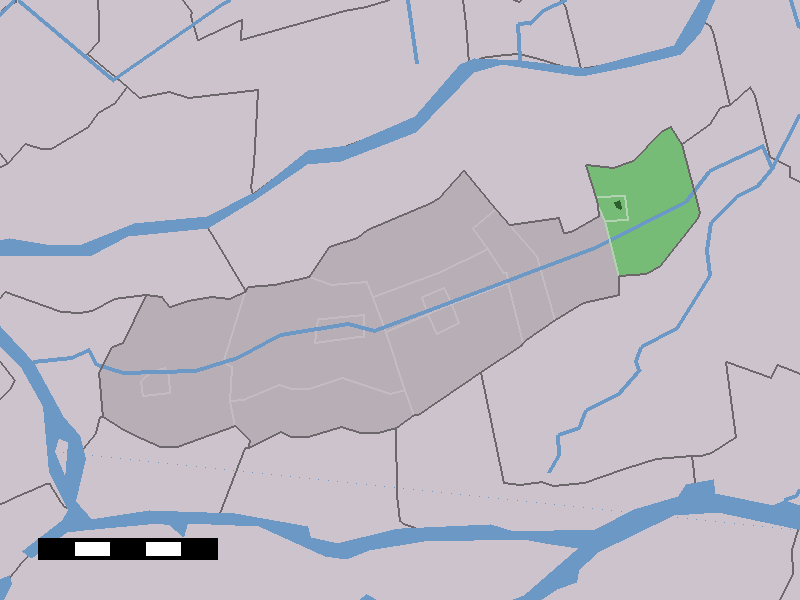
- The village centre (dark green) and the statistical district (light green) of Goudriaan in the former municipality of Graafstroom.
- Coordinates: 51°54′N 4°54′E
- Country: Netherlands
- Province: South Holland
- Municipality: Molenlanden

Area
  - Total: 8.08 km^{2} (3.12 sq mi)

Population (2008)
  - Total: 847
  - Density: 105/km^{2} (271/sq mi)
- Time zone: UTC+1 (CET)
  - Summer (DST): UTC+2 (CEST)

Goudriaan is a village in the Dutch province of South Holland, part of the municipality of Molenlanden since 2013, about 25 km east of Rotterdam. It was a separate municipality until 1986, when it joined Graafstroom. On 1 January 2006, it had 843 residents in 309 residences and a developed area of 0.028 km².
