= Brandwijk =

- Village
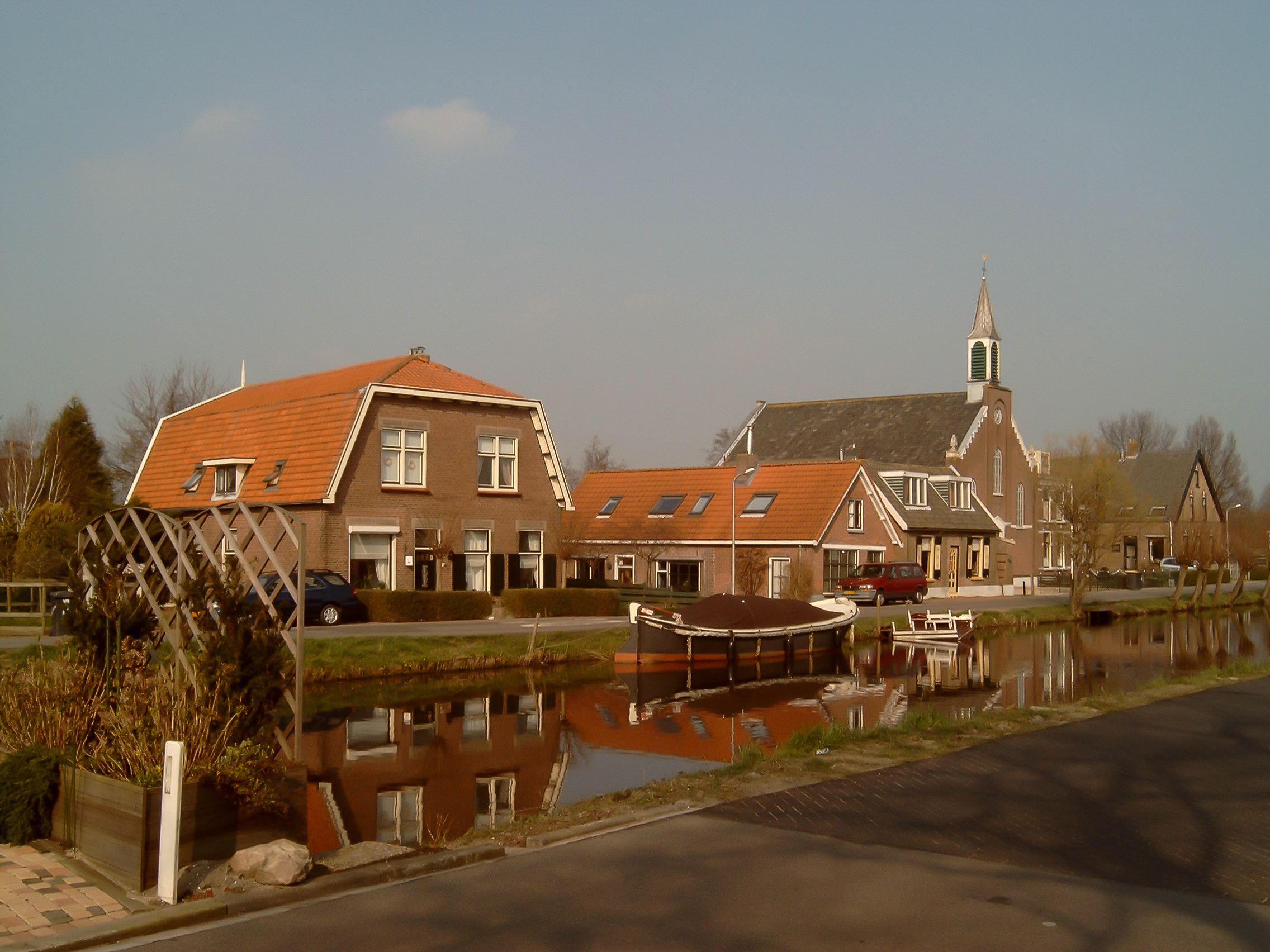
- Brandwijk, the village

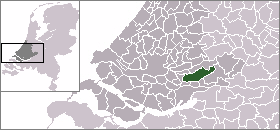

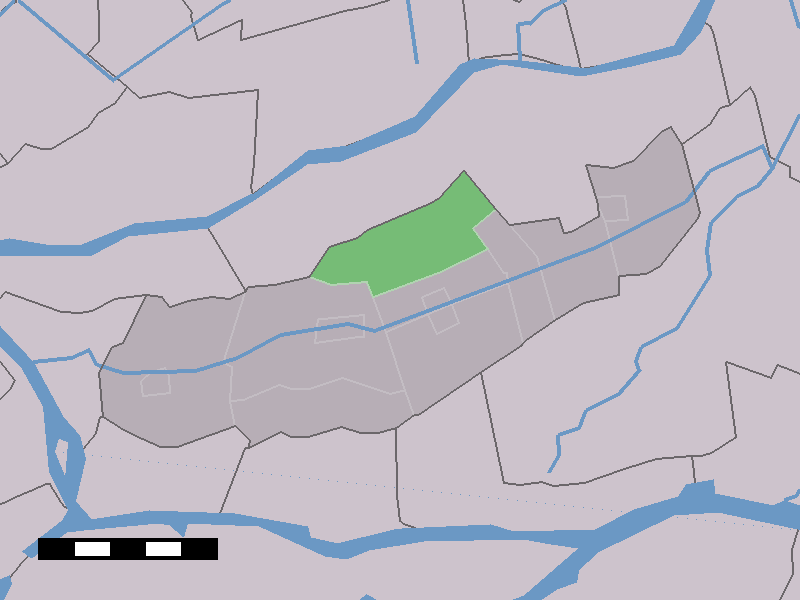
- Brandwijk in the former municipality of Graafstroom.
- Coordinates: 51°53′N 4°49′E
- Country: Netherlands
- Province: South Holland
- Municipality: Molenlanden

Area
  - Total: 12.3 km^{2} (4.7 sq mi)

Population
  - Total: 1,213
  - Density: 98.6/km^{2} (255/sq mi)
- Time zone: UTC+1 (CET)
  - Summer (DST): UTC+2 (CEST)

Brandwijk is a small village in the Dutch province of South Holland. It is a part of the municipality of Molenlanden, and lies about 13 km west of Gorinchem.

The statistical area "Brandwijk", which also includes the surrounding countryside, has a population of around 290.

Brandwijk was a separate municipality between 1817 and 1986, when it became part of Graafstroom. Last one has become part of Molenwaard in 2013.
