= Molenlanden =

Municipality in South Holland, Netherlands

- Municipality
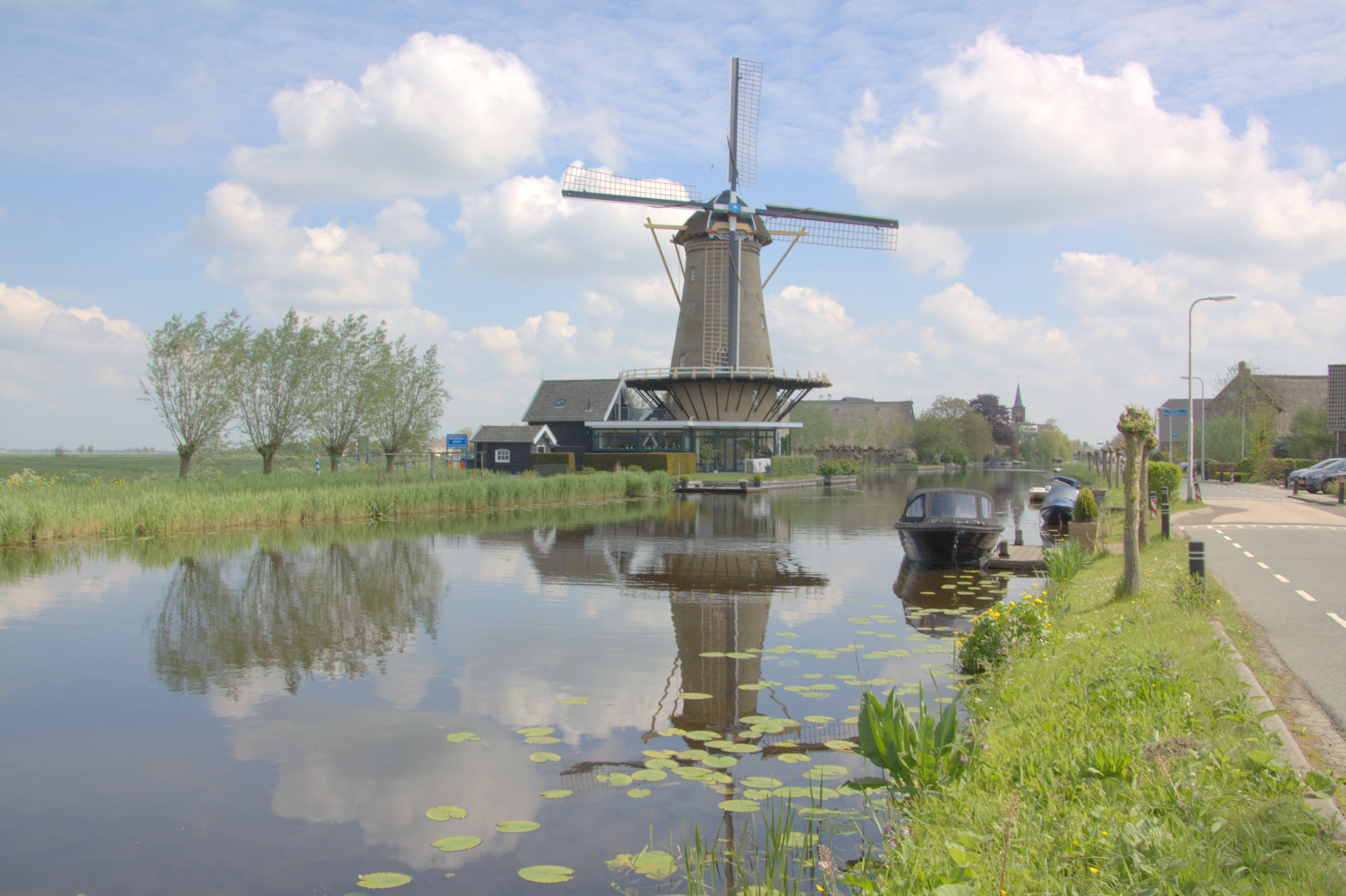
- De Vriendschap windmill in Bleskensgraaf

- Flag Coat of arms

- Location in South Holland

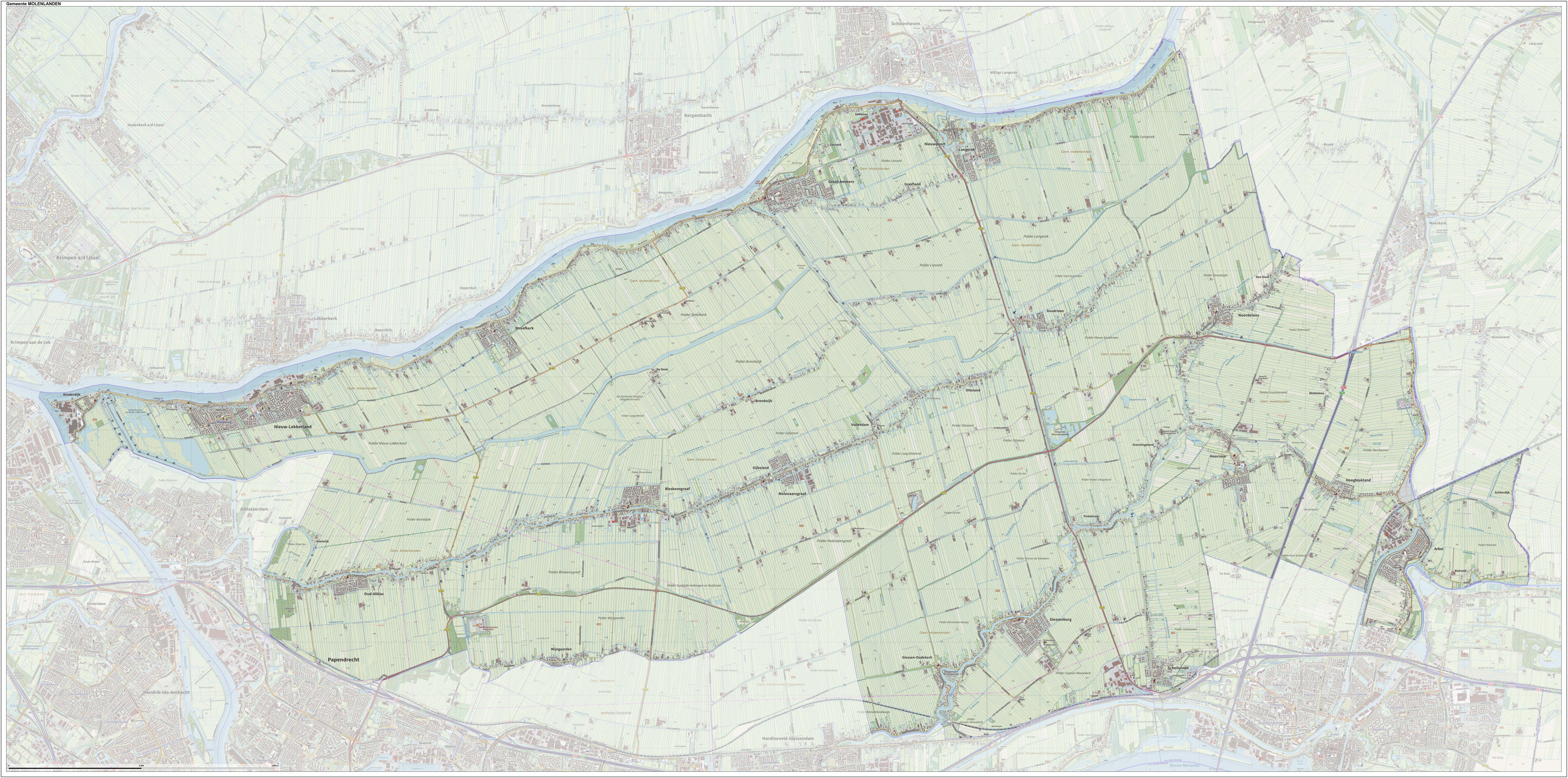
- Coordinates: 51°52′N 4°47′E
- Country: Netherlands
- Province: South Holland
- Established: 1 January 2019

Government
  - Body: Municipal council
  - Mayor: Theo Segers (Christian Union)

Population (1 January 2019)
  - Total: 43,858
  - Density: 241/km^{2} (620/sq mi)
- Time zone: UTC+1 (CET)
  - Summer (DST): UTC+2 (CEST)
- Website: www.molenlanden.nl

Molenlanden (Dutch pronunciation: [ˈmoːlə(n)ˌlɑndə(n)]) is a municipality in the province of South Holland in the Netherlands. The municipality was created on 1 January 2019 by merging the municipalities of Giessenlanden en Molenwaard. It is located east of Rotterdam along and south of the Lek. The World Heritage Site of Kinderdijk is in the municipality. Its largest population centers are Nieuw-Lekkerland and Giessenburg.

The municipality includes the settlements of Arkel, Bleskensgraaf, Brandwijk, De Donk, Gelkenes, Gijbeland, Giessen-Oudekerk, Giessenburg, Goudriaan, Graafland, Groot-Ammers, Hofwegen Hoogblokland, Hoornaar, Kinderdijk, Kooiwijk, Langerak, Liesveld, Molenaarsgraaf, Nieuw-Lekkerland, Nieuwpoort, Noordeloos, Ottoland, Oud-Alblas, Schelluinen, Streefkerk, Vuilendam, Waal, and Wijngaarden.
