= Ottoland =

- Village
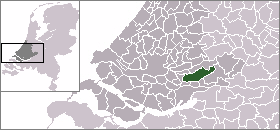

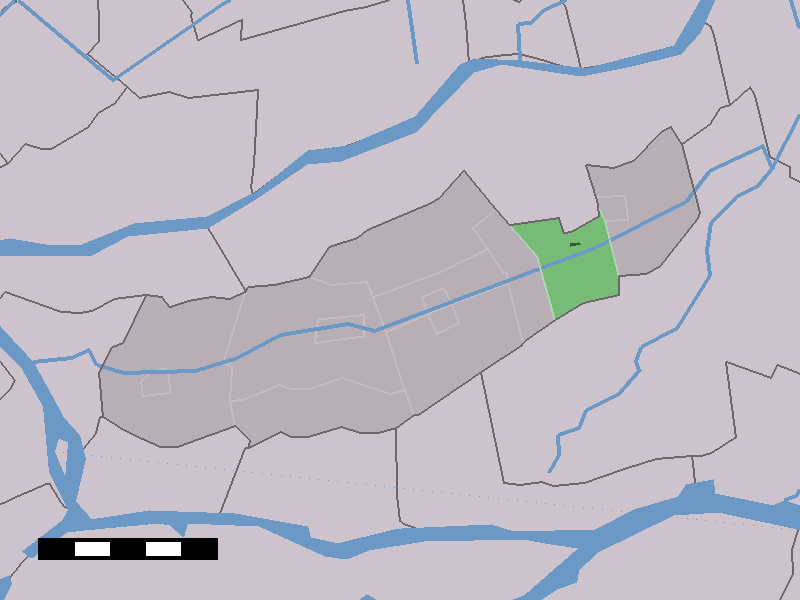
- The village centre (dark green) and the statistical district (light green) of Ottoland in the former municipality of Graafstroom.
- Coordinates: 51°54′N 4°52′E
- Country: Netherlands
- Province: South Holland
- Municipality: Molenlanden

Area
  - Total: 8.8 km^{2} (3.4 sq mi)

Population (2008)
  - Total: 985
  - Density: 110/km^{2} (290/sq mi)
- Time zone: UTC+1 (CET)
  - Summer (DST): UTC+2 (CEST)

Ottoland is a village in the Dutch province of South Holland. It is a part of the municipality of Molenlanden, and lies about 15 km northwest of Gorinchem.

In 2001, the village of Ottoland had 173 inhabitants. The built-up area of the village was 0.022 km², and contained 57 residences. The statistical area "Ottoland", which also can include the peripheral parts of the village, as well as the surrounding countryside, has a population of around 490.

Ottoland was a separate municipality between 1817 and 1986, until it became part of Graafstroom. In 2013, Graafstroom was made part of Molenwaard. Until the 1980s Ottoland had only two streets, simply called A and B.

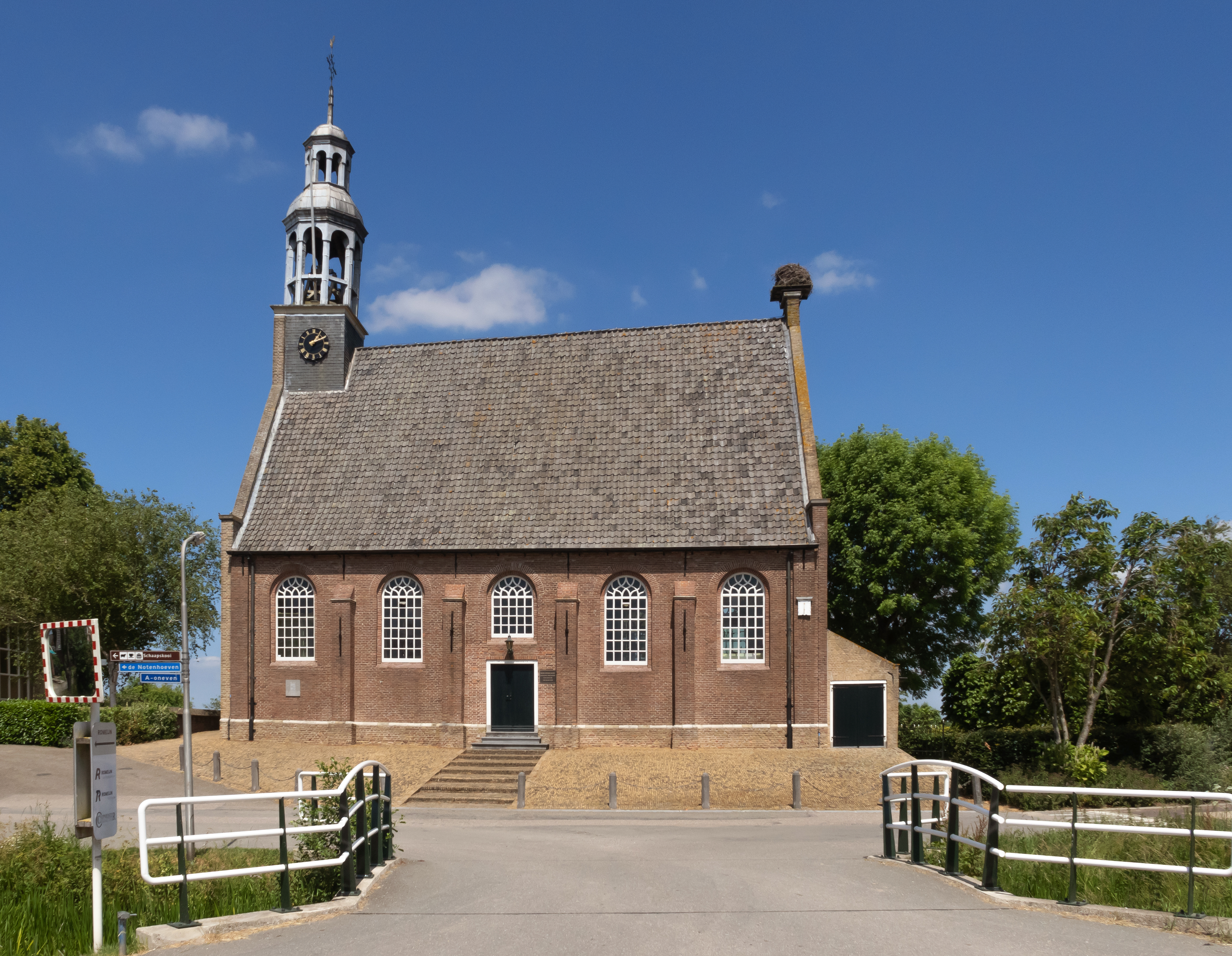
Reformed church in Ottoland

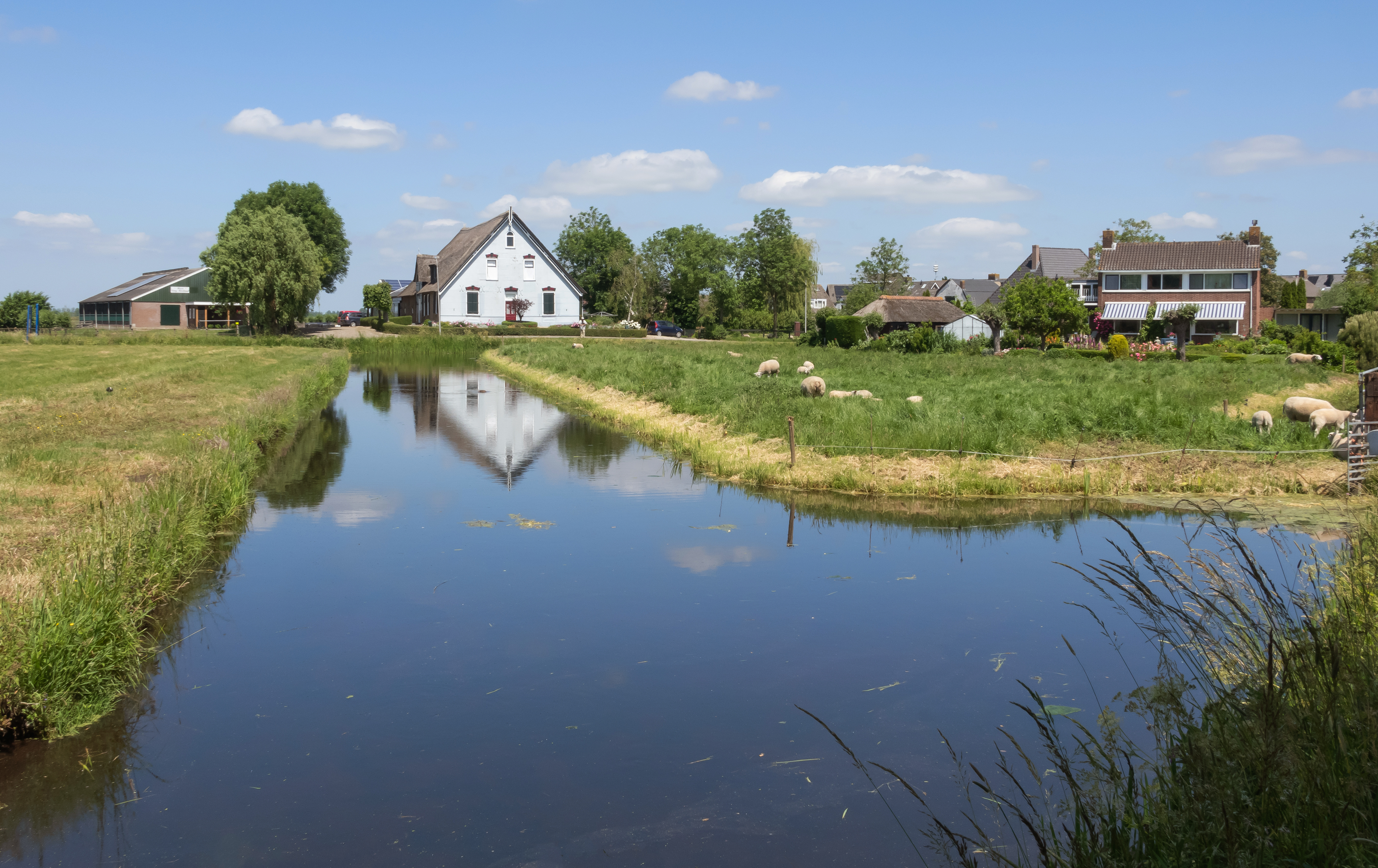
Farmhouse in the polder near Ottoland

== See also ==
- Laagblokland
