= Gelkenes =

- Hamlet
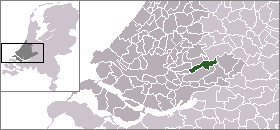

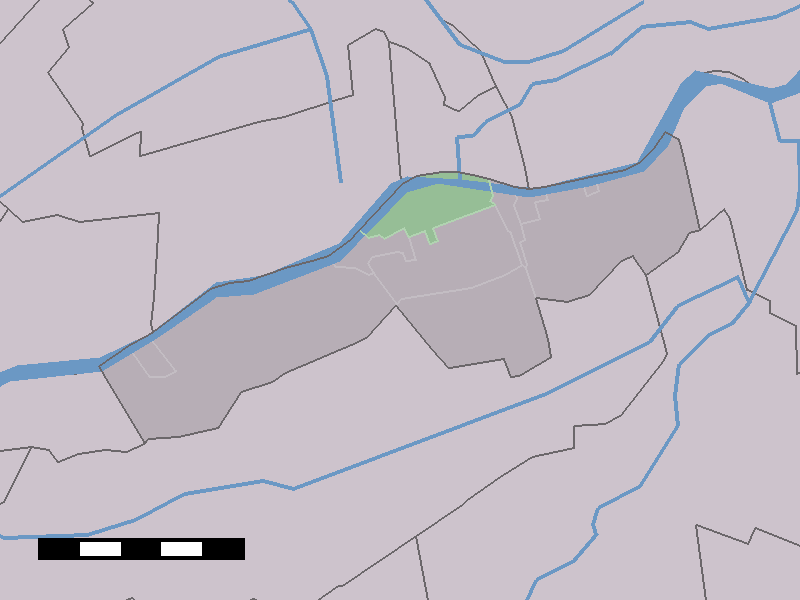
- The village (dark green) and the statistical district (light green) of Gelkenes in the former municipality of Liesveld.
- Coordinates: 51°56′20″N 4°50′46″E
- Country: Netherlands
- Province: South Holland
- Municipality: Molenlanden

Population (1 January 2005)
  - Total: 300
- Time zone: UTC+1 (CET)
  - Summer (DST): UTC+2 (CEST)

Gelkenes is a hamlet in the Dutch province of South Holland. It is a part of the municipality of Molenlanden, and lies about 12 km southeast of Gouda, on the southside of the Lek River.

The statistical area "Gelkenes", which also can include the surrounding countryside, has a population of around 300.
