= Groot-Ammers =

- Town
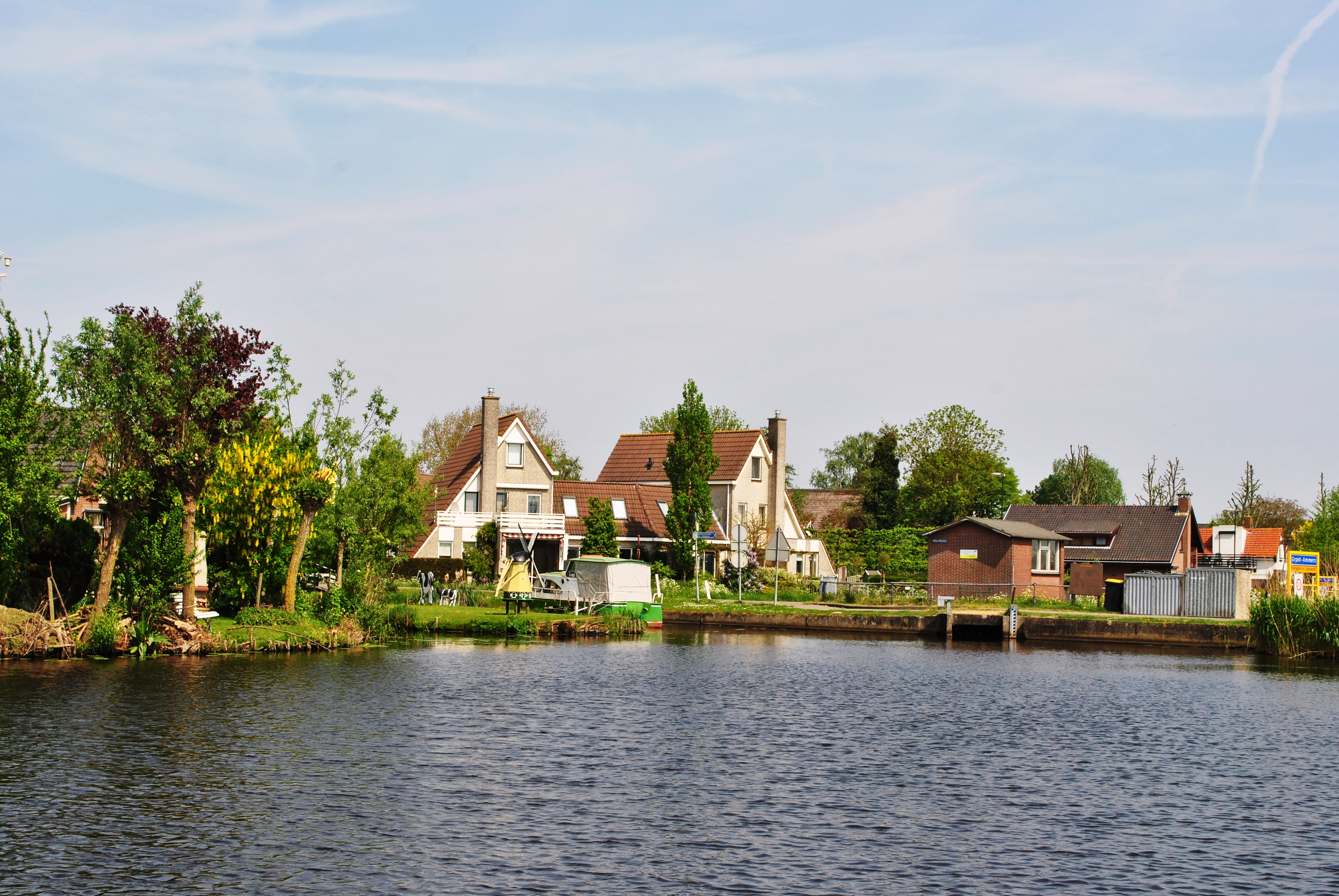

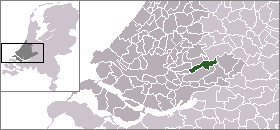

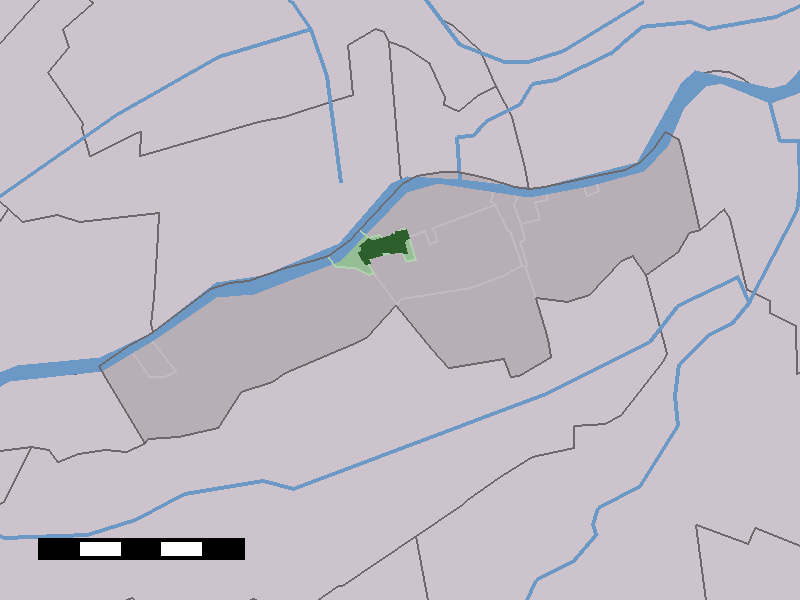
- The town centre (dark green) and the statistical district (light green) of Groot-Ammers in the former municipality of Liesveld.
- Coordinates: 51°55′N 4°49′E
- Country: Netherlands
- Province: South Holland
- Municipality: Molenlanden

Population (1 jan 2004)
  - Total: 3,886
- Time zone: UTC+1 (CET)
  - Summer (DST): UTC+2 (CEST)
- Postal code: 2964
- Dialing code: 0184

Groot-Ammers is a town in the Dutch province of South Holland. It is a part of the municipality of Molenlanden, and is located about 13 km southeast of Gouda on the southside of the Lek River.

In 2001, the town of Groot-Ammers had 2822 inhabitants. The built-up area of the town was 0.56 km², and contained 1059 residences. The statistical area "Groot-Ammers", which also includes the surrounding countryside, has a population of around 3100.

== History ==
The first mention of Groot-Ammers dates back to 1042. The lords of Liesvelt built their castle around that time as one of the largest and strongest castles of the Netherlands. The surroundings of the castle, including Groot-Ammers, stood under the influence of these lords.

Willem Frederik of Nassau bought the barony of Liesvelt in 1636.

In modern times the barony of Liesvelt became the municipality of Groot-Ammers. In 1986 Groot-Ammers and bordering municipalities aggregated to form the municipality of Liesveld, which on 1 January 2019 merged with Giessenlanden to form Molenlanden.

Notably, Groot-Ammers boasts the Headquarters of International Heavy transport company Van der Vlist.
