= Graafstroom (former municipality) =

- Former municipality
- Flag Coat of arms

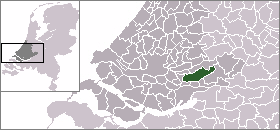
- Coordinates: 51.88°N 4.80°E
- Country: Netherlands
- Province: South Holland
- Municipality: Molenlanden

Area (2006)
  - Total: 69.32 km^{2} (26.76 sq mi)
  - Land: 67.11 km^{2} (25.91 sq mi)
  - Water: 2.21 km^{2} (0.85 sq mi)

Population (1 January 2007)
  - Total: 9,757
  - Density: 145/km^{2} (380/sq mi)
- Source: CBS, Statline.
- Time zone: UTC+1 (CET)
  - Summer (DST): UTC+2 (CEST)
- Website: www.graafstroom.nl

Graafstroom (Dutch pronunciation: [ɣraːfˈstroːm]) is a former municipality in the western Netherlands, in the province of South Holland, and the region of Alblasserwaard. The former municipality had a population of 9,697 in 2004, and covered an area of 69.32 km^{2} (26.76 sq mi) of which 2.21 km^{2} (0.85 sq mi) was water. Since 2013 Graafstroom had been a part of the new municipality of Molenwaard (which ceased to exist in 2019 when they were both merged into Molenlanden).

The former municipality of Graafstroom consisted of the following population centres: Bleskensgraaf en Hofwegen, Brandwijk, Goudriaan, Molenaarsgraaf, Ottoland, Oud-Alblas, and Wijngaarden.
