= Molenaarsgraaf =

- Village
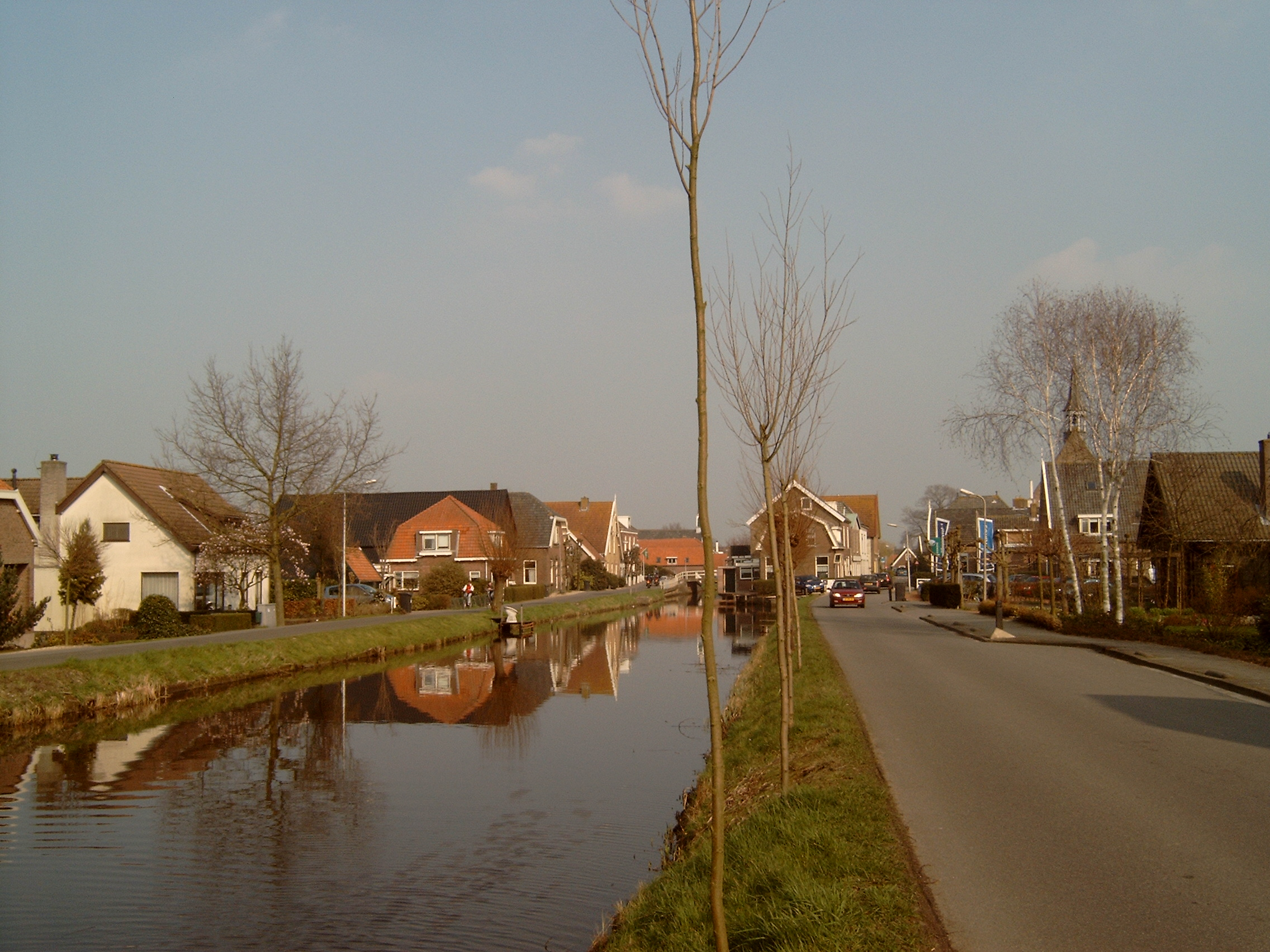
- Molenaarsgraaf, the village

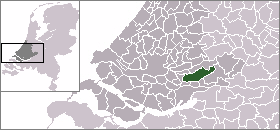

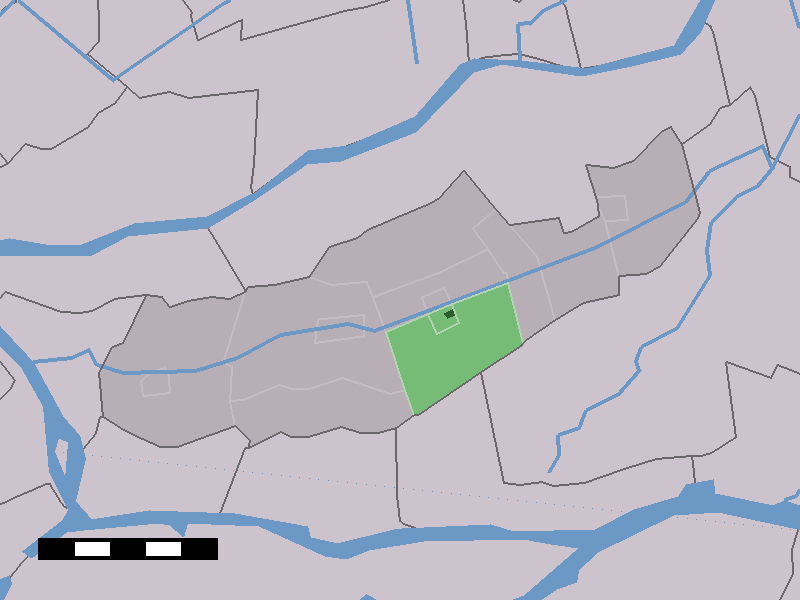
- The village centre (dark green) and the statistical district (light green) of Molenaarsgraaf in the former municipality of Graafstroom.
- Coordinates: 51°53′N 4°50′E
- Country: Netherlands
- Province: South Holland
- Municipality: Molenlanden

Population
  - Total: 1,086
- Time zone: UTC+1 (CET)
  - Summer (DST): UTC+2 (CEST)

Molenaarsgraaf is a village in the Dutch province of South Holland. It is a part of the municipality of Molenlanden, and lies about 11 km west of Gorinchem.

In 2001, the village of Molenaarsgraaf had 414 inhabitants. The built-up area of the village was 0.041 km², and contained 143 residences. The statistical area "Molenaarsgraaf", which also can include the peripheral parts of the village, as well as the surrounding countryside, has a population of around 1110.

Molenaarsgraaf was a separate municipality until 1986, when it became part of Graafstroom. Latterly it has been part of Molenwaard since 2013.

The village contains the War Grave of a Royal Air Force Avro Lancaster crew (less the pilot, who had parachuted to safety). Their names are recorded in Commonwealth War Graves web site as being killed on 22 May 1944. It is understood that their aircraft was shot down by a German night fighter.
