= Lewenborg =

Neighbourhood of Groningen, Netherlands

Coordinates: 53°14′23″N 6°37′29″E

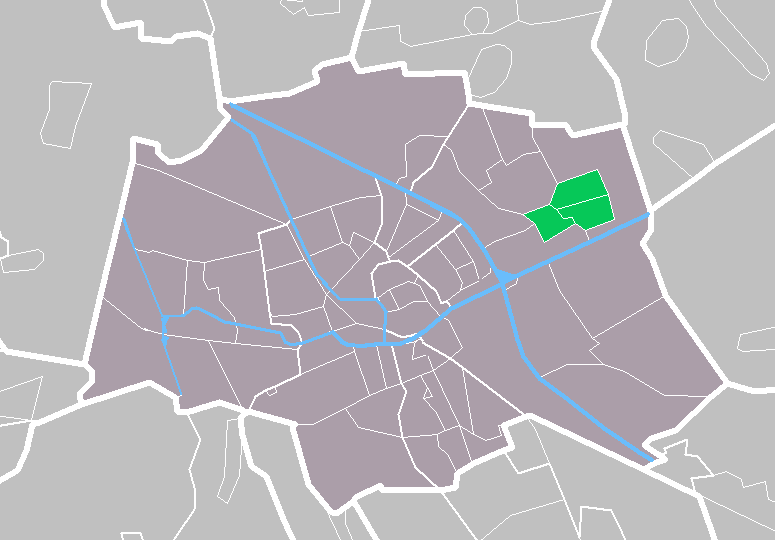
Location of Lewenborg inside the municipality of Groningen

Lewenborg is a green suburb in the east of the city of Groningen in the Netherlands. It had 9,115 residents as of 2016. Its construction began in 1971.

The heart of Lewenborg consists of the shopping mall and the community center, Het Dok. All of Lewenborg's street names are references to nautical terms. Even the institutions and schools in this neighbourhood carry nautical names. The streets of Zilvermeer (Silverlake), Mooiland (Prettyland), Waterland and Zonland (Sunland) (the last three in the ecological quarter, Drielanden) are also part of Lewenborg. However, they do not concur with Lewenborg's regular nomenclature.

In the past few years, Lewenborg has undergone a suburban-renewal project. The plan consists of the creation of a canal which runs right through Lewenborg—the Lewenborgsingel. Before the digging began, three big flats had to be demolished: the Sloepflat in the fall of 1999, the Toplichtflat in the spring of 2000, and the Kombuisflat in 2005. The western portion of the canal was finished first, and the eastern portion is now also complete. After the move of Lewenborg's medical center to its new location on Kajuit, both parts of the Lewenborgsingel were connected.

== History ==
Lewenborg is situated in a very old area. Originally the surroundings were terrains of bog-on-clay. The major development of bogs started around the year 1000, mostly because of the efforts of several monasteries. The harvesting (of peat) occurred on the higher located levees, which resulted in ribbon development (see for example Engelbert and Noorddijk) and relatively small lots (see for example the EDON-woods). In a later period, the mining of the bogs caused the ground to sink. At first, they tried to dig ditches (for example the Kardingermaar and the Zuidwending) to drain off the increasingly waterlogged lots. This proved to be insufficient, and major adjustments like water boards, polders, and dikes were deemed necessary.

In presumably the twelfth century, the Stadsweg arose. This was a route from Groningen via Noorddijk en Garmerwolde to the Ems. This old route disappeared with the construction of Lewenborg. However, two small pieces of it still remain: the bicycling path from the Stadsweg in Oosterhogebrug between the football fields of FC Lewenborg to Lichtboei; and on the other side of Lewenborg, the part of the bicycling path from Wimpel to the Bevrijdingsbos and in the direction of Garmerwolde. In 2007 a plan arose to dig up the Stadsweg in the Le Roygebied and pull it through from Wimpel.

== Sport clubs ==
Amateur association football club F.C. Lewenborg, founded in 1976, is located at Sportpark Lewenborg, Kluiverboom.

== Schools ==
Lewenborg has three elementary schools. It used to have six, but the Ketelbinkie and De Brandaris fused in 1995 into De Tweemaster. The schools Radar and De Swoaistee fused in 2005. After that, the old building of Radar was demolished to make way for the construction of new Swoaistee classrooms. In 2012, De Tweemaster and De Catamaran needed to fuse because they would have gone bankrupt if they had remained as separate schools. The fuse resulted in the new school OBS De Vuurtoren. The fuse was not received well by a lot of parents, who thought De Tweemaster's children would hold the children of De Catamaran back, because of the poor performances of De Tweemaster. After the fuse, Het Kompas moved into the building where De Tweemaster used to be located. The old building of Het Kompas was turned into a daycare.

The current elementary schools are:

- De Swoaistee (public, Jenaplan), Kiel
- De Vuurtoren (public), Vaargeul
- Het Kompas (Christian), Valreep

Other schools

- Alfa College (Vocational education), Kluiverboom
- The vmbo departments of several secondary schools, such as the Wessel Gansfortcollege and H.N. Werkmancollege, Kluiverboom
- De Kimkiel, a special education school, Kluiverboom

In the past there were several schools that, albeit temporary, were based in Lewenborg. For example, there was a Waldorf school on Baken for quite some time.

== Streets ==
- Anker (Anchor)
- Bakboord (Port)
- Baken (Beacon)
- Boeg (Bow)
- Bolder (Bollard)
- Fok (Jib)
- Dek (Deck)
- Dukdalf (Dolphin)
- Gangboord (Gunwale)
- Golfslag (Wind wave)
- Grootzeil (Mainsail)
- Het Want (Stays)
- Kajuit (Cabin)
- Kiel (Keel)
- Kluisgat (Hawsehole)
- Kluiverboom (Jib boom)
- Kombuis (Galley)
- Kraaienest (Crow's nest)
- Langszij
- Lichtboei (Light buoy)
- Lijzijde (Leeward)
- Loefzijde (Windward)
- Loopplank (Gangway)
- Mast (Mast)
- Meerpaal (Bollard)
- Midscheeps (Midships)
- Overloop (Ship Corridor)
- Patrijspoort (Porthole)
- Ra (Yard)
- Reling (Handrail)
- Roer (Rudder)
- Sloep (Sloop)
- Stuurhut (Steering cabin)
- Steiger (Pier)
- Stuurboordwal (Starboard)
- Toplicht (Navigation light)
- Vaargeul (Shipping fairway)
- Valreep (Gangway)
- Vooronder (Frontcabin)
- Wimpel (Pennon)
