= Bevrijdingsbos =

Forest in Groningen (Netherlands)

Coordinates: 53.2436°N 6.6346°E

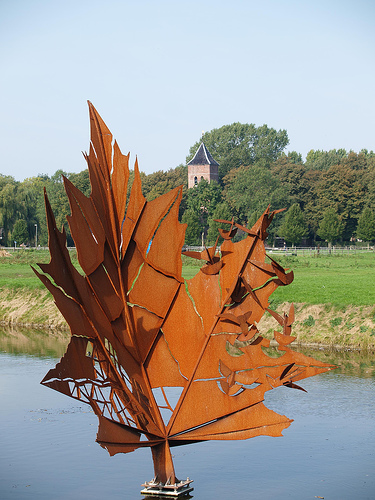
The Maple Leaf monument.

The Bevrijdingsbos (Dutch pronunciation: [bəˈvrɛidɪŋzˌbɔs]; lit. 'Liberation forest') is a forest on the edge of the city of Groningen between the district Lewenborg and the village of Garmerwolde in the Netherlands.

The forest was planted in 1995 to commemorate the 50th year of liberation of the Netherlands by the Canadian Army in 1945. The forest is an acknowledgement and tribute to the Canadian armed forces who liberated Groningen in April 1945.

The forest consists of 30,000 maple trees, of which the leaf is the national symbol of Canada.

In and next to the Bevrijdingsbos the so-called 'Plein van de Wereld' (Square of the World), an information sign, a memoriam bench and a monument engraved with the names of the Canadian army units who liberated the city and forced out the Germans can be found.

A path with large stones from ten countries runs through the forest. The Ten fundamental rights of children is written on the stones. The path ends with a stone which reads the eleventh right: The right of children to play outside freely and safely.
