= Garmerwolde =

Garmerwolde Gaarmwol or Gaarmerwold (Gronings)
- Village
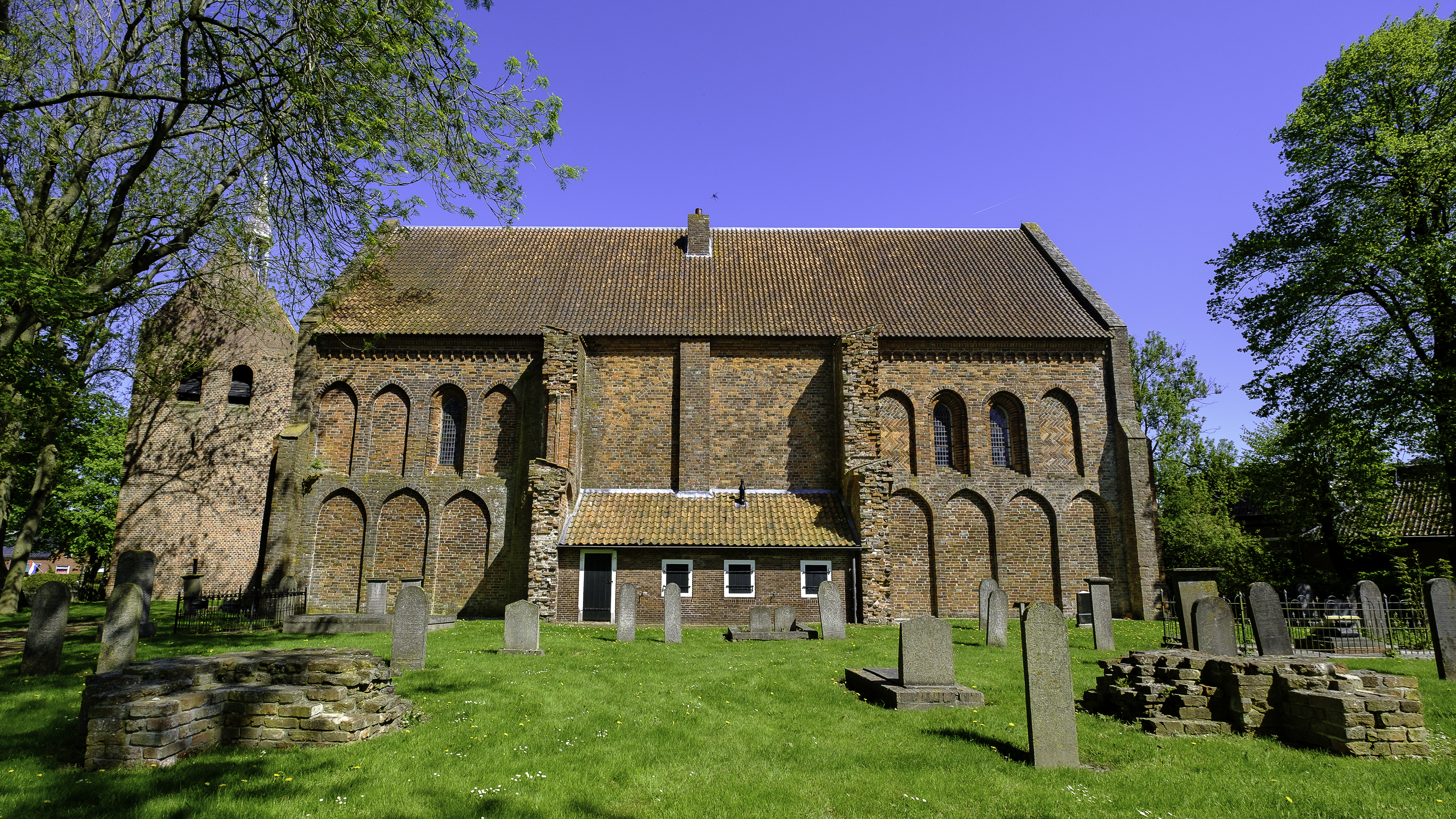
- Church of Garmerwolde

- Location in the province of Groningen in the Netherlands Garmerwolde (Netherlands)
- Coordinates: 53°15′N 6°39′E
- Country: Netherlands
- Province: Groningen
- Municipality: Groningen
- Elevation: −0.5 m (−1.6 ft)

Population (2021)
  - Total: 495
- Demonym: Garmerwolder
- Time zone: UTC+1 (CET)
  - Summer (DST): UTC+2 (CEST)
- Postcode: 9798
- Area code: 050

Garmerwolde (Dutch: [ˌɣɑrmərˈʋɔldə]; Gronings: Gaarmwol or Gaarmerwold) is a village in the municipality of Groningen in the province of Groningen in the Netherlands. The village is partly located on the Damsterdiep and has a population of 495 (2021). Until 1 January 2019 the village belonged to the municipality of Ten Boer.

== History ==
In the Middle Ages there was peat in the region (which explains the toponymic suffix -wold). Subdivision patterns show that the village was created by reclamation from the western bank of the Fivelboezem. Perpendicular to the direction of allotment, residential axes arose, of which Garmerwolde was the last. Then they encountered the reclamation from the west bank of the Hunze from which Noorddijk had arisen. The Borgsloot forms the border between these two allotment axes.

The first habitation in Garmerwolde dates back to the 11th or 12th century. The Romano-Gothic church of Garmerwolde with its free-standing tower dates from around 1250. There used to be two borgs in the vicinity of the village. The village was probably named after one of those borgs, Gelmersma. The other borg was the Tackenborg.

== Monuments ==
- The Langelandstermolen, a polder mill from 1829 Between Garmerwolde and Thesinge
- The Church of Garmerwolde

== Gallery ==
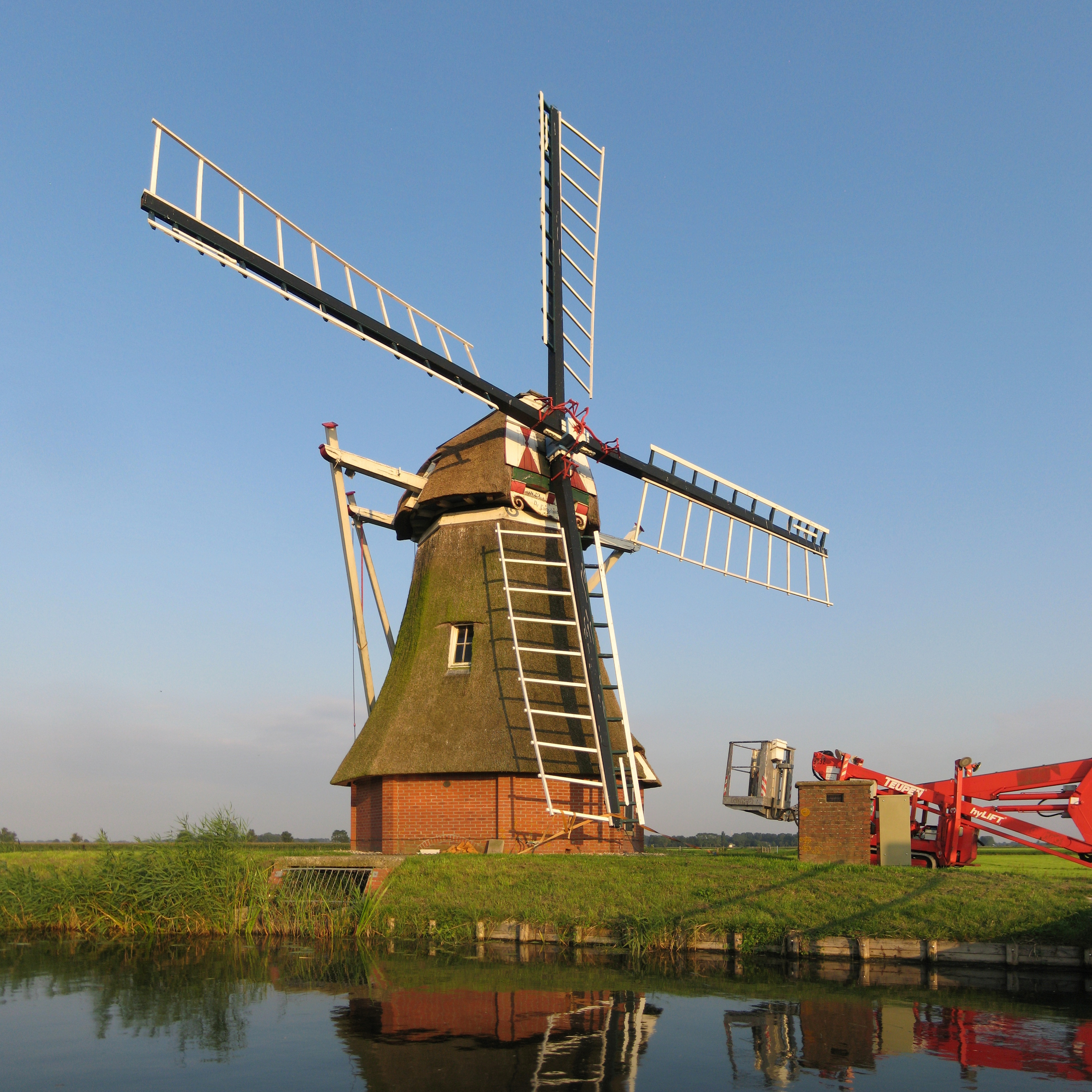
Langelandstermolen

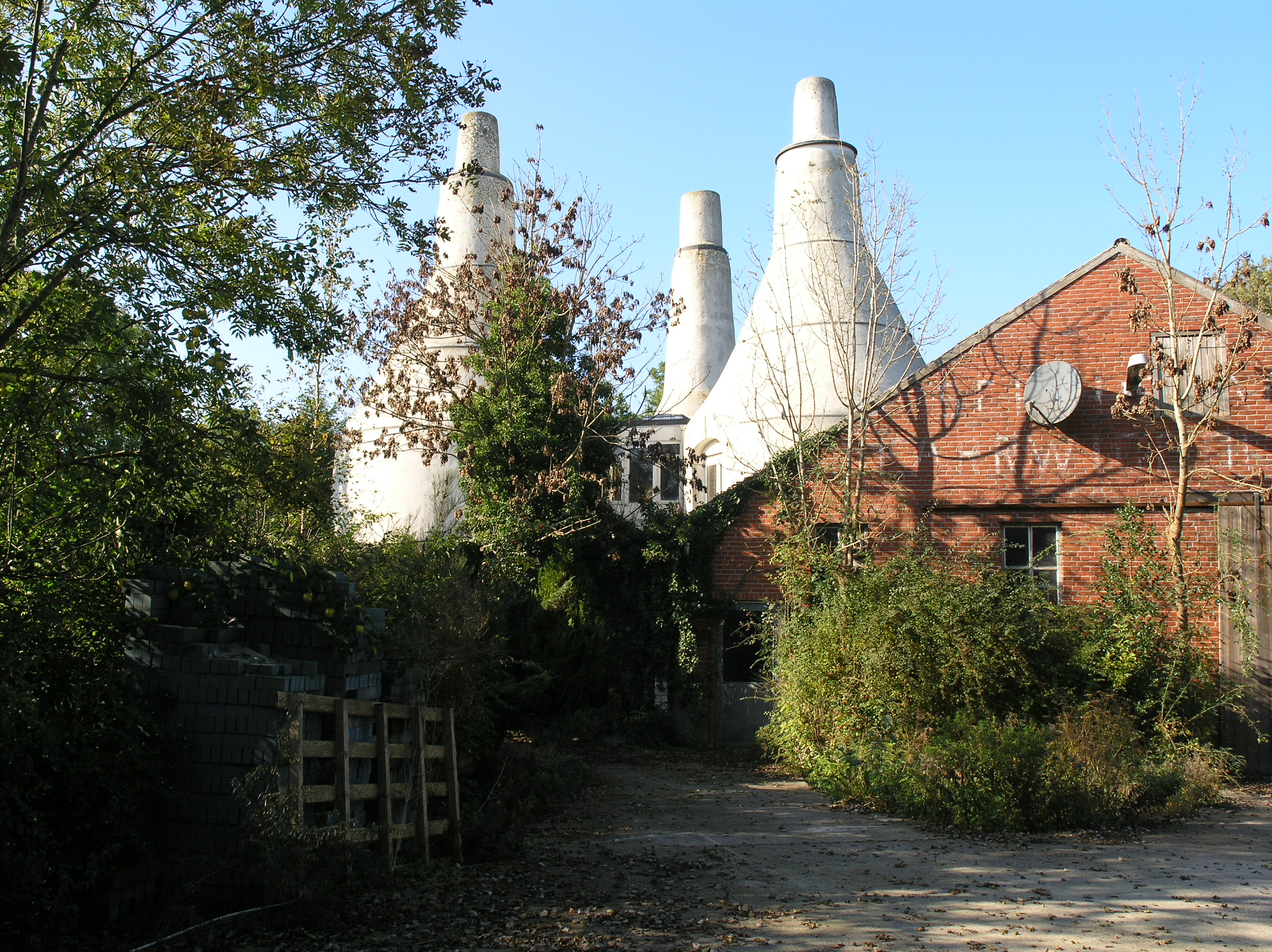
Lime kilns of Garmerwolde

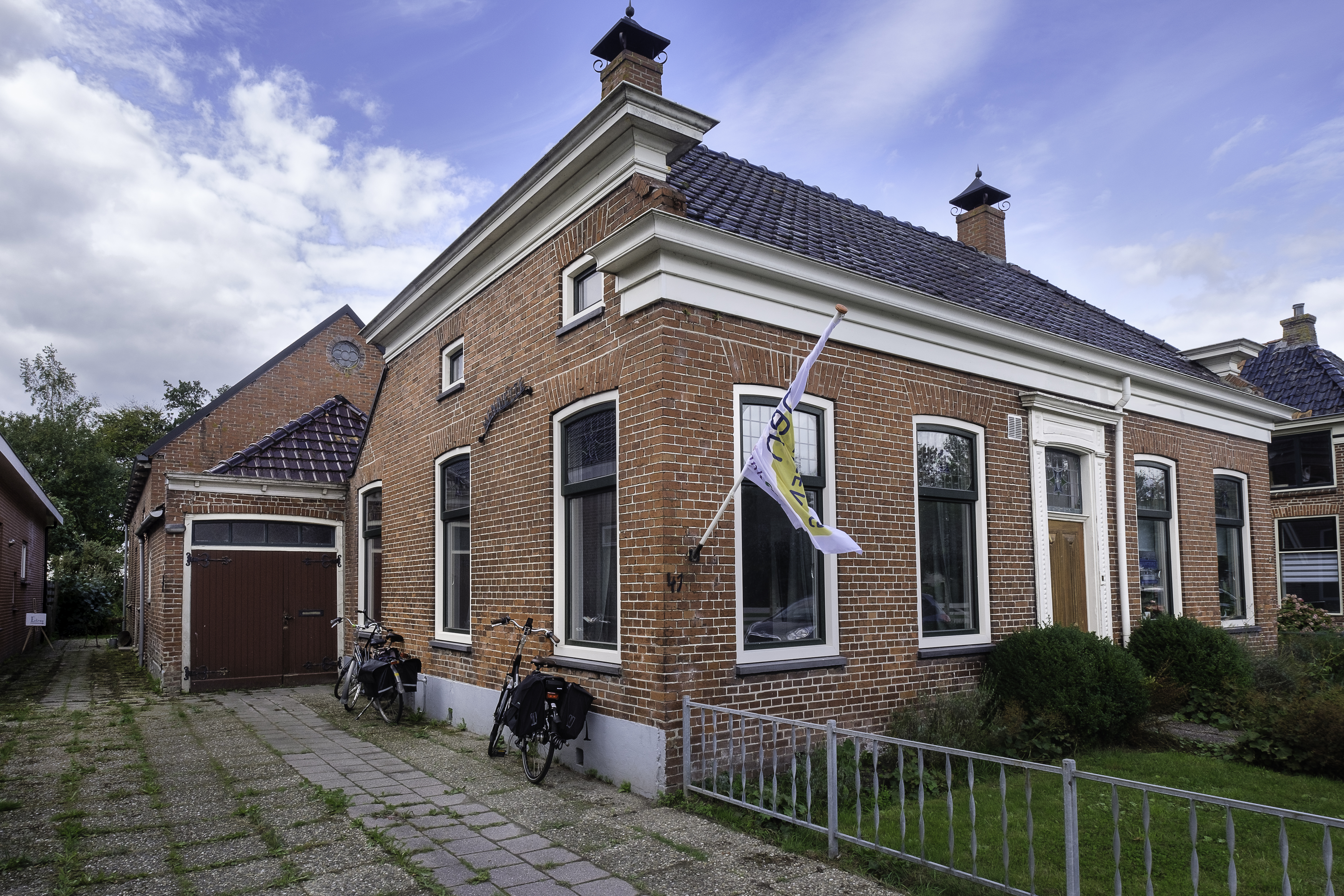
House in Garmerwolde

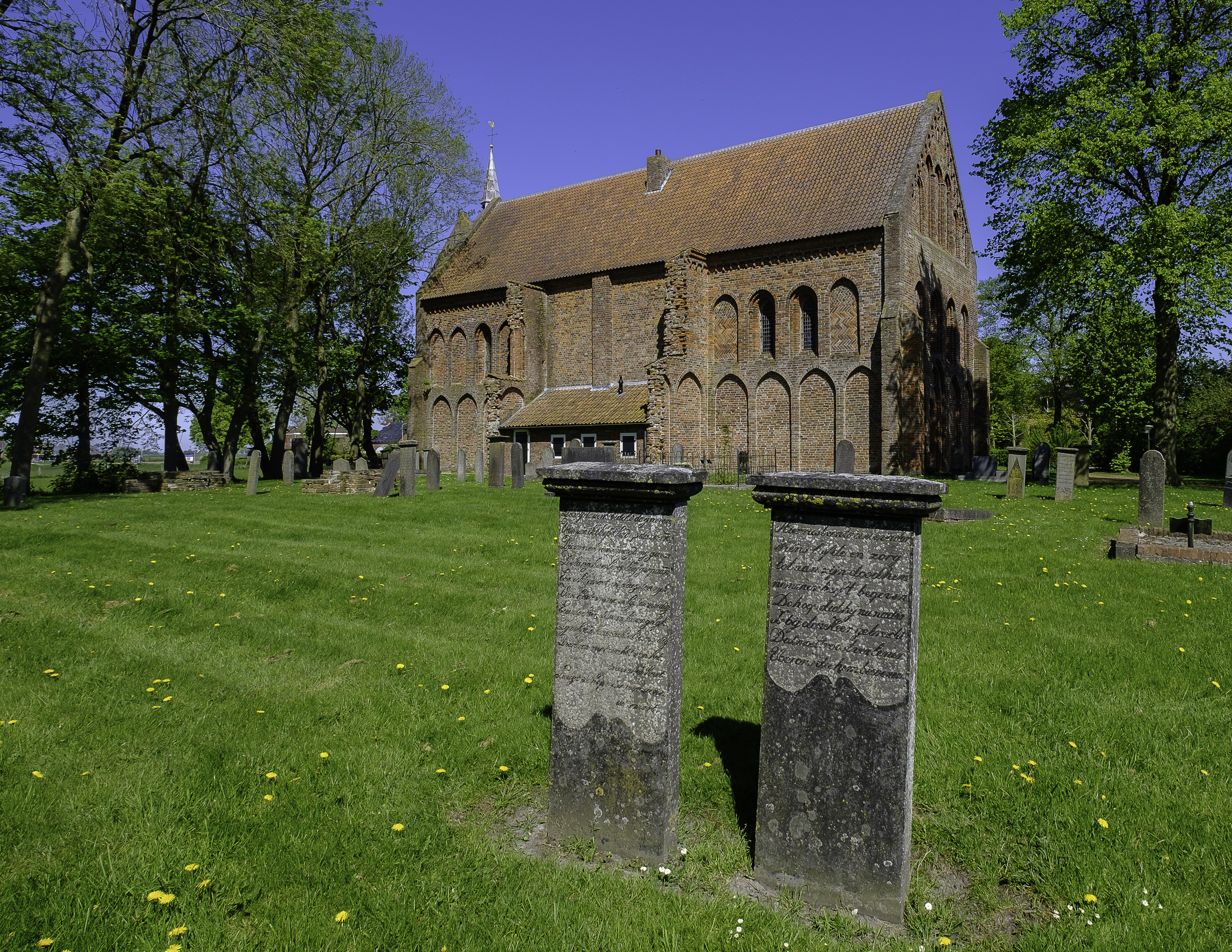
Graveyard of the Church of Garmerwolde
