= Groningen–Assen metropolitan area =

The Groningen–Assen metropolitan area includes the key cities of Groningen (230,000 inhabitants) and Assen (67,000 inhabitants) as well as the surrounding municipalities. Altogether it had over half a million inhabitants in 2018.

The airport of the region is Groningen Airport Eelde.

== The metropolitan region ==
Municipality	Nos. of inhabitants	
Municipality	01-01-2016	31-05-2018
Assen	67,061	67,776
Bedum	10,433	10,438
Groningen	201,200	202,332
Haren	19,076	19,895
Leek	19,536	19,680
Midden-Groningen	n/a	60,953
Noordenveld	31,039	31,353
Ten Boer	7,352	7,275
Tynaarlo	32,804	33,532
Winsum	13,633	13,552
Zuidhorn	18,794	18,921
Total	470,555	505,853
