= Ten Post =

- Village
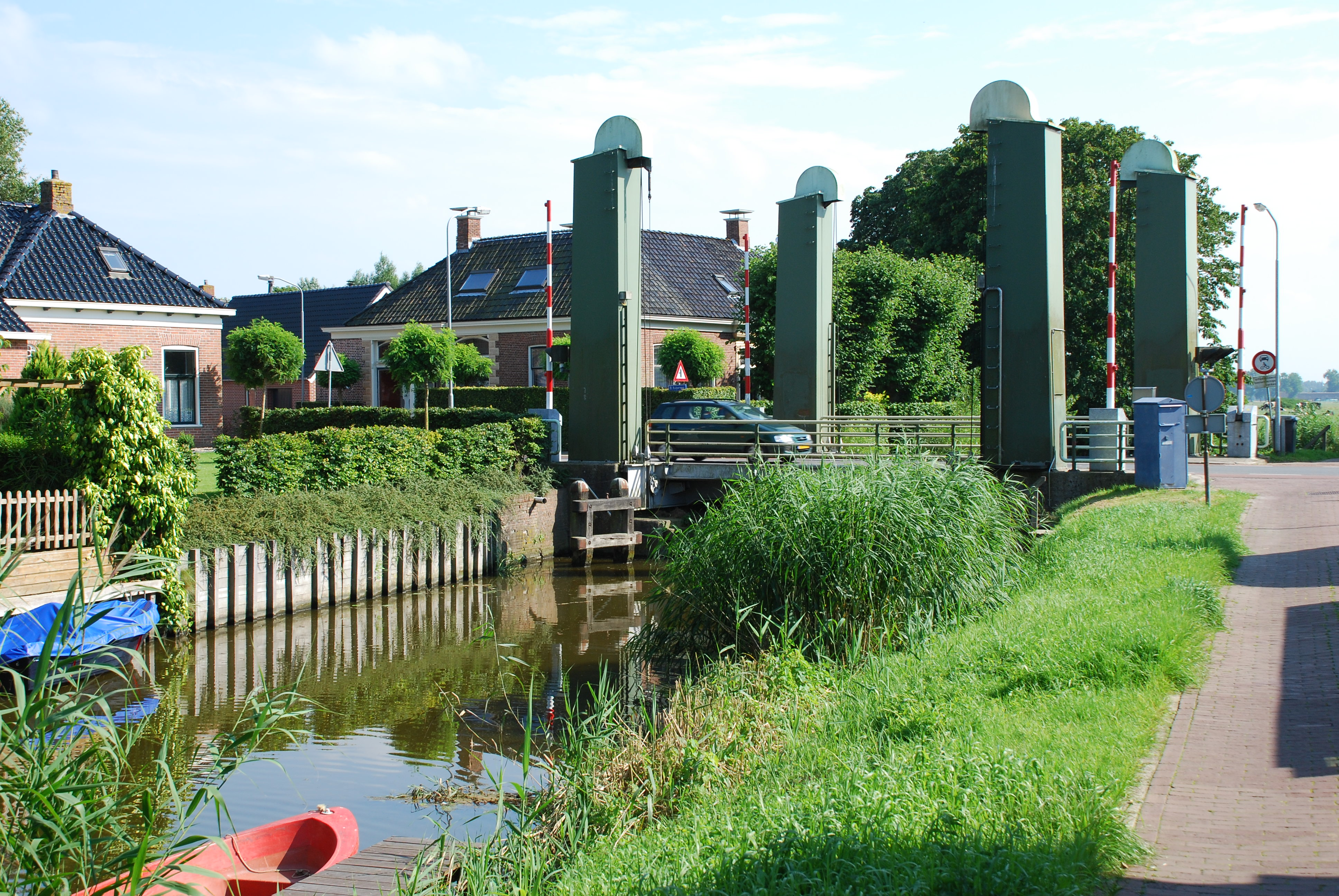
- Vertical-lift bridge of Ten Post

- Flag

- Location in the province of Groningen in the Netherlands Ten Post (Netherlands)
- Coordinates: 53.29699°N 6.72895°E
- Country: Netherlands
- Province: Groningen
- Municipality: Groningen

Area
  - Total: 8.73 km^{2} (3.37 sq mi)
- Elevation: 0.3 m (0.98 ft)

Population (2021)
  - Total: 710
  - Density: 81/km^{2} (210/sq mi)
- Time zone: UTC+1 (CET)
  - Summer (DST): UTC+2 (CEST)
- Postal code: 9792
- Dialing code: 050

Ten Post is a village in the Dutch province of Groningen. It is part of the municipality of Groningen. The village is located along the Damsterdiep and about 14 kilometres (8.7 mi) from Groningen.

== History ==
The village was first mentioned in 1380 as Tenpost, and means "at the simple bridge". Around 1425, the Damsterdiep, a canal from Groningen to Delfzijl, was dug, and Ten Post started to developed at the intersection of the canal and the road from Stedum to Wittewierum.

There used to be three borgs (castles) near Ten Post: Tuwinga, Oldenhuis and Tamminghahuizen. Oldenhuis was built in the mid-14th century and Tuwinga was built nearby in the early 15th century. The owners of the two borgs did not get along and feuded over the ownership of the road along their castles. On several occasions, it escalated into an armed conflict. In 1631, Oldenhuis was bought by Edzard Rengers, the owner of Tuwinga. Oldenhuis was neglected, and demolished in 1715. Tuwinga lasted until 1788.

The Reformed Church was the first church constructed in Ten Post in 1845, and was rebuilt in 1870. The Dutch Reformed church was built in 1870 as a simple building with a ridge turret.

The grist mill Olle Widde (Old White) was built in or before 1812. In 1922, an electro motor was installed. The wind mill remained in operation until around 1967. In 1977, it was sold and restored, however the owner also ran a second-hand car dealership near the wind mill. By 1989, it had deteriorated and was locked into place. In 2009, it was sold to Koning who wanted to open a restaurant near the mill, and in 2011, Olle Widde was back in operation.

Ten Post was home to 228 people in 1840. Around 1935, a vertical-lift bridge over the Damsterdiep. Ten post used to part of the municipality of Ten Boer until 2019 when it was merged into Groningen.

== Gallery ==
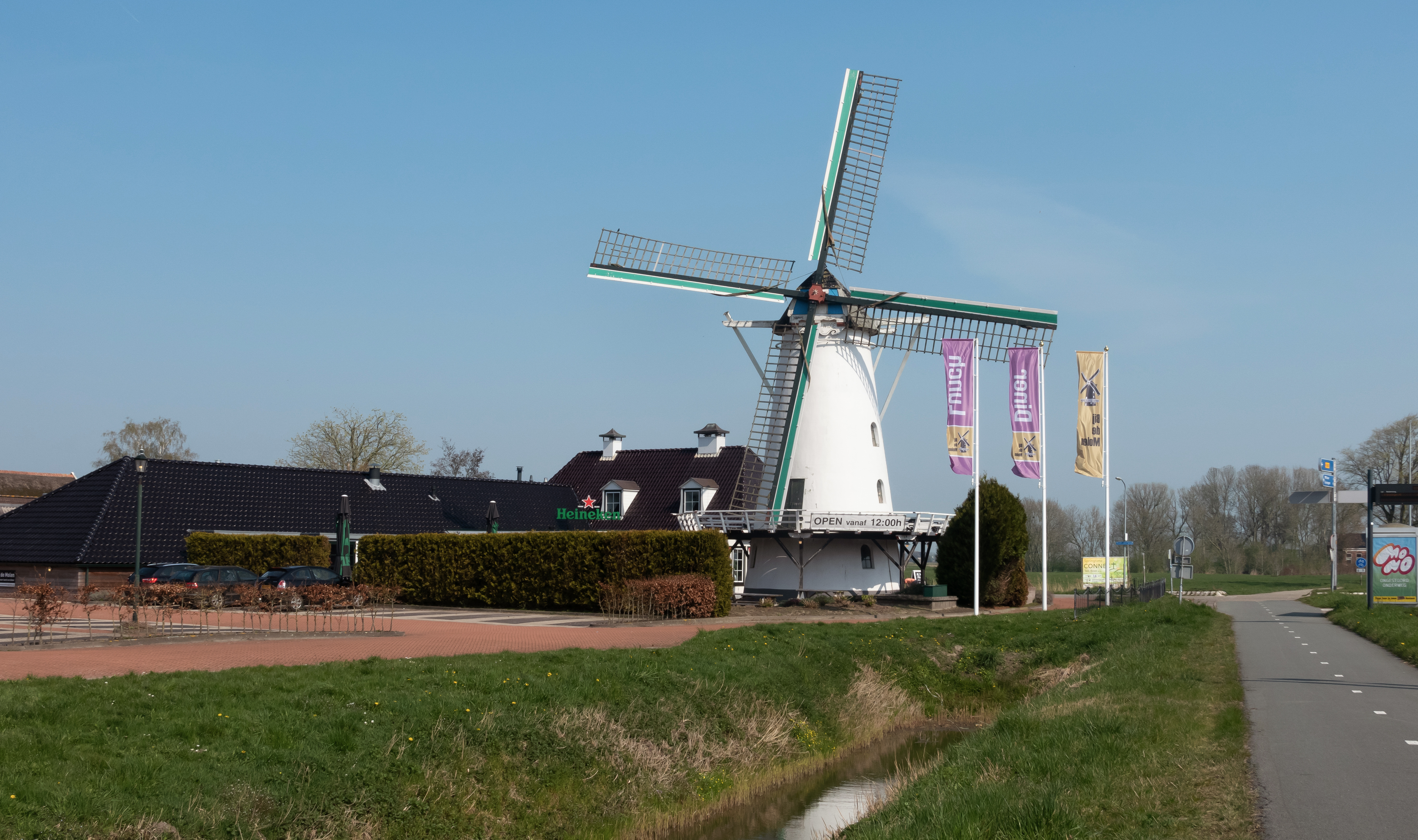
Wind mill De Olle Widde

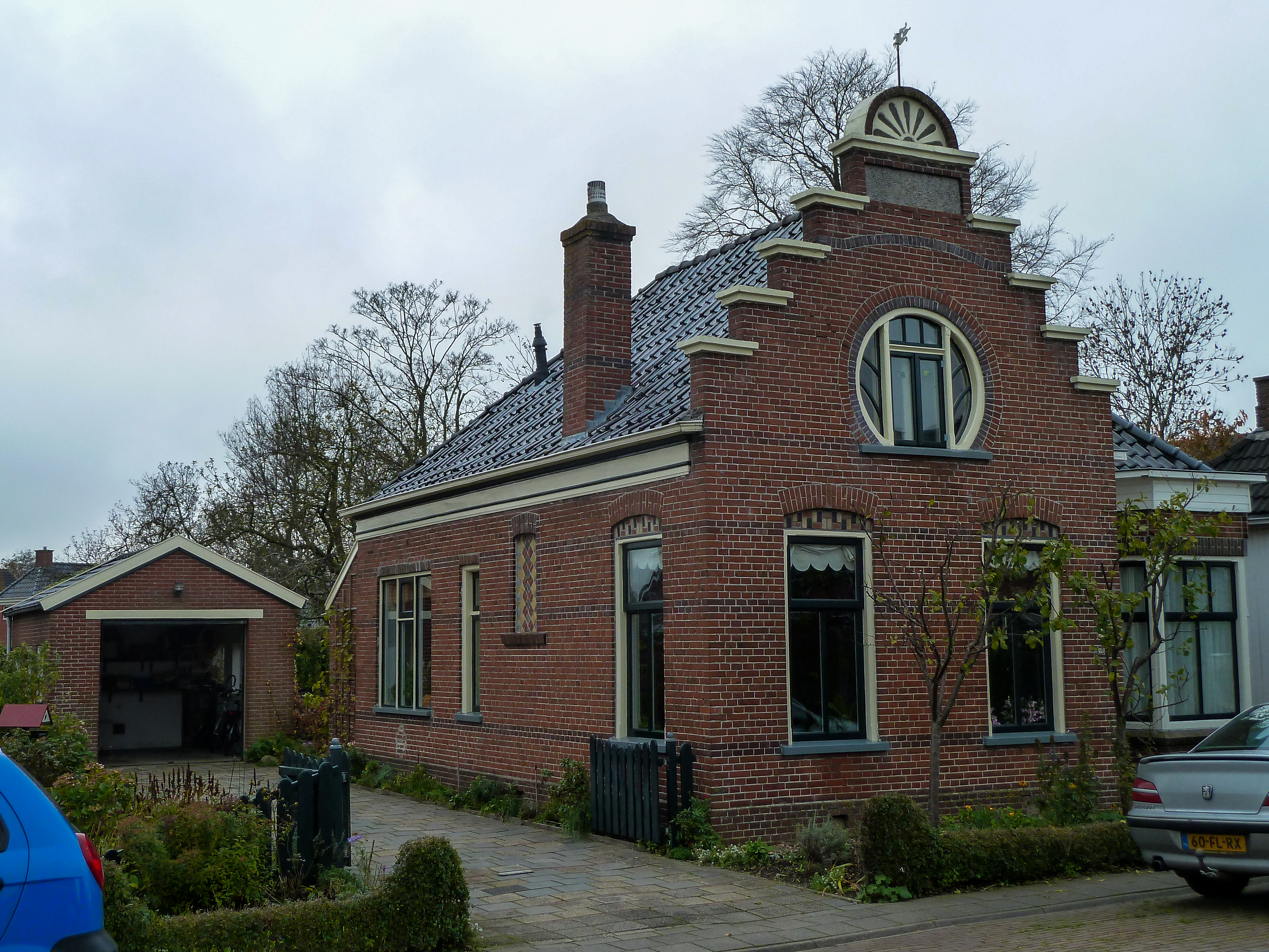
Former shop

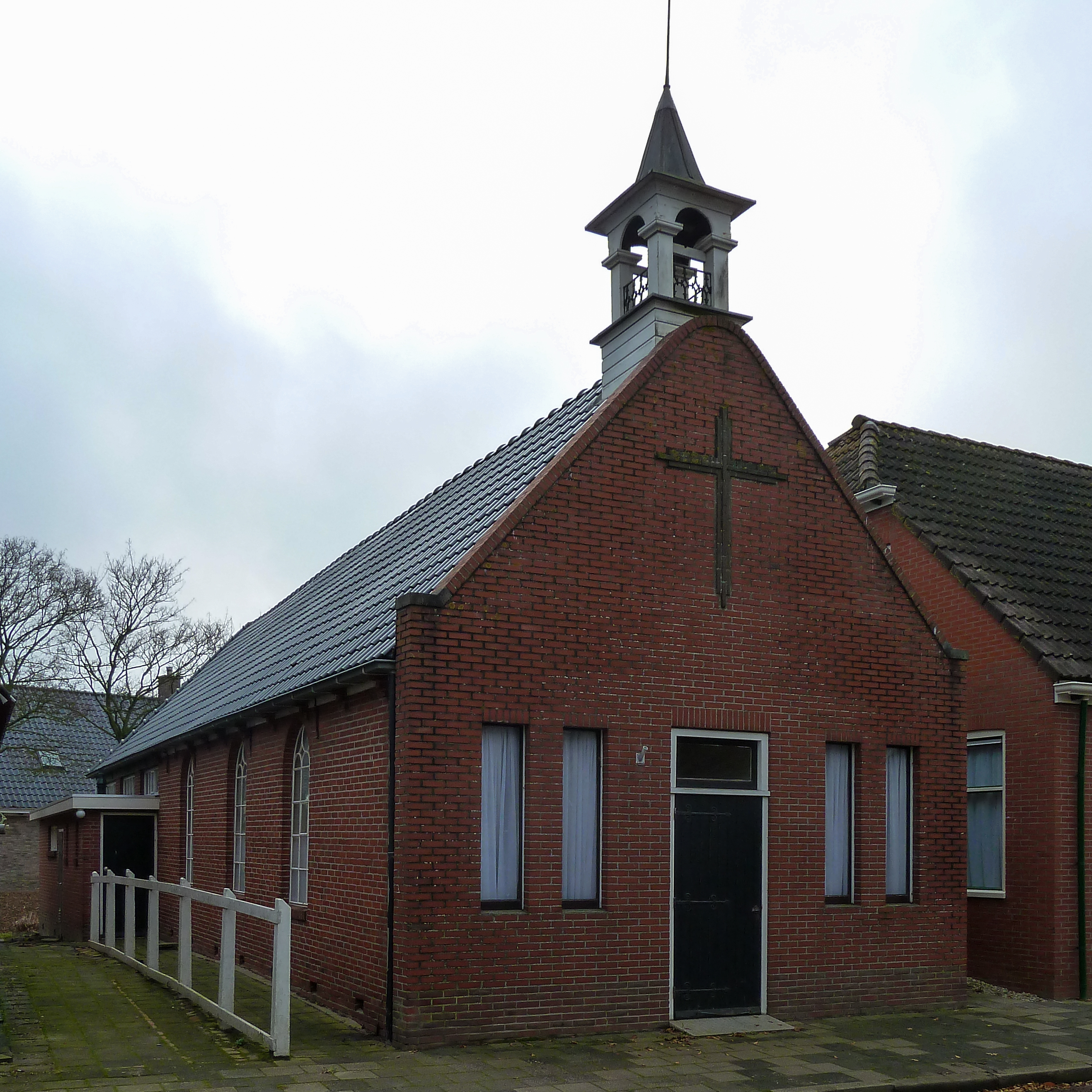
Former Dutch Reformed church

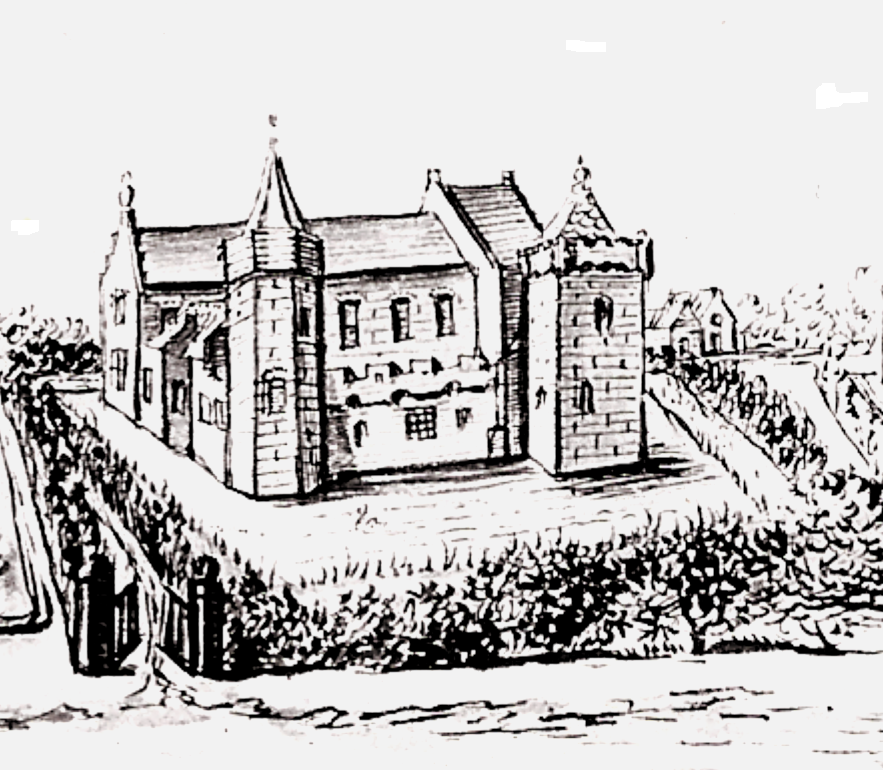
Drawing of Borg Oldenhuis (17th century)
