= Kardingermaar =

Coordinates: 53°24′N 6°37′E

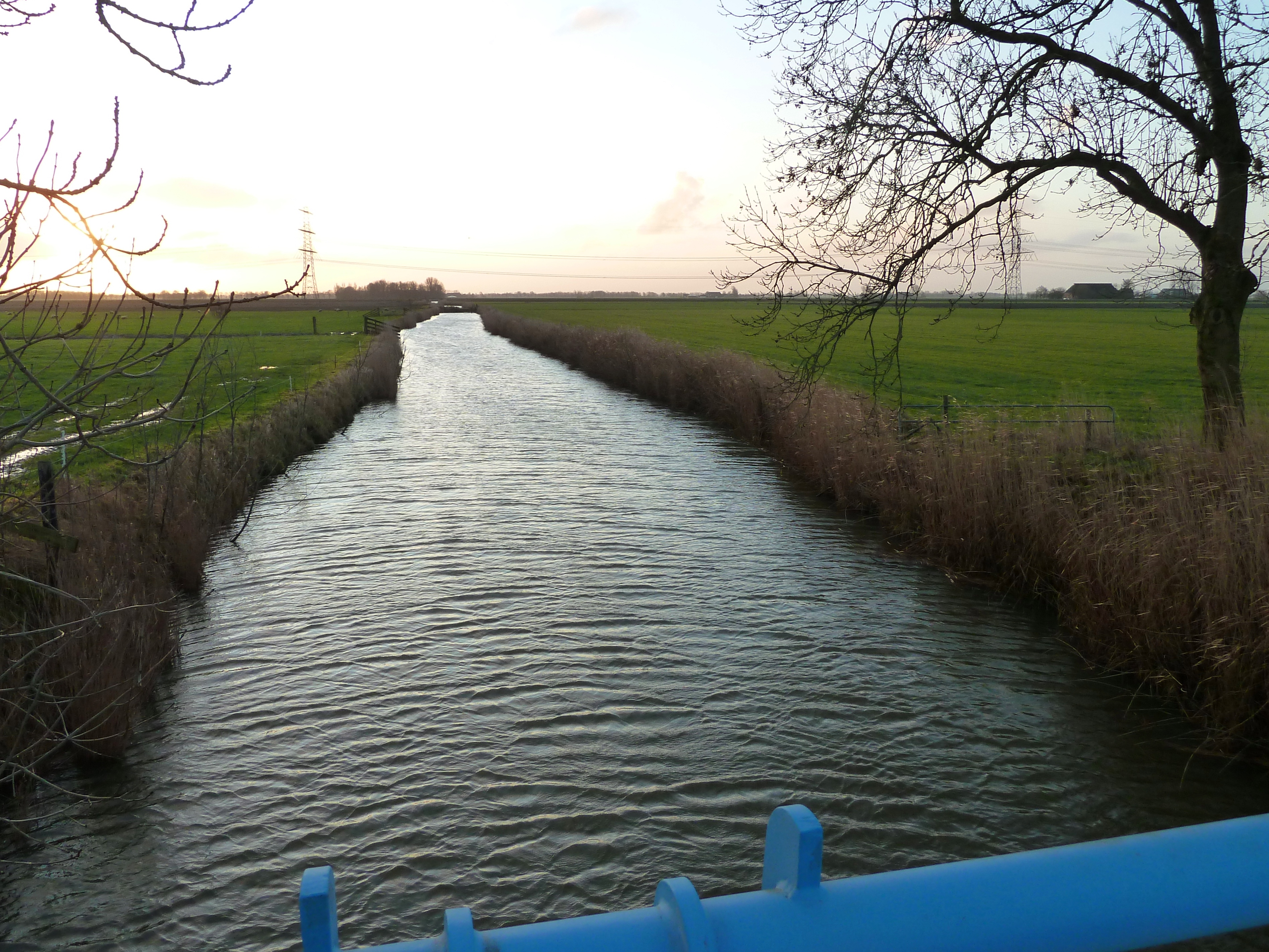
the Kardingermaar as seen from the bridge Keesrieftil between Bedum and Middelstum

The Kardingermaar is a maar (waterway) in the province of Groningen in the Netherlands. It is, for the most part, the border between the municipalities of Bedum and Ten Boer.

== History ==
It once formed the most important drainage of the Vierendeel, the eastern part of the Innersdijken which transported its water to the North, to the Winsumerdiep at Onderdendam. On the eastside there was a portage, named the Rollen which served as a shipping link with the Damsterdiep canal.

The water is named after the Kardingereed. The area west of the village of Sint-Annen.

After a major reconstruction, performed during the mid-1970s, the drainage was drastically improved. The region of the Vierendeel is combined with the area south of Bedum and now drains off through the Harm Westerskanaal and the pumping station Casper Hommes on the Boterdiep just north of Zuidwolde.

At the moment only the part between the railway-route Bedum - Stedum (there is a culvert here) and the Harm Westerskanaal is called the Kardingermaar. The other parts all have different drain directions, and thus are considered separate waterways.

== Structure ==
The part between the Damsterdiep and the Noordermolen is now called the Borgsloot boven de Rollen. The part from the Noordermolen to the Langelandstermolen is now called Abbemaar. The part after that, through the village of Thesinge is called the Thesingermaar and the part to the east of Thesinge is now called Geweide.

The non-drained part, north of the railway tracks is now named the Kardinger Buitenmaar (formerly known as Buitenmaar) and Kromme Kardingermaar (formerly known as Krommaar).

They all preserve their original, local names.
