= Hendrik Nienhuis =

Dutch legal scholar (1790–1862)

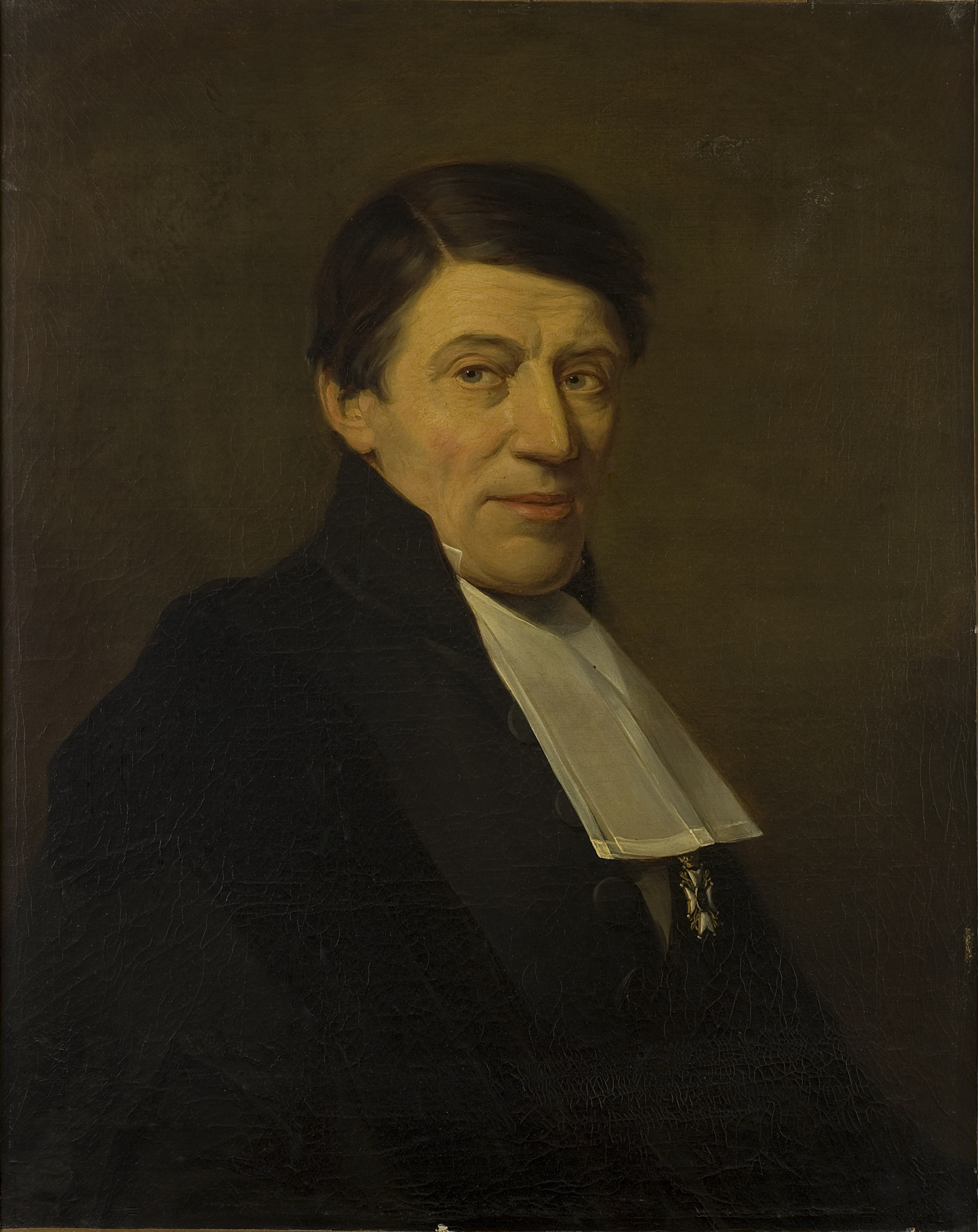
- Portrait of Nienhuis by Jan Ensing

Rector of University of Groningen
- In office 1829–1830
- In office 1845–1844

Personal details
- Born: 12 February 1790 Ten Boer, Netherlands
- Died: 28 November 1862 (aged 72) Groningen, Dutch Republic

Hendrik Nienhuis (12 February 1790 in Ten Boer – 28 November 1862 in Groningen) was a Dutch legal scholar, rector of the University of Groningen in 1829–30 and 1844–45, and a conservative member of the House of Representatives of the Netherlands in 1848, who voted against Johan Rudolph Thorbecke's revision of the Constitution of the Netherlands.
