= Dirk van der Borg =

Dutch politician

D.R. (Dirk) van der Borg (born 3 November 1955 in Thesinge) is a Dutch politician of the Christian Democratic Appeal (CDA).

Van der Borg has been acting mayor of Sliedrecht since 31 March 2020. Previously he was acting mayor of Molenlanden from 2019 to 2020, acting mayor of Molenwaard from 2013 to 2018, and mayor of Graafstroom from 2006 to 2012. Graafstroom became part of the new municipality of Molenwaard on 1 January 2013, and Molenwaard of the new municipality of Molenlanden on 1 January 2019.

Van der Borg started his career as a civil servant. He was town clerk of Lopik, Rijssen, and Rijssen-Holten.
