= Ten Boer =

- Village, former municipality
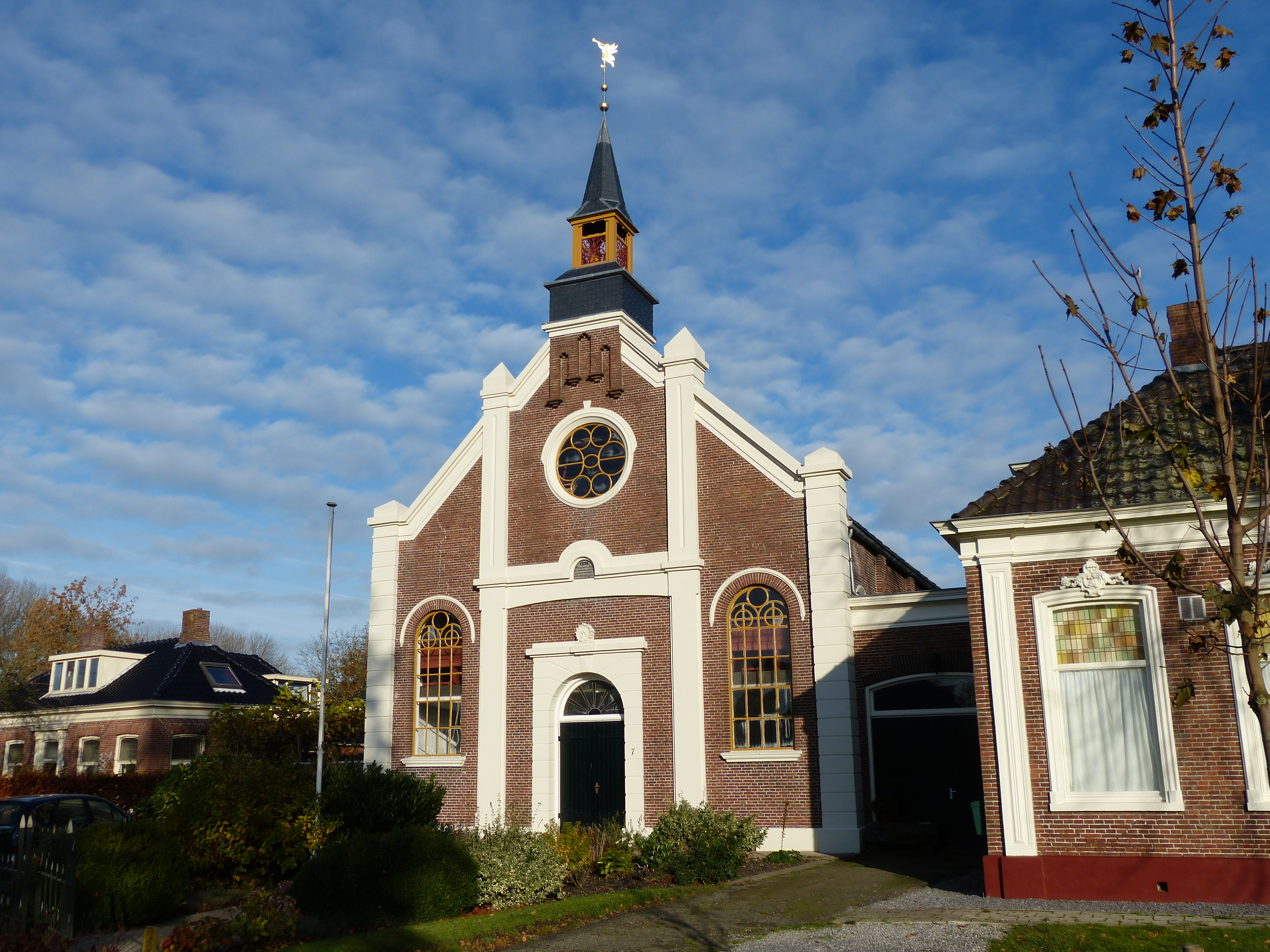
- Church in Thesinge

- Flag Coat of arms

- Location in Groningen

- Location in the province of Groningen in the Netherlands Ten Boer (Netherlands)
- Coordinates: 53.27696°N 6.69432°E
- Country: Netherlands
- Province: Groningen
- Municipality: Groningen
- Merged: 2019

Area
  - Total: 9.06 km^{2} (3.50 sq mi)
- Elevation: 1 m (3.3 ft)

Population (2021)
  - Total: 4,645
  - Density: 513/km^{2} (1,330/sq mi)
- Time zone: UTC+1 (CET)
  - Summer (DST): UTC+2 (CEST)
- Postcode: 9791
- Area code: 050

Ten Boer (Dutch pronunciation: [tɛmˈbuːr]) is a village and a former municipality in the northeastern Netherlands, in the province of Groningen. The municipality had a population of data missing in 2021; the village of Ten Boer has approximately 4,600 inhabitants. In 2019, it was merged into municipality of Groningen.

== History ==
The village was first mentioned in 1301 as "conventum de Bure", and means "near the house". Ten Boer is a terp (artificial living hill) village on a grid structure. In 1301, a Benedictine monastery for nuns was established in Ten Boer. In 1485, it was incorporated into the monastery of Thesinge. Around 1425, the Damsterdiep, a canal from Groningen to Delfzijl, was dug and the village received its current shape.

The Dutch Reformed church is the former monastery church, and dates from the 13th century. The church was modified in 1565. The tower was demolished around 1800, and in 1810, a ridge turret was placed on the roof instead.

Ten Boer was home to 279 people in 1840. The former town hall is an L-shaped building with tower from 1911. It was influenced by Berlage and Jugendstil. Ten Boer was an independent municipality until 2019 when it was merged into Groningen.

== Former population centres ==
Garmerwolde, Lellens, Sint Annen, Ten Boer, Ten Post, Thesinge, Winneweer, Wittewierum and Woltersum.

== Notable people from Ten Boer ==
- Dirk van der Borg (born 1955), mayor of Graafstroom and Molenwaard
- Paul Drewes (born 1982), Olympic rower
- Hendrik Nienhuis (1790-1862), jurist and parliament member
- Remco van der Schaaf (born 1979), football player

== Gallery ==
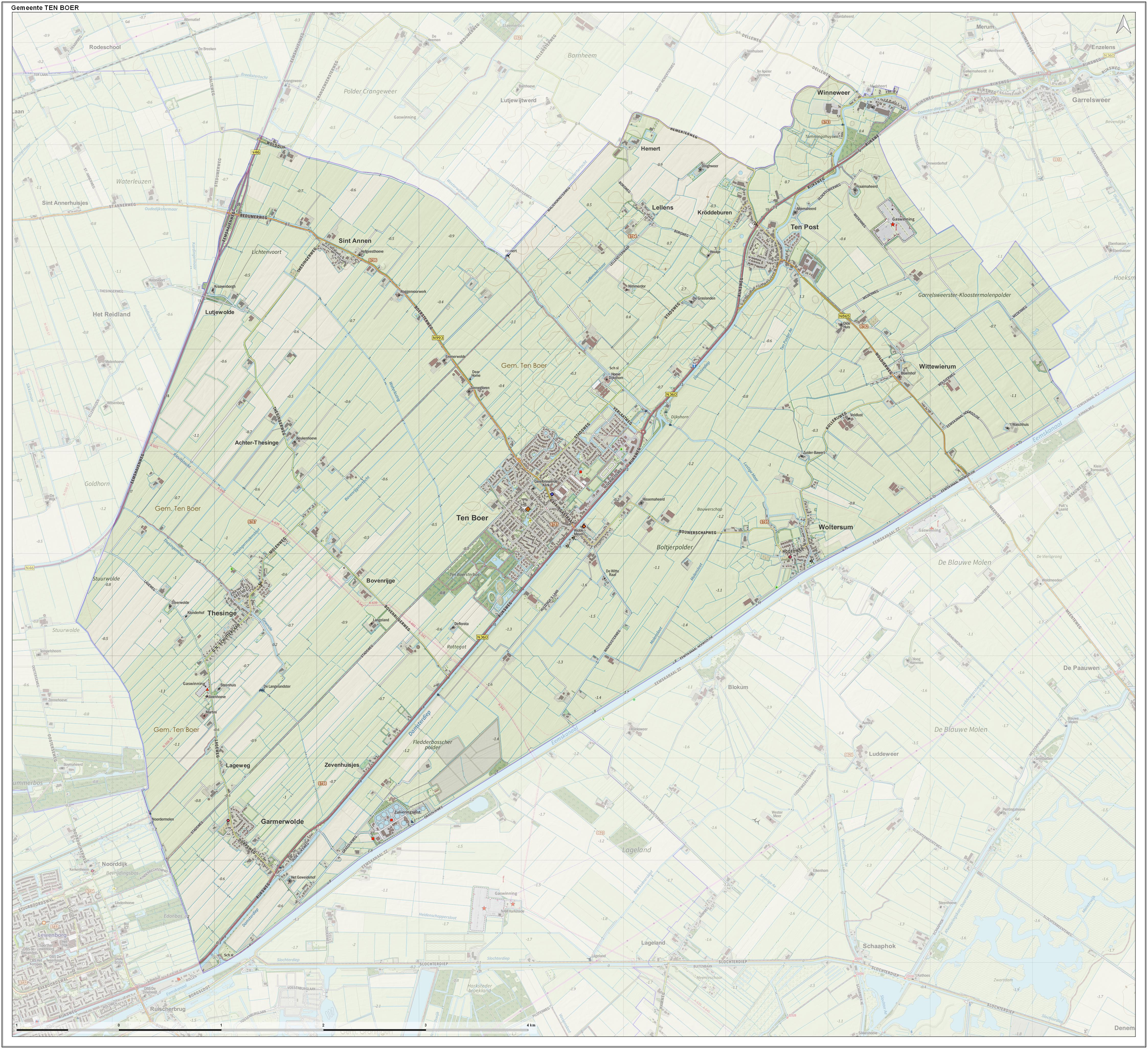
Dutch topographic map of the municipality of Ten Boer, June 2015

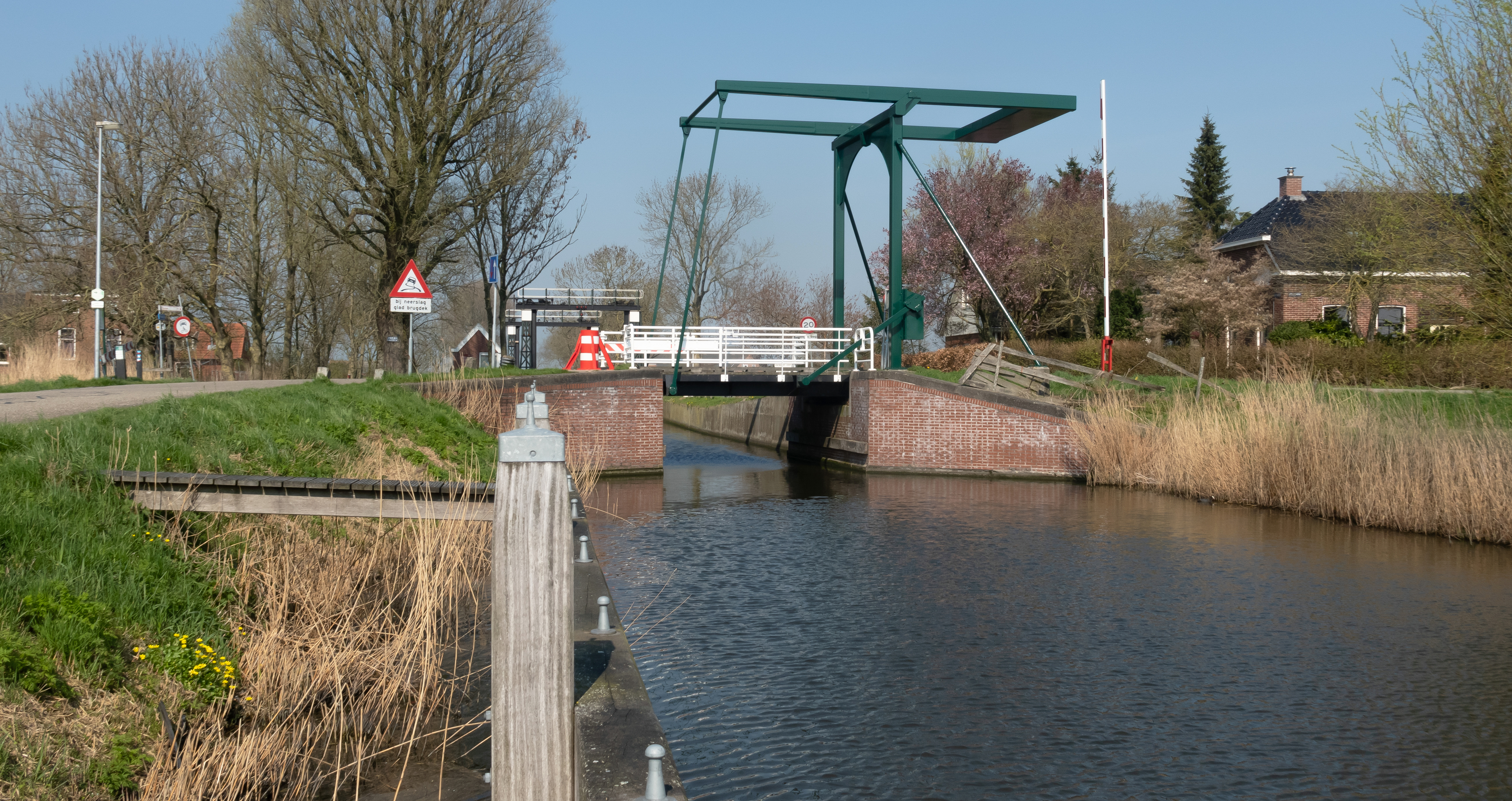
Drawing bridge near the Wolddijk-Stadsweg

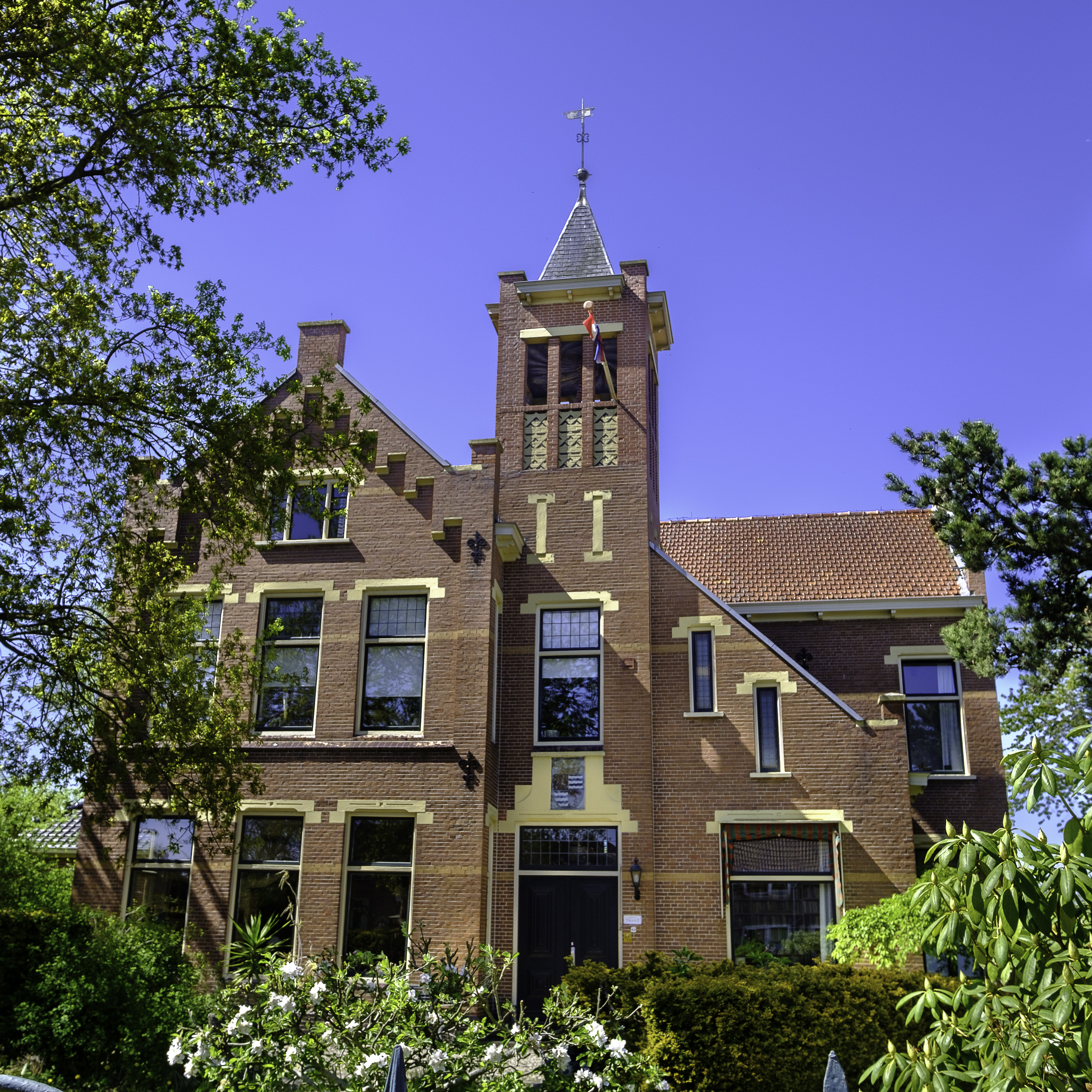
Former town hall

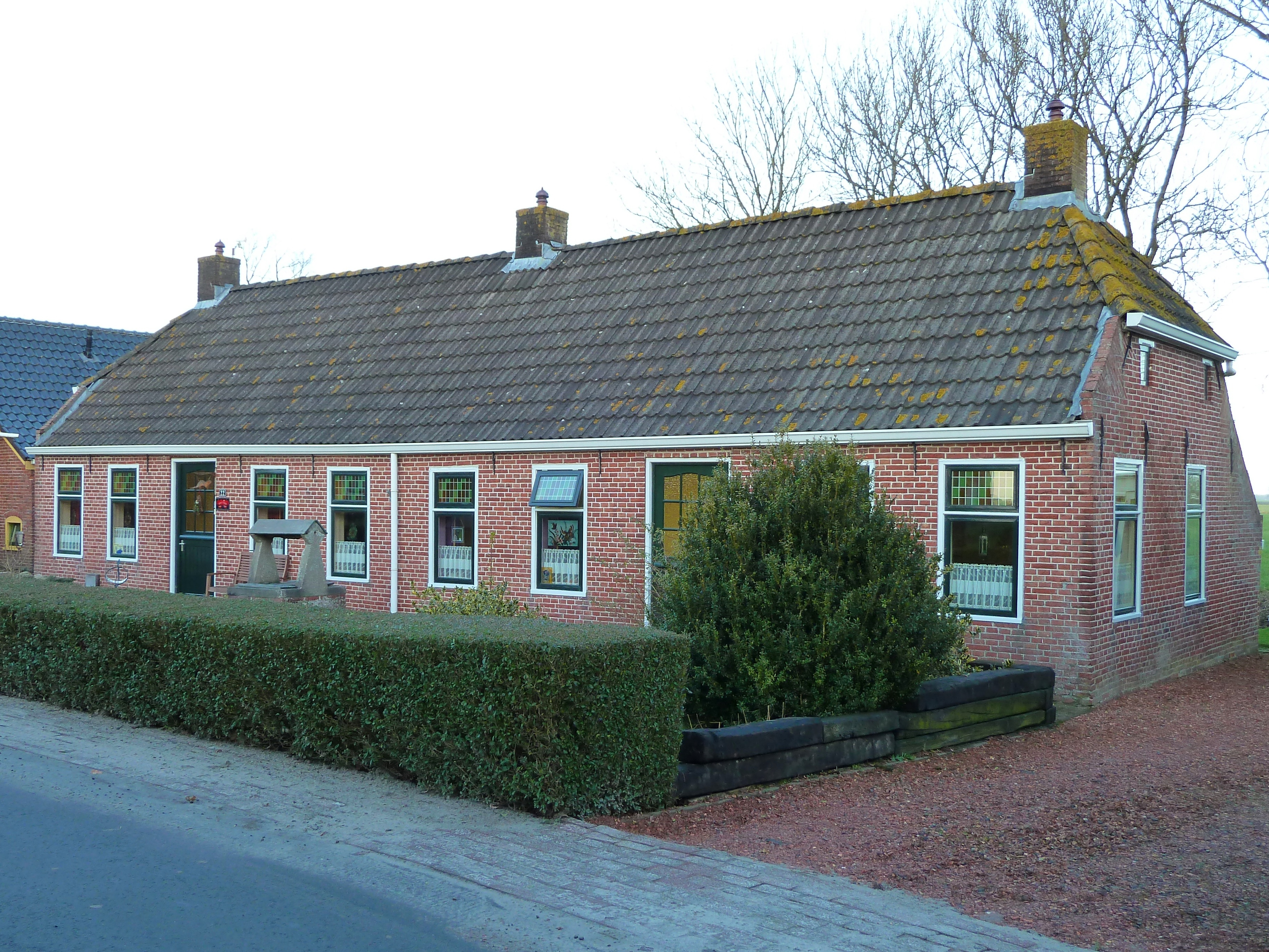
Poorhouse
