= Noorddijk, Groningen =

Noorddijk
- Village
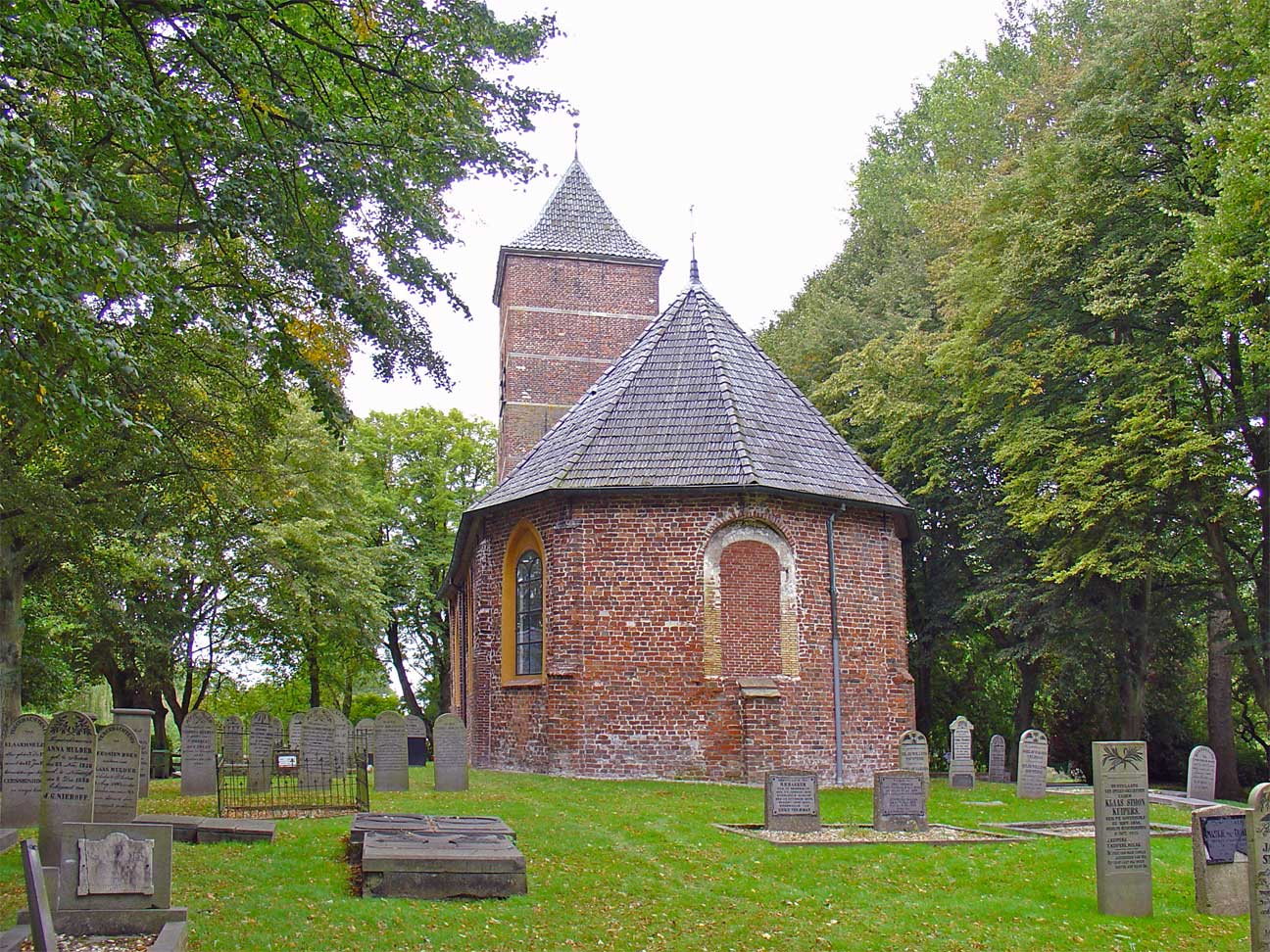
- Stephanuskerk at Noorddijk

- Location of Noorddijk in Groningen in the Netherlands Noorddijk (Netherlands)
- Coordinates: 53°14′42″N 6°37′35″E
- Country: Netherlands
- Province: Groningen
- Municipality: Groningen

Area
  - Total: 2.24 km^{2} (0.86 sq mi)
- Elevation: −0.6 m (−2.0 ft)

Population (2021)
  - Total: 95
  - Density: 42/km^{2} (110/sq mi)
- Time zone: UTC+1 (CET)
  - Summer (DST): UTC+2 (CEST)
- Postal code: 9734
- Dialing code: 0596

Noorddijk is a village in the Dutch province of Groningen. It is located in the municipality of Groningen, about 5 km northeast of the city centre.

Noorddijk was a separate municipality until 1969, when it was merged with the city of Groningen.

== History ==
The village was first mentioned in 1299 as "de Northdic", and means northern dike. North is relative to the city of Groningen. Noorddijk dates in the Early Middle Ages when the raised bog of the Hunze estuary was being cultivated, and Noorddijk became a linear road village on the dike.

The nave of the Dutch Reformed church dates from around 1250. The church was enlarged around 1550, and the tower was constructed in 1648. The polder mill Noordermolen was built in 1888. In 1963, an electro motor was installed in the wind mill. It was restored in 1980.

Noorddijk was an independent municipality, however the town hall was located in Ruischerbrug. The village was home to 199 people in 1840.

In 1969, Noorddijk was merged into the municipality of Groningen, and the neighbourhood Lewenborg was built to the south-west side. The village of Oosterhoogebrug was annexed, and is nowadays a neighbourhood of Groningen. Even though Noorddijk remained a separate village, the postal authorities have placed it under Groningen, and its small population is added to the total of the city.

== Gallery ==
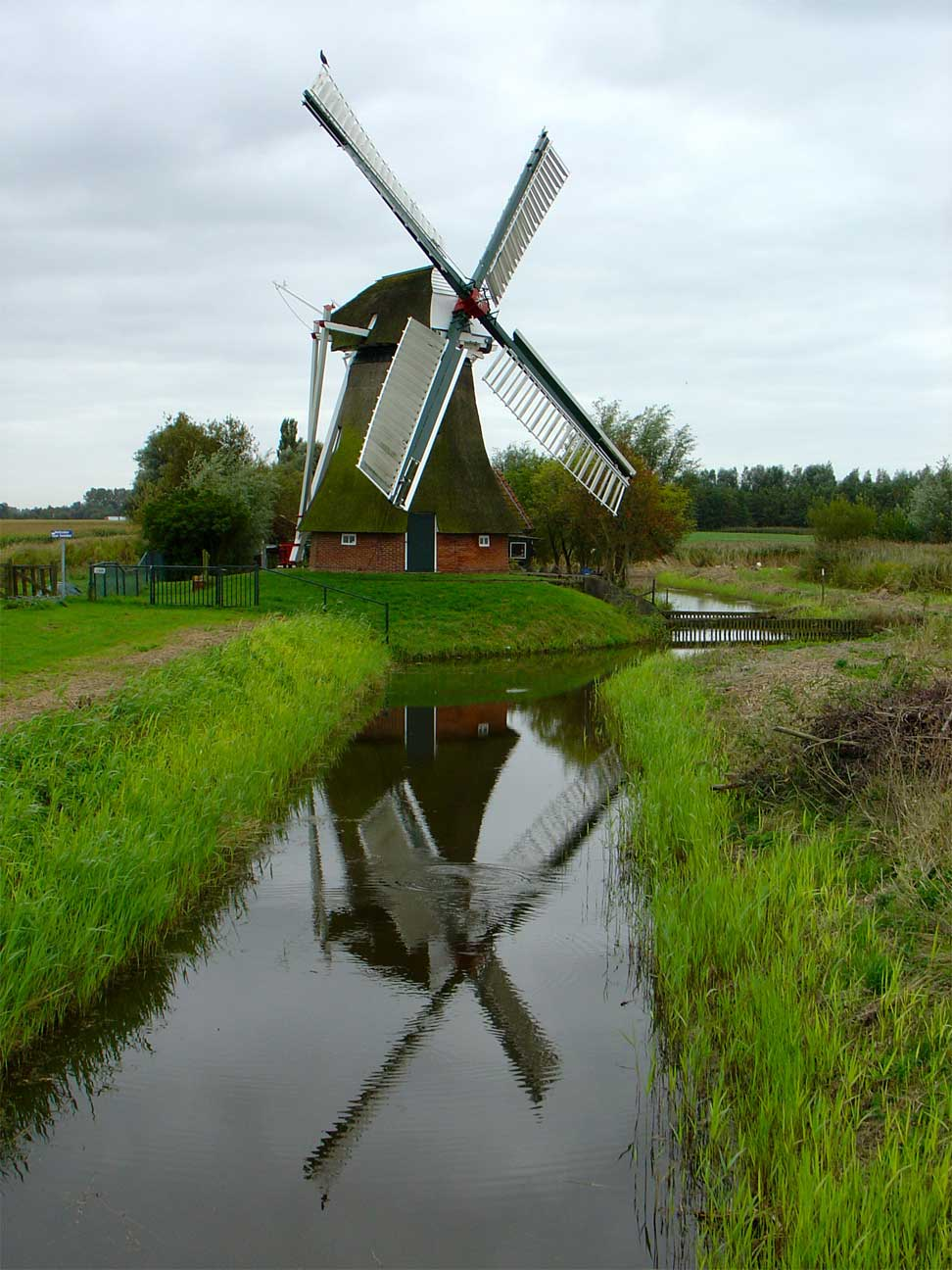
Windmill Noordermolen

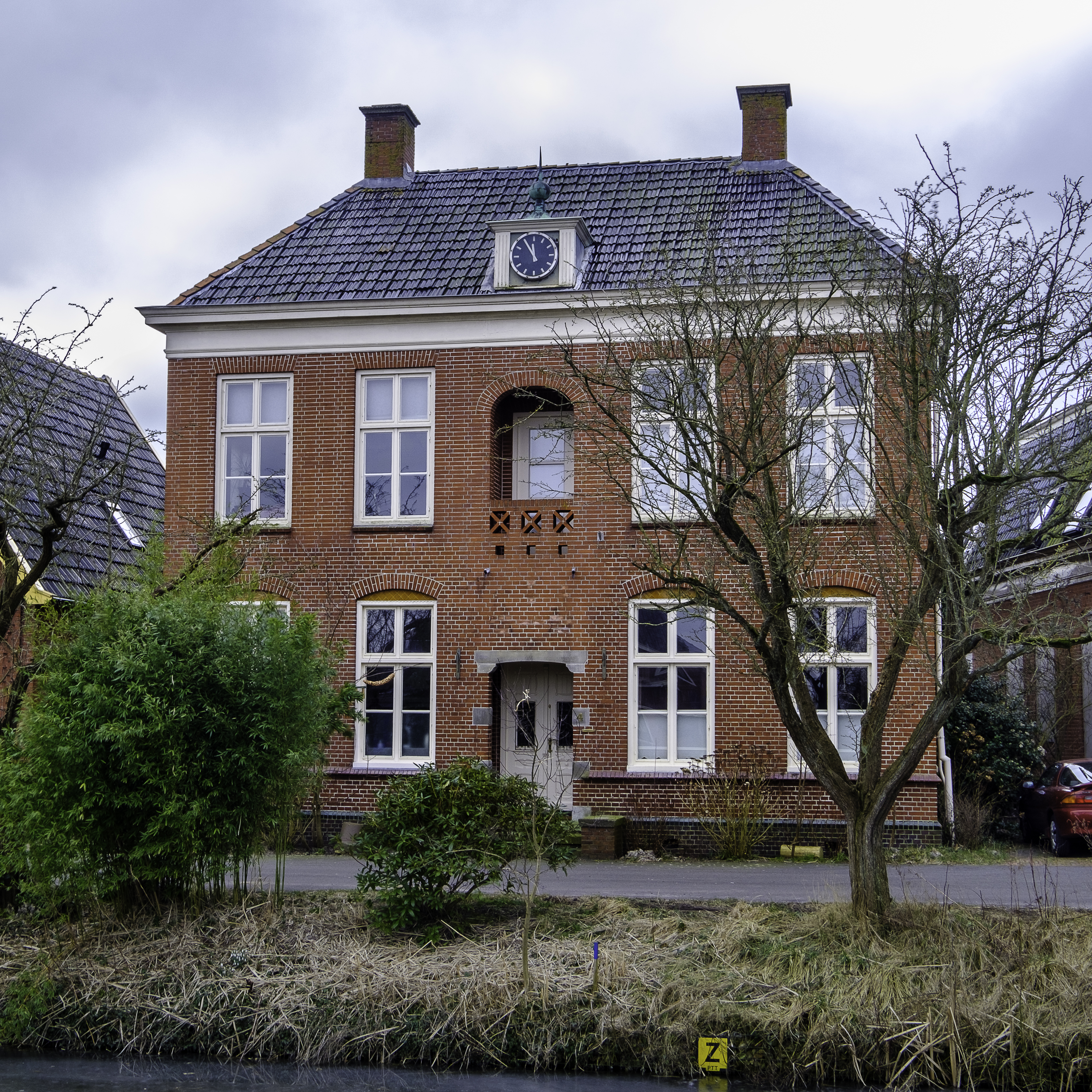
Former town hall

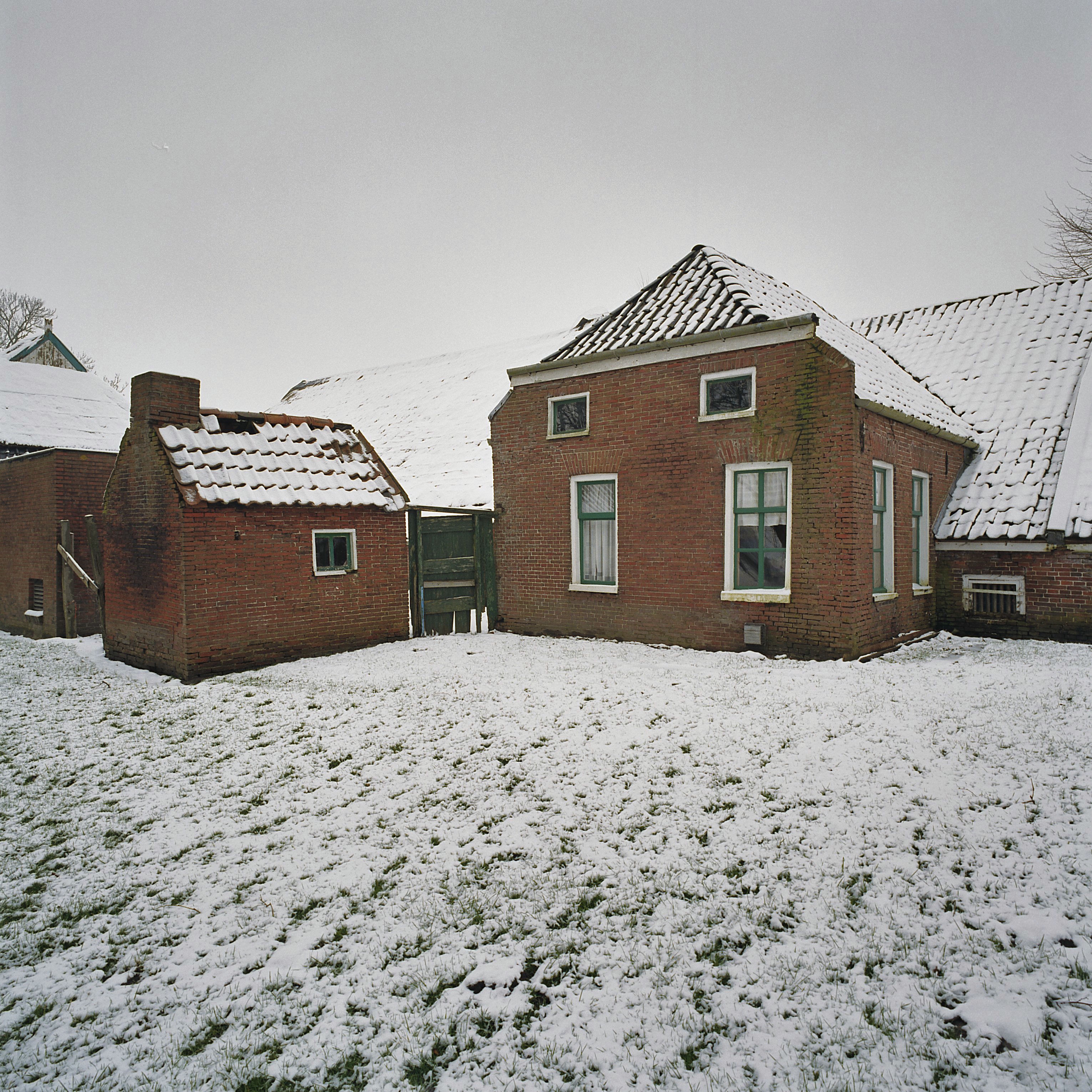
Farm in winter

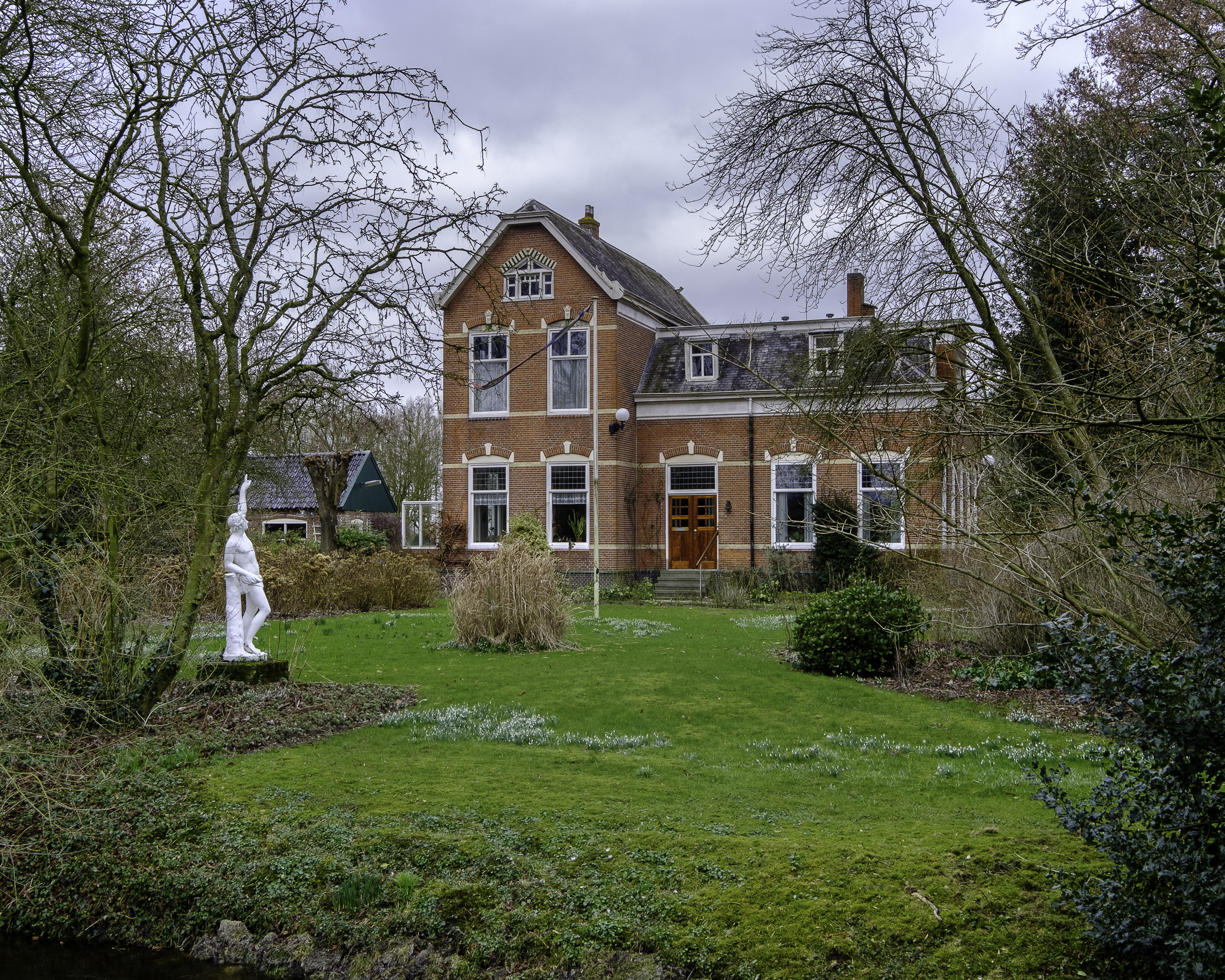
House in Noorddijk
