= Thesinge =

- Village
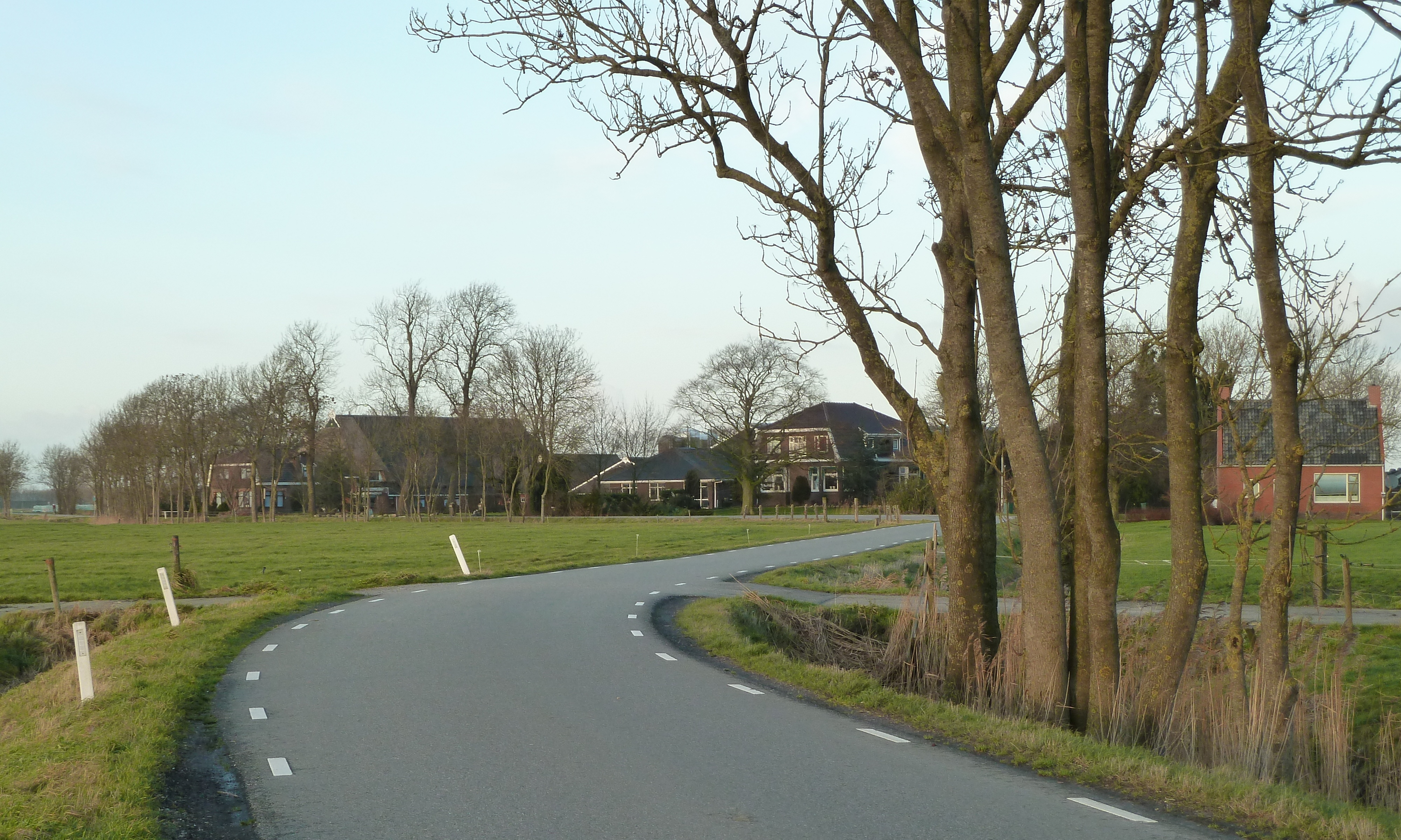
- Thesinge in 2011

- Flag

- Location of Thesinge in the province of Groningen Thesinge (Netherlands)
- Coordinates: 53°16′6″N 6°39′1″E
- Country: Netherlands
- Province: Groningen
- Municipality: Groningen

Area
  - Total: 10.13 km^{2} (3.91 sq mi)
- Elevation: −0.9 m (−3.0 ft)

Population (2021)
  - Total: 550
  - Density: 54/km^{2} (140/sq mi)
- Time zone: UTC+1 (CET)
  - Summer (DST): UTC+2 (CEST)
- Postal code: 9797
- Dialing code: 050

Thesinge (Gronings: Taisen) is a village in the municipality of Groningen, in the Dutch province of Groningen.

The Benedictine monastery of Germania was founded in Thesinge in 1205.

== History ==
The village was first mentioned in 786 or 787 as Thelingi, and means "(monastery) of the people of Thiasa (person)". The Benedictine monastery Germania was founded in 1205 near the village. Thesinge is a terp (artificial living hill) village with a rectangular structure. The monastery was destroyed in 1584 during the Reformation. Most of the buildings were demolished 1629 except for the church.

The St Felicitas Church of the monastery became the Dutch Reformed church. It was built in the 13th century, but extensively modified and rebuilt in 1786. The church was restored between 1972 and 1973. It was decommissioned in 1971, and is used to weddings.

The grist mill Germania was built in 1825, however a wind mill had been at the location before 1649. It was originally a post mill, but converted into a tower mill in 1852. In 1950, an electro motor was installed and the sails were removed. In 1968, it was sold to the municipality of Ten Boer and restored in 1973.

Thesinge was home to 208 people in 1840. In 1999, the forge museum Smidshouk opened. Thesinge used to be part of the municipality of Ten Boer, but become part of Groningen in 2019.

== Notable people ==
- Dirk van der Borg (born 1955), mayor of Sliedrecht

== Gallery ==
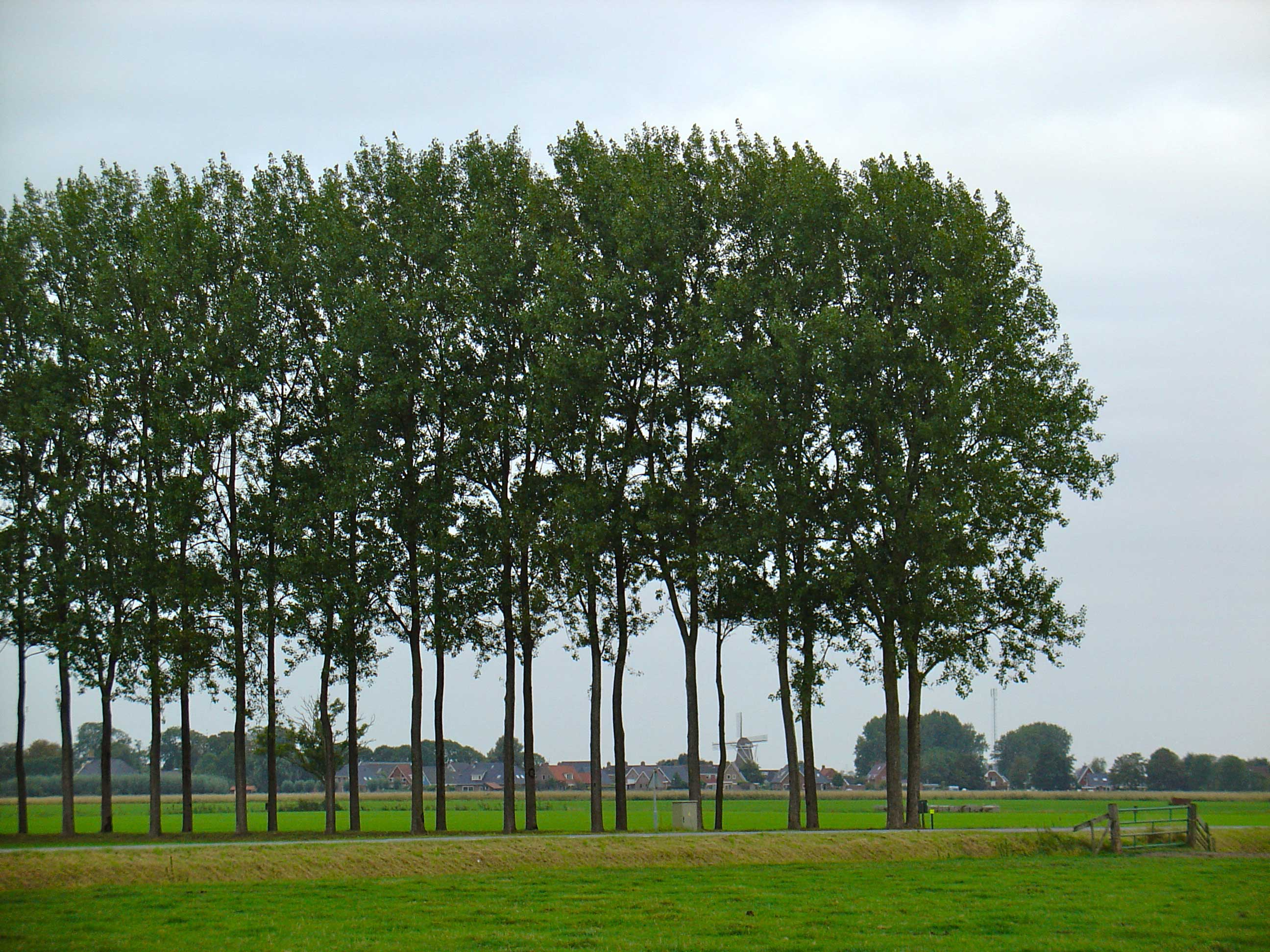
View of Thesinge and surrounding landscape

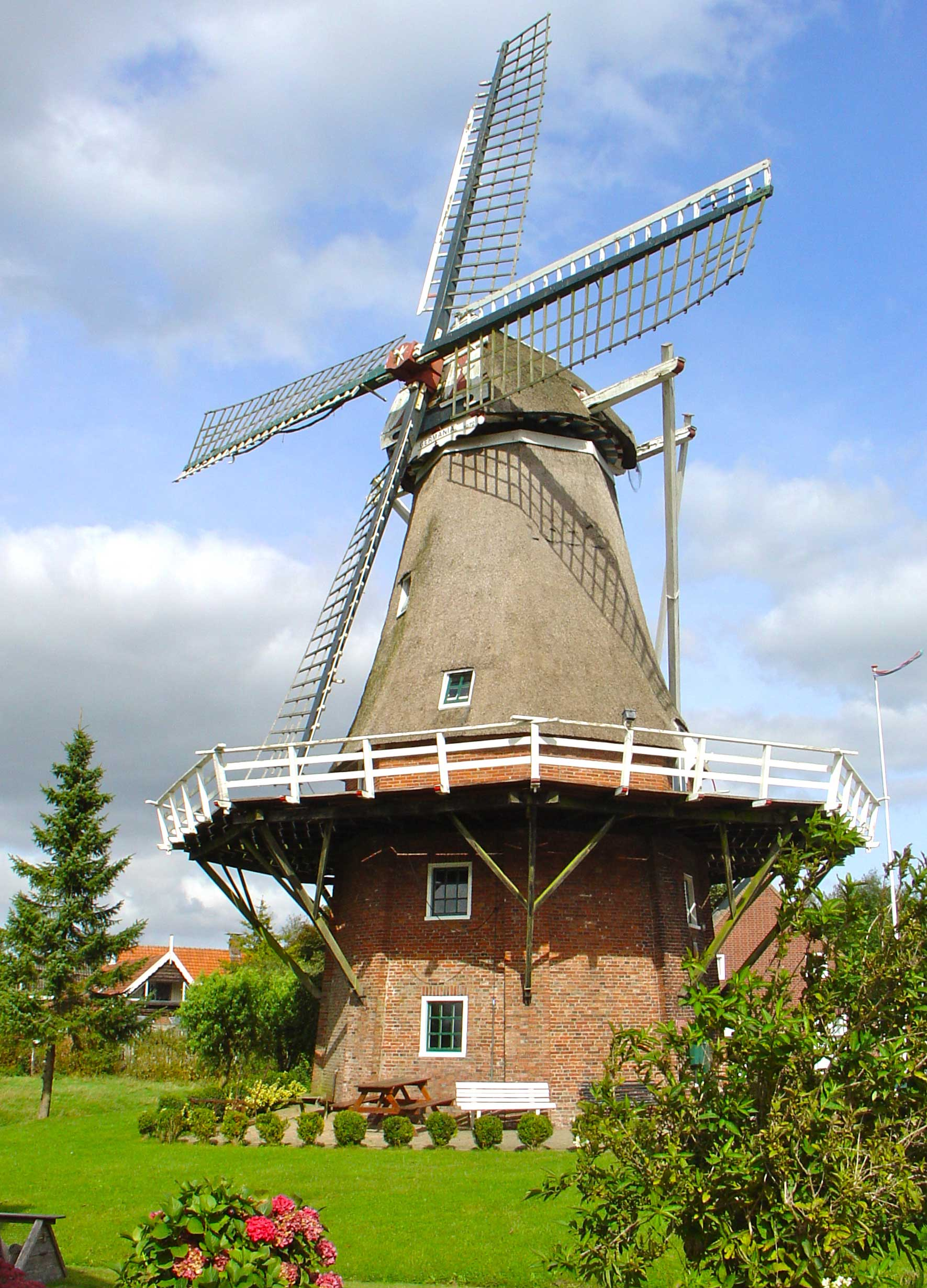
Gristmill Germania

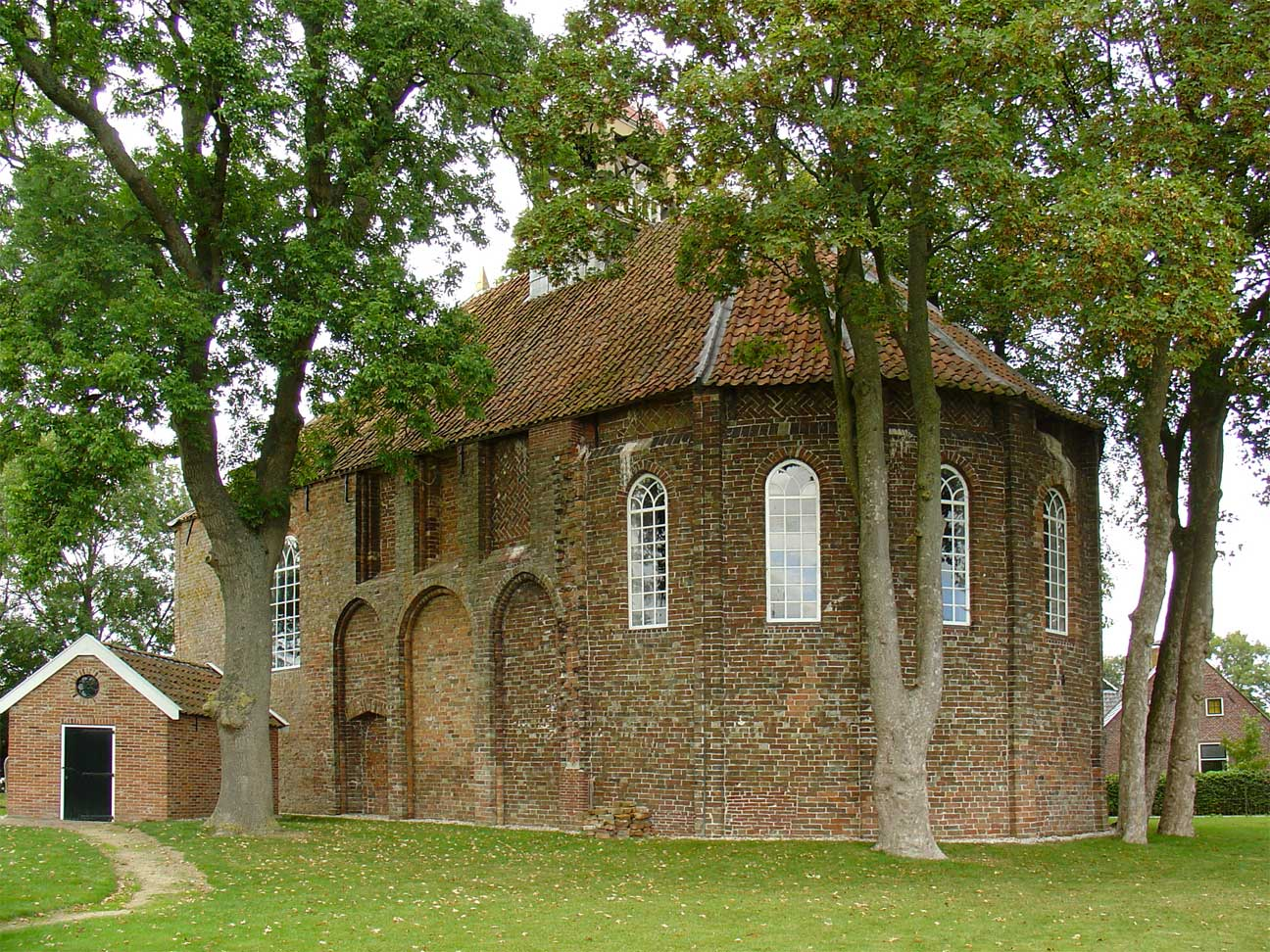
Dutch Reformed church

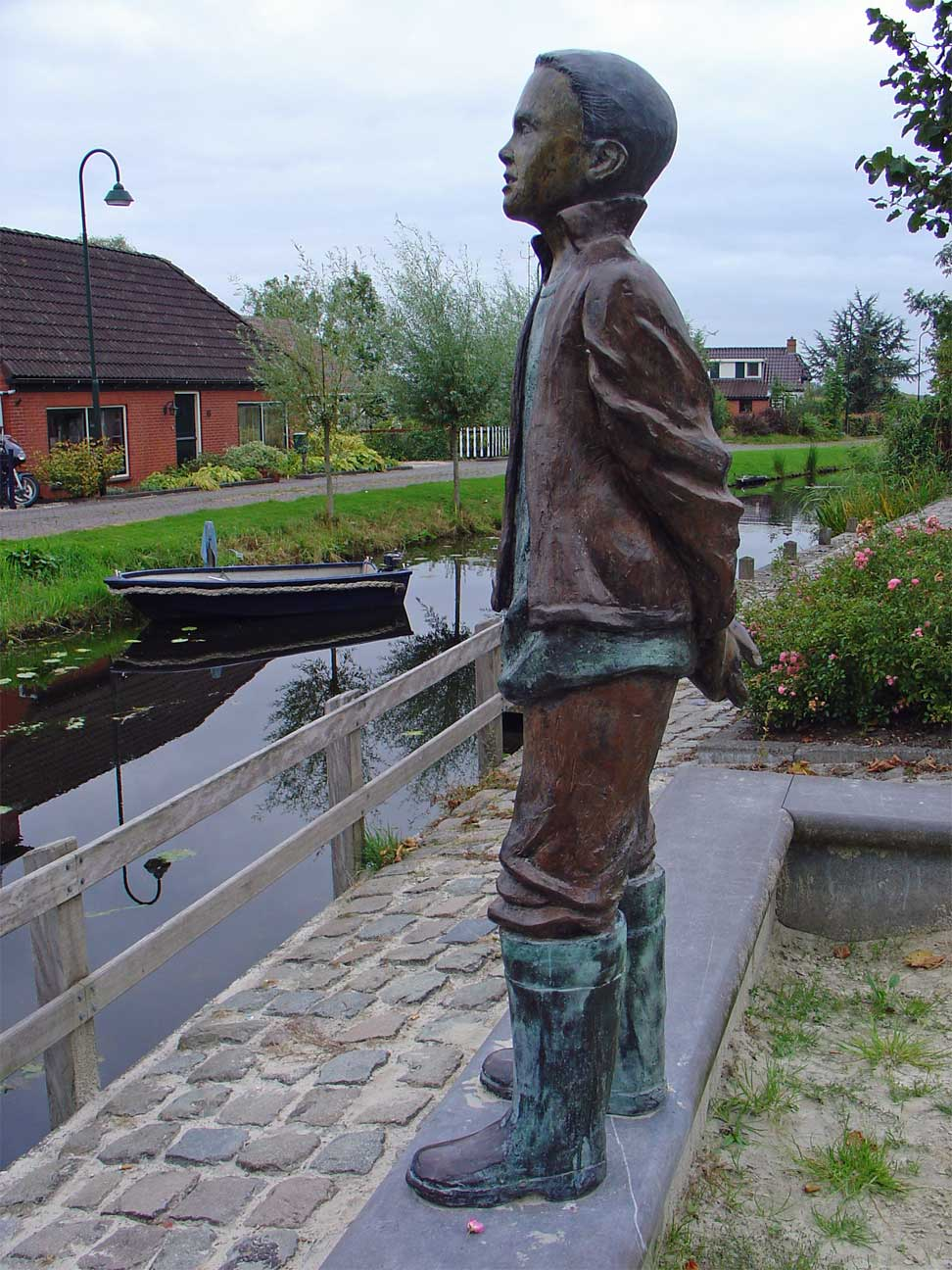
Statue by Gert Sennema
