= Dalem =

Dalem may refer to:

- Dalem, Netherlands, a village in the municipality of Gorinchem
- Dalem, Moselle, a commune of the Moselle department in France
- Dalem (Raja), a royal title on Bali

== See also ==
- Dahlem (disambiguation)
- Dalum (disambiguation)
