= Alblasserwaard =

Polder in the Netherlands

Coordinates: 51°52′24″N 4°48′3″E

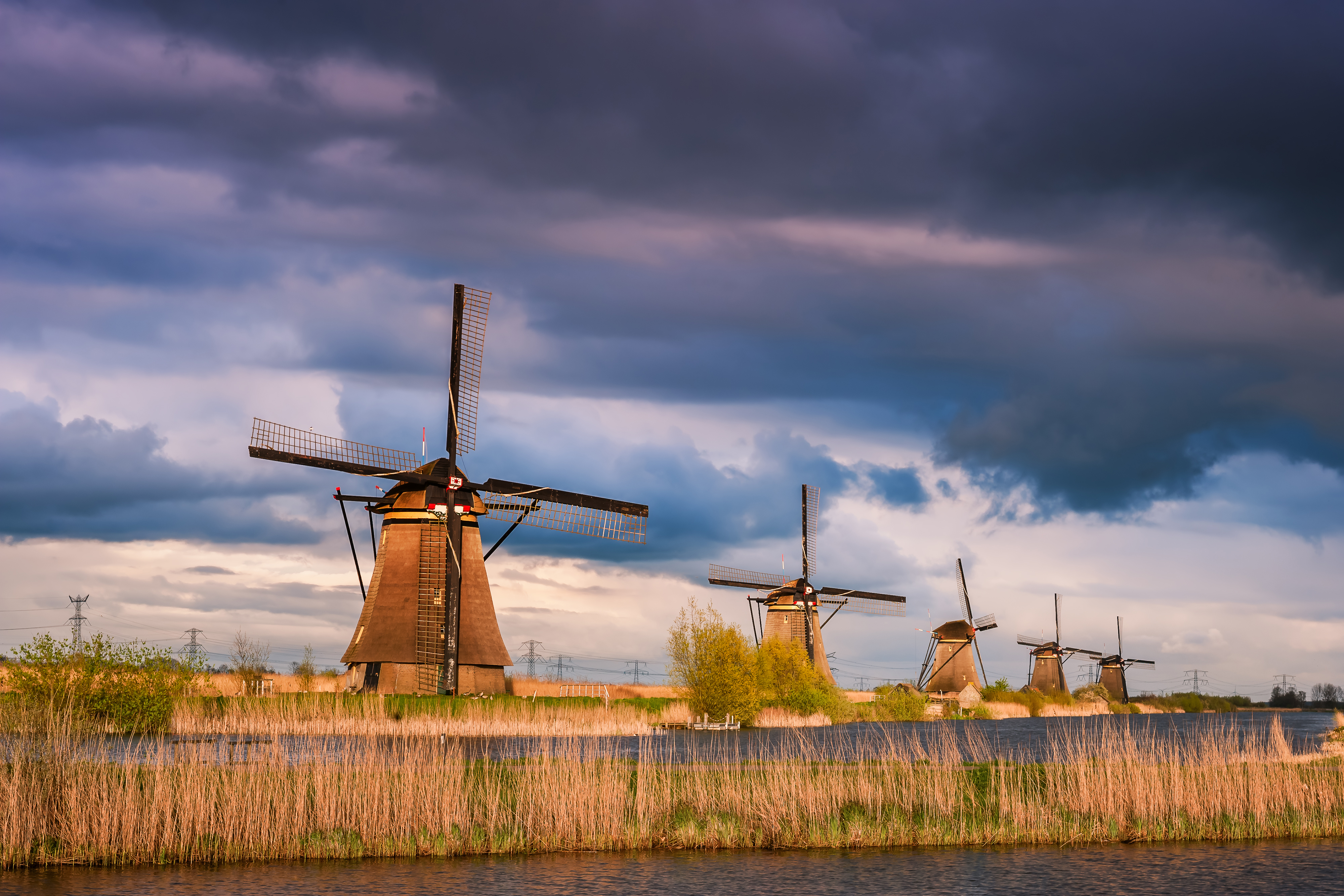
Windmills at Kinderdijk in the northwest of the Alblasserwaard

The Alblasserwaard (Dutch pronunciation: [ˈɑlblɑsərˌʋaːrt]) is a polder in the province of South Holland, Netherlands. It is mainly known for the windmills of Kinderdijk, located near the village of Kinderdijk in the polder's northwestern part.

== History ==
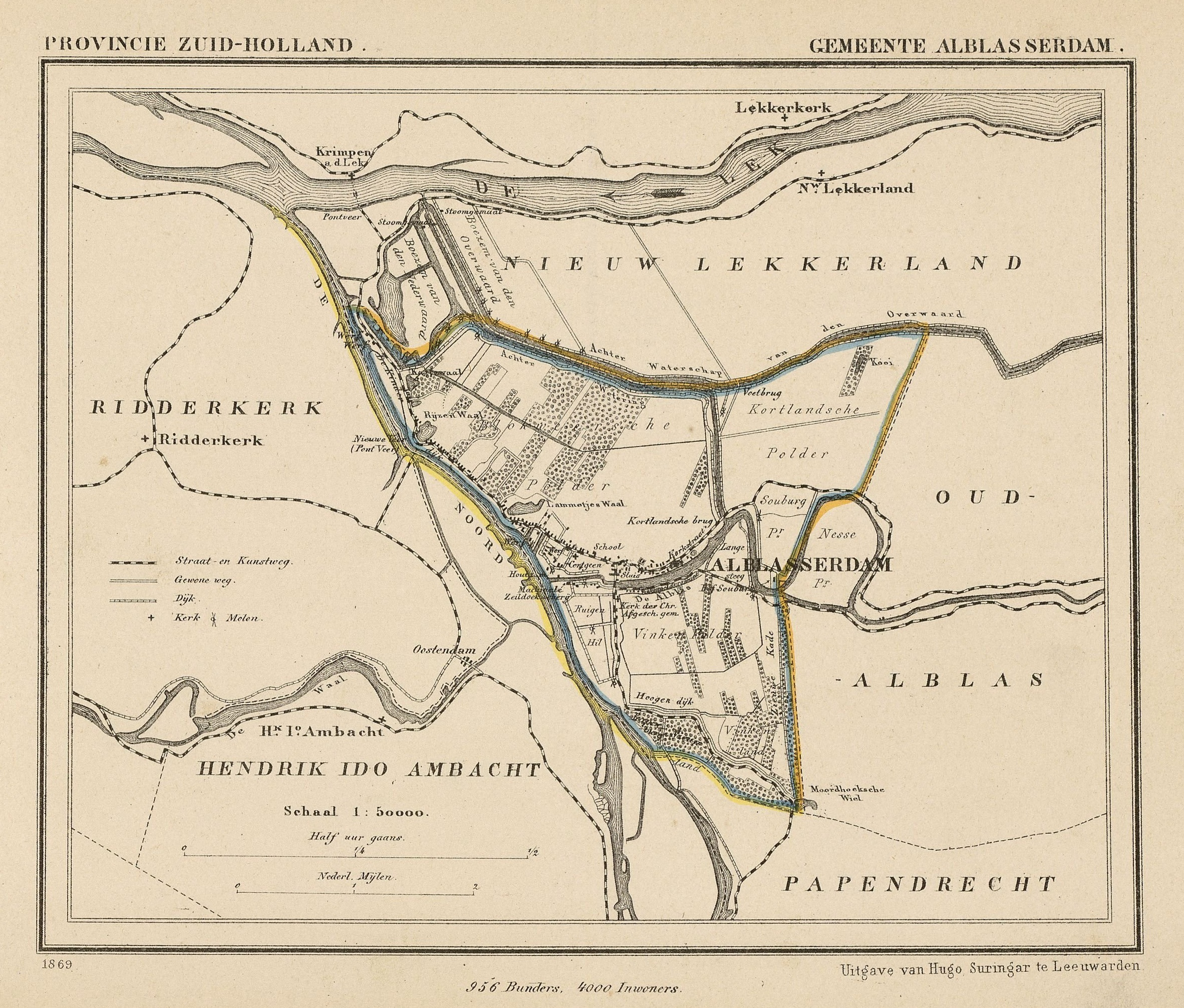
Western border of the Alblasserwaard in 1866. Hendrik-Ido-Ambacht and Dordrecht are west of the area, on the other side of the Noord river. Alblasserdam and Papendrecht are in the Alblasserwaard.

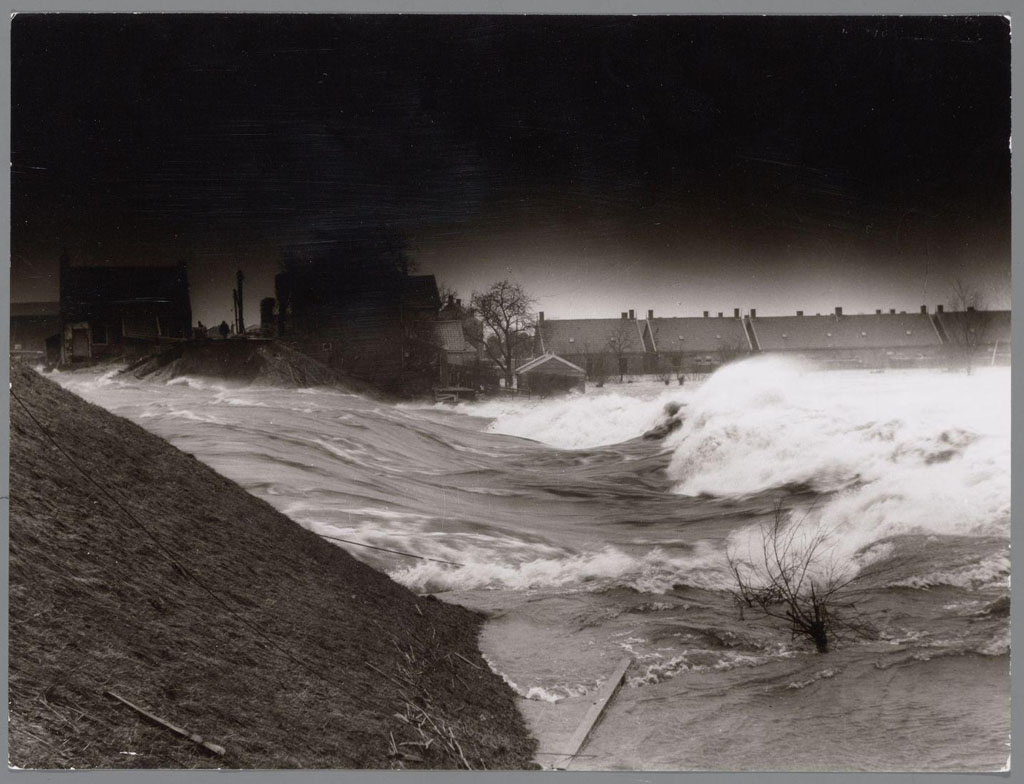
Dike burst near Papendrecht during the North Sea flood of 1953

The first human inhabitants of the Alblasserwaard settled there after the last ice age, around 10.000 years ago. The ice had not reached the area itself, but eolian deposits created high points in the wet environment. These high points were places where hunter-gatherers settled, as archaeological investigations in the area have shown.

During the Middle Ages, several canals and dikes were created to reclaim the land. The last part was diked in the second half of the 14th century, following the permanent flooding of Woude and Donkersloot. However, numerous floods continued to happen throughout the history of the area, as it is bound by rivers and watercourses on all sides.

During World War II, the Bombing of Rotterdam also damaged the Alblasserwaard, when both the village center of Alblasserdam and a part of Papendrecht were hit by German bombs.

It was flooded during the North Sea flood of 1953.

== Geography and population ==
The Alblasserwaard is bordered by rivers on all sides. To the north is the Lek, to the west runs the Noord and to the south the river Merwede. On the east side are the Merwede-Kanaal, the Linge and the Oude Zederik, together forming the boundary with Vijfheerenlanden. The village of Kinderdijk, well known for its windmills, is located at the northwest corner of the Alblasserwaard, where the Noord and the Lek join.

Most of the Alblasserwaard is rural, but, partially under the influence of the cities of Rotterdam and Dordrecht on the borders of the area, the south and west are urbanised.

The largest cities in the Alblasserwaard are Gorinchem, with 35,000 inhabitants, and Papendrecht with slightly over 30,000 people. Both are on the southern borders of the Alblasserwaard.

The municipalities in the Alblasserwaard are:

- Alblasserdam
- Gorinchem
- Hardinxveld-Giessendam
- Molenlanden
- Papendrecht
- Sliedrecht
- Zederik
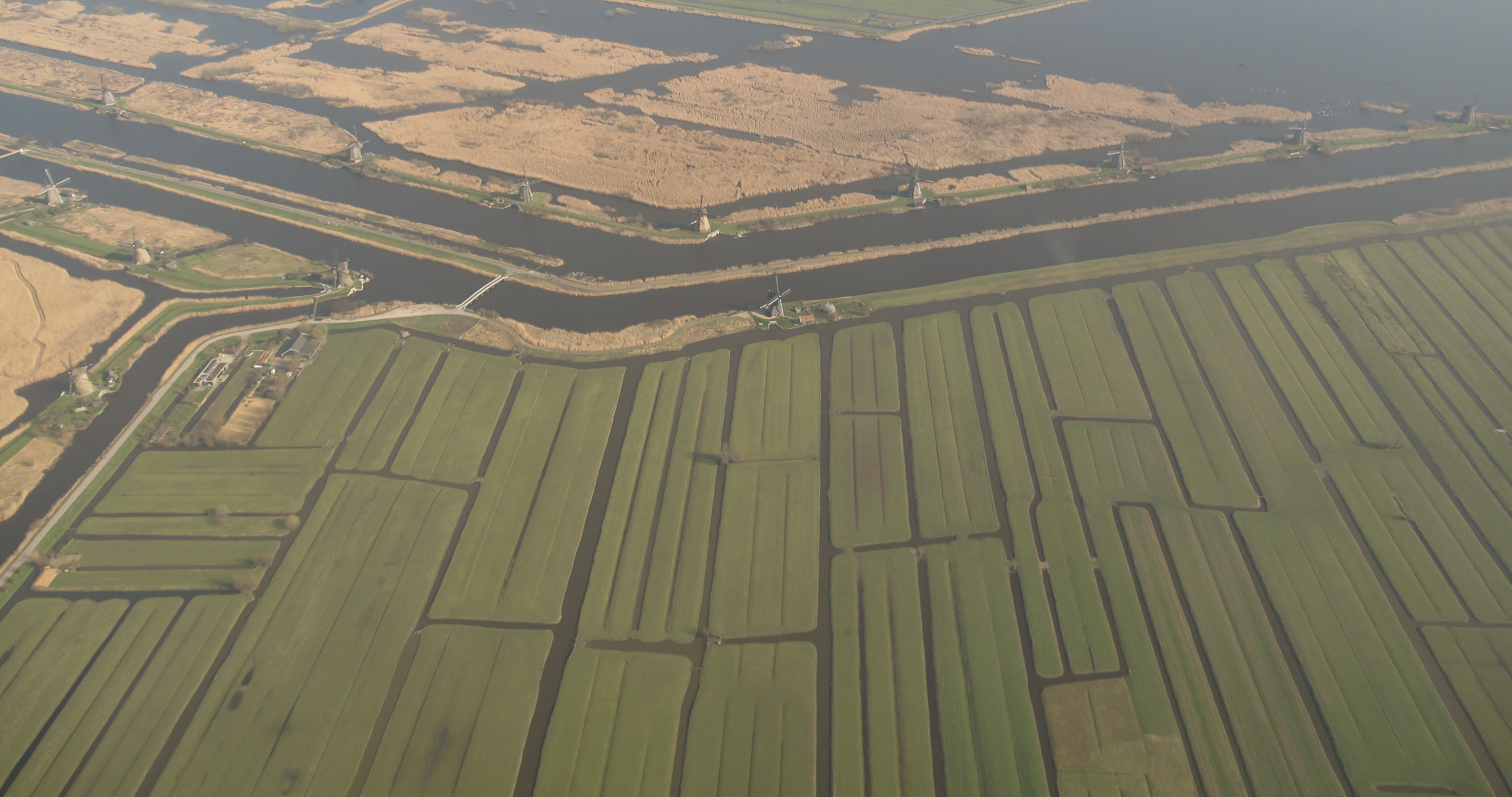
Kinderdijk, several windmills

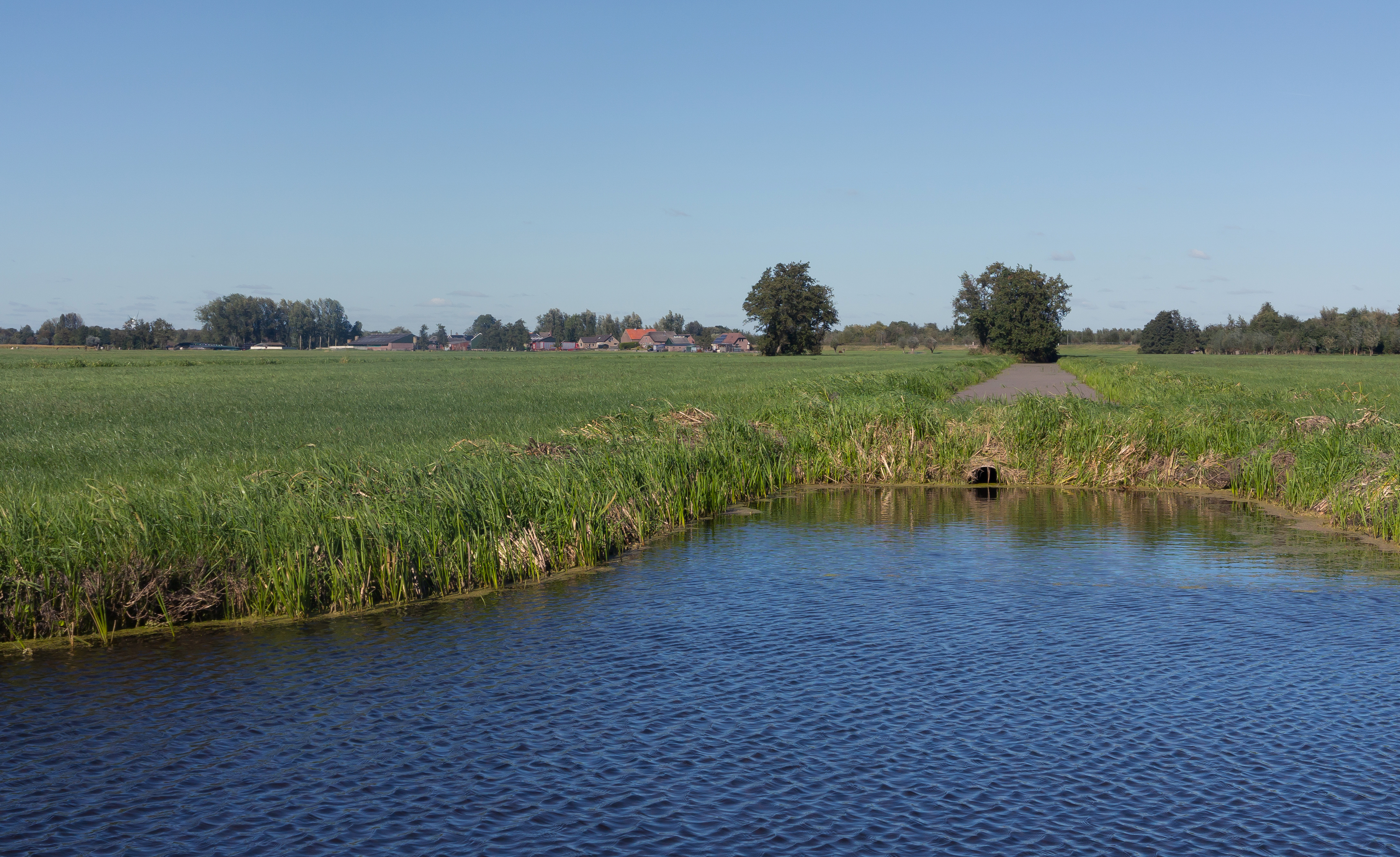
between Meerkerk and Ameide, ditch in the polder

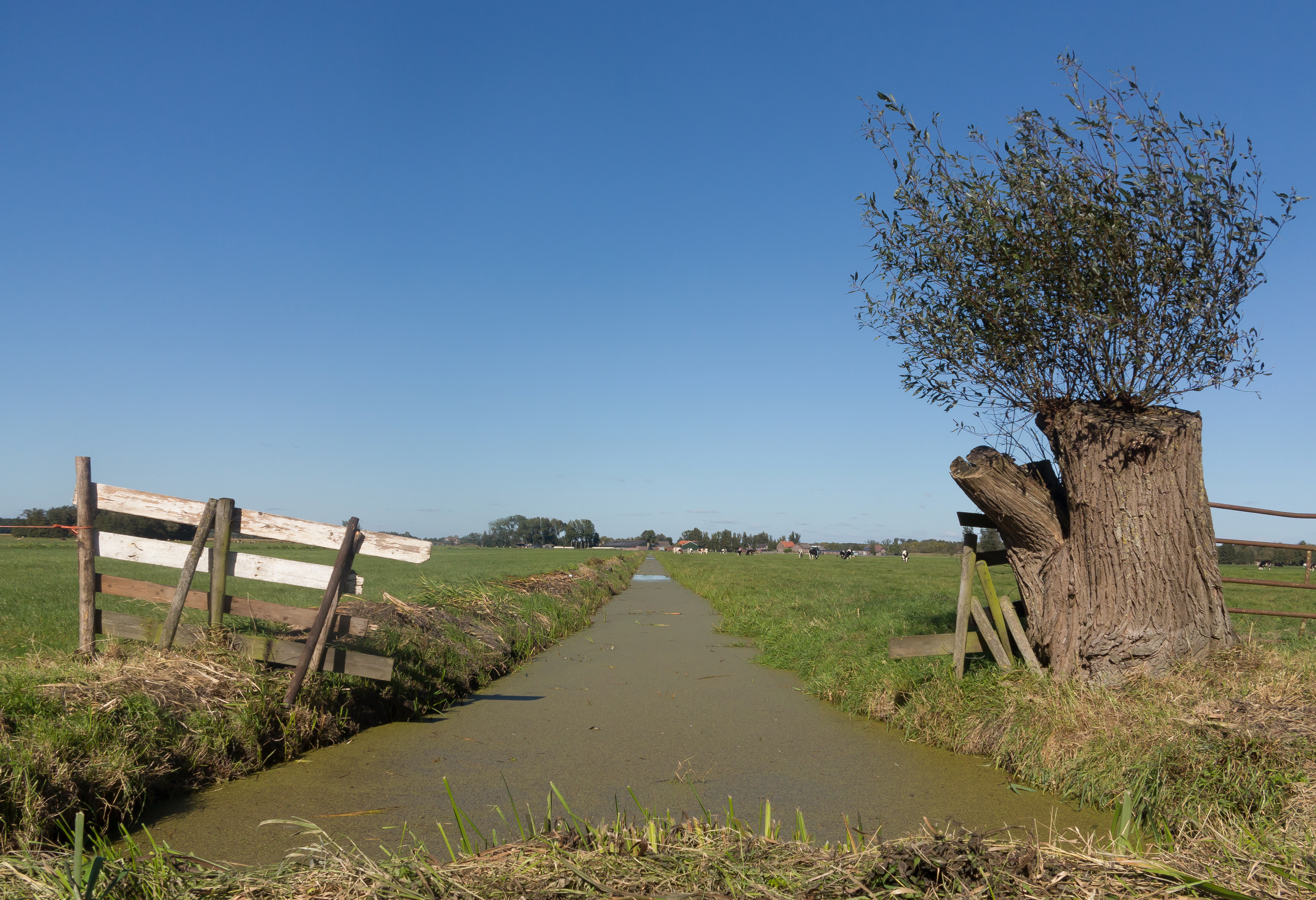
between Ameide and Meerkerk, ditch in the polder

== Geology ==
Extensive parts of the Netherlands are below sea level, and the Alblasserwaard is no different. Most of it has been wrestled from the water through land reclamation, using the windmills on the Kinderdijk. This process led to the area being full of dikes alongside the rivers. Most of the Alblasserwaard is grassland, where in the spring and summer one will find herds of cows, sheep and goats. The ground consists of clay.

== Nature and recreation ==
While large parts of the Alblasserwaard are owned by farmers, or are populated, some areas are open to the public for recreation.

- The windmills of Kinderdijk are a major tourist attraction.
- In the southwest of the Alblasserwaard is the Alblasserbos, an artificial forest area where deer and foxes live, as well as numerous smaller species.
- Roughly between Streefkerk and Brandwijk is the area Donkse Laagten, which is under the protection of the Dutch government forestry authority Staatsbosbeheer.
- There are three free camping spots in the Alblasserwaard, as part of a project by Staatsbosbeheer to promote legal camping in the wild. These are located respectively in the Alblasserbos, the Donkse Laagten and the Avelingen.
- The Lammetjeswiel is a recreational area within the village of Alblasserdam. It is a popular swimming area, with governmental checks of the water condition twice a month.
