= Dahlem =

Dahlem can refer to:

- Dahlem (Berlin), a district of Berlin, part of the borough Steglitz-Zehlendorf
- Dahlem, North Rhine-Westphalia, a municipality in western Germany
- Dahlem, Rhineland-Palatinate, a municipality in south-western Germany
- Dahlem, Lower Saxony, a municipality in northern Germany
- Dalem Konferenzen, a workshop series in Berlin

== See also ==
- Dalem (disambiguation)
