= Dalum =

Dalum may refer to:

- Dalum, Alberta
- Dalum, a district of Odense, Denmark
- Dalum, a location in Geeste, Emsland, Lower Saxony, Germany
- Dalum, Ghana, a community in Kumbungu District
- Dalum, Sweden
- Dalum IF, a Danish association football club
