= Henry of Gorkum =

Dutch theologian and philosopher

Henry of Gorkum (c. 1378 – February 19, 1431) was a Dutch theologian known for his commentaries on St. Thomas Aquinas and his defense of Thomism.

== Life and career ==
Henry was born in Gorkum in the Netherlands. He was a colleague of John Capreolus at the University of Paris, holding positions there between about 1395 and 1419. He taught philosophy at University of Cologne, and from 1420 he was director of a self-funded bursar there. He became University of Cologne Vice-Chancellor in 1424.

Later he was appointed a canon of the Basilica of St. Ursula. He was a defender of Thomism in the dispute between the followers of St. Albert Magnus and those of St. Thomas Aquinas at the university.
