= Berkheide =

Human settlement in the Netherlands

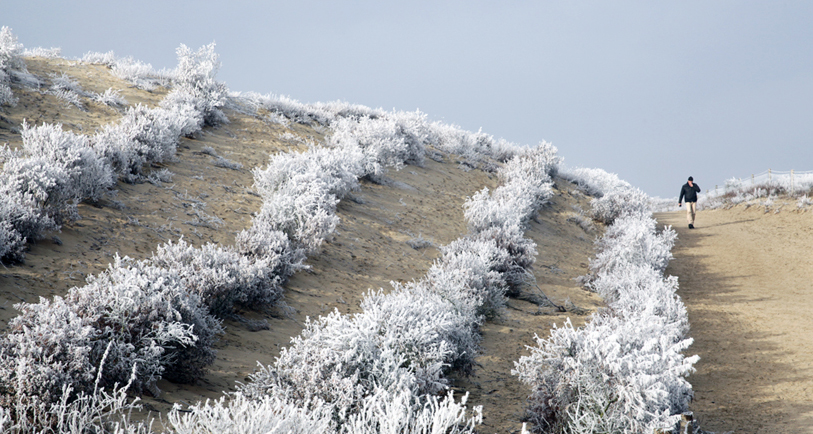
- Interactive map of Berkheide
- Type: Dune
- Location: Wassenaar
- Coordinates: 52.104051°N 4.225334°E
- Area: 1,700 hectares (4,200 acres)

Berkheide is a dunal area on the Dutch North Sea coast between Scheveningen and Katwijk. It covers 1700 hectares and lies largely in the municipality of Wassenaar, South Holland. Together with Meijendel it forms the Natura 2000 area Meijendel & Berkheide. It is part of the Hollands Duin management unit (for owner Staatsbosbeheer). Berkheide is also the name of former village that was located in the area for several hundred years.
