= Dalem, Netherlands =

Dalem is a village in the Tielerwaard region in the municipality of Gorinchem, in the Dutch province of South Holland. The village belonged to the province of Gelderland until 1986 and was part of the former municipality of Vuren. Until January 1, 1818, Dalem was the name of the municipality, which was then renamed Vuren.

== History ==
In 1254, Floris van Dalem was enfeoffed with the lordship of Dalem by Jan van der Leede and Hugo van Arkel. In 1423, his descendant Lord Floris van Dalem sold the lordships of Dalem, Schuvenoord, and Staden for 2260 crowns to the Gelderland Duke Arnoud. From him, the ownership passed to Charles of Egmont, Duke of Guelders, who first pawned Dalem to Willem van Rossum for 300 Rhineland guilders.

On June 16, 1518, other sources mention 1517, Duke Charles granted the lordship of Dalem for life to Christoffel, Count of Meurs. This warrior was favored by both Duke Charles and Emperor Charles V, as he remained lord of Dalem until his death in 1566. A document from 1518 mentions that besides a chapel, Dalem had 13 to 18 houses. However, these houses were so poor that no rent was collected.

== Dalem and water ==
The natural location of Dalem, in the lowest part of the Tielerwaard, has regularly caused flooding over the centuries. Together with the entire Betuwe region, the Tielerwaard served as a water catchment area during times of extremely high water, protecting the even lower-lying Alblasserwaard and Vijfheerenlanden.

Lower Dalem is the lowest-lying area of the Tielerwaard, where river water will flow in case of dike breaches. It is essentially located in a basin, especially if the dikes of the Meuse River (dutch: Maas Rivier) fail. After a flood, this water can be drained again into the lower course of the river through excavations of the overflow areas and through the Dalem de-inundation lock. It is also possible to excavate three dike sections at Dalem to accelerate the drainage of water. This is recognizable by the paved sections of the dike between the asphalted road sections after the dike reinforcements. Waiting for all the water to be drained through the de-inundation lock would take too long. Sheet pile walls have been installed in the dike to prevent the holes from wearing too far. They are covered with concrete beams, visible on the outside of the dike.

The overflow areas have been preserved and were even adapted to the new standards with the dike reinforcements of 1996. The level difference with Tiel is approximately 7.20 meters. In 1995, after the near-flood disaster, a water board official deemed it irresponsible to build large-scale houses here. In the event of a dike breach in Tiel, the inflowing water will be captured inland by the raised dikes, and the water level could possibly reach a height of 10 meters. Due to the enormous water force, many houses will be swept away (see below 1809).

=== The de-inundation lock ===
The history of the Dalem lock dates back to 1284 when the Lords of the Vijf Heerenlanden decided to build a dike ring around their area (the Diefdijk) and also to have the option to drain the excess water through an outlet lock at Dalem. As was customary at the time, this lock would be entirely made of wood. The first stone for the lock in its approximately current form was laid in 1661. Dike construction began in the 13th century, before which there were no dike breaches because there were no dikes.

A separate book could be written about the phenomenon of dike breaches in the entire Tielerwaard region. For Dalem, the consequences of the dike breaches in 1726, 1728, and 1729 are still visible, and the wheels formed at that time are integral parts of the landscape. A wheel is formed by the inward flowing water that rapidly washes away the ground on the inside of the dike to great depths. Depths of 20 meters are not uncommon. Even after almost three centuries, the Wheels still bear witness to the calamity of drowned people and animals and the loss of homes and possessions, with all its consequences. The dike residents were generally not very wealthy.

Dike breaches at that time were usually caused by ice dams in the river, blocking the flow of water. Sometimes the dams became so high that houses on the outside of the dike were destroyed.

In the year 1809, on the night of January 14 to 15, there was a dike breach in the Over-Betuwe area, and work began on January 18 to create outlets in the Dalem overflow areas. By January 25, 1809, so much water had flowed down through the Betuwe region that the city of Gorinchem was in danger. King Louis Napoleon (it was during the French period) unexpectedly arrived in the city with his entourage from Vianen and stayed at the (old) Doelen (Molenstraat). When he visited the threatened areas and was on the Dalemsedijk with his carriage, a part of the dike broke. The king had to be taken away by boat. When the formwork collapsed on the Kortendijk on January 30, the water from the Linge River flowed into the lower city through the Hoogstraat and the alleys. Soldiers and citizens managed to close the gaps with great effort and prevented the city from being flooded.

There was also a dike breach at Kedichem, and the entire Alblasserwaard region was submerged.

Dalem
- Village
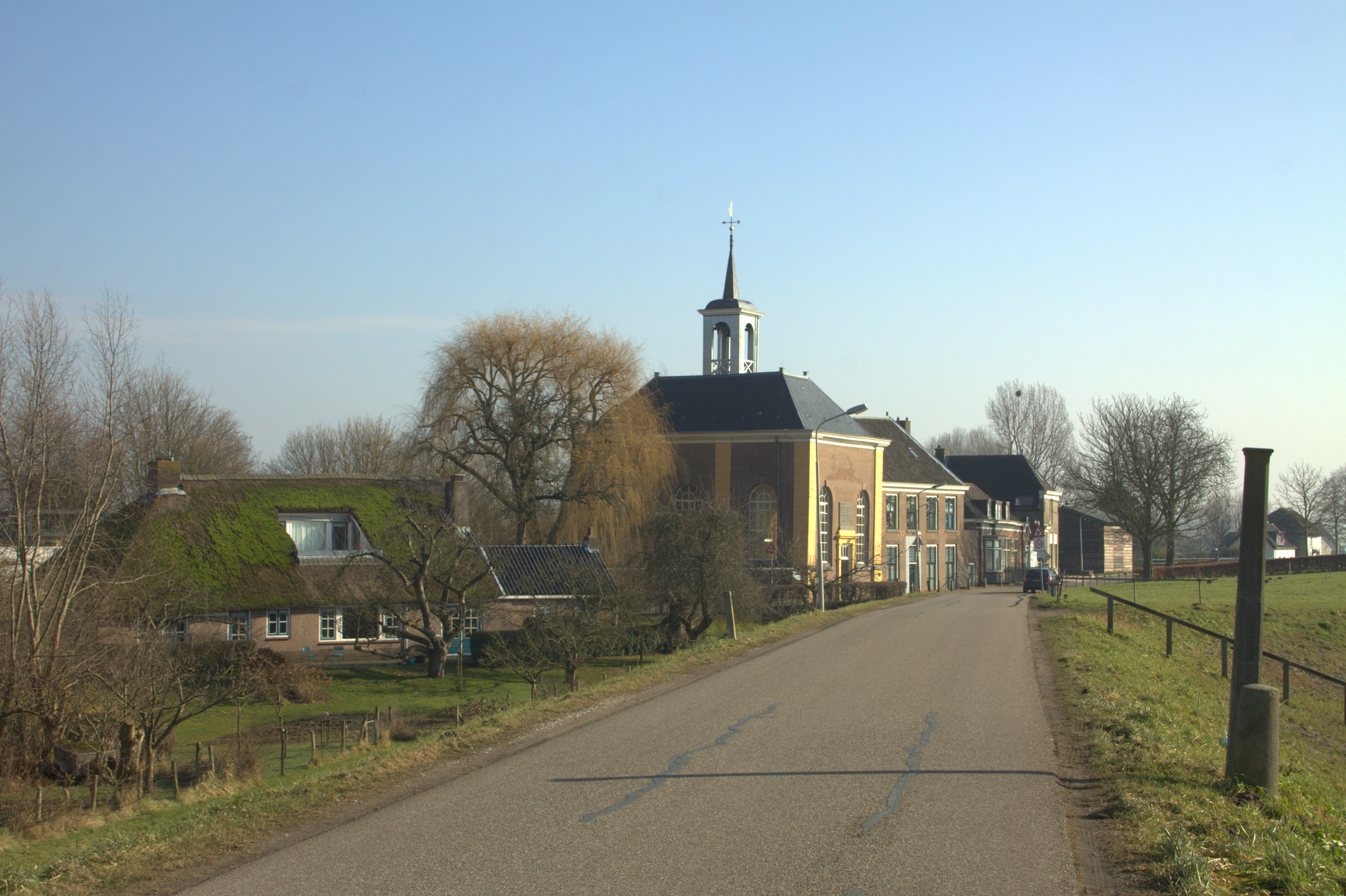
- View on Dalem

- Location in the province of South Holland in the Netherlands Location in the Netherlands
- Coordinates: 51°49′40″N 05°00′34″E
- Country: Netherlands
- Province: South Holland
- Municipality: Gorinchem

Area
  - Total: 1.50 km^{2} (0.58 sq mi)
- Elevation: 0.3 m (0.98 ft)

Population (2021)
  - Total: 885
  - Density: 590/km^{2} (1,530/sq mi)
- Time zone: UTC+1 (CET)
  - Summer (DST): UTC+2 (CEST)
- Postal code: 4213
- Dialing code: 0183

== Gallery ==
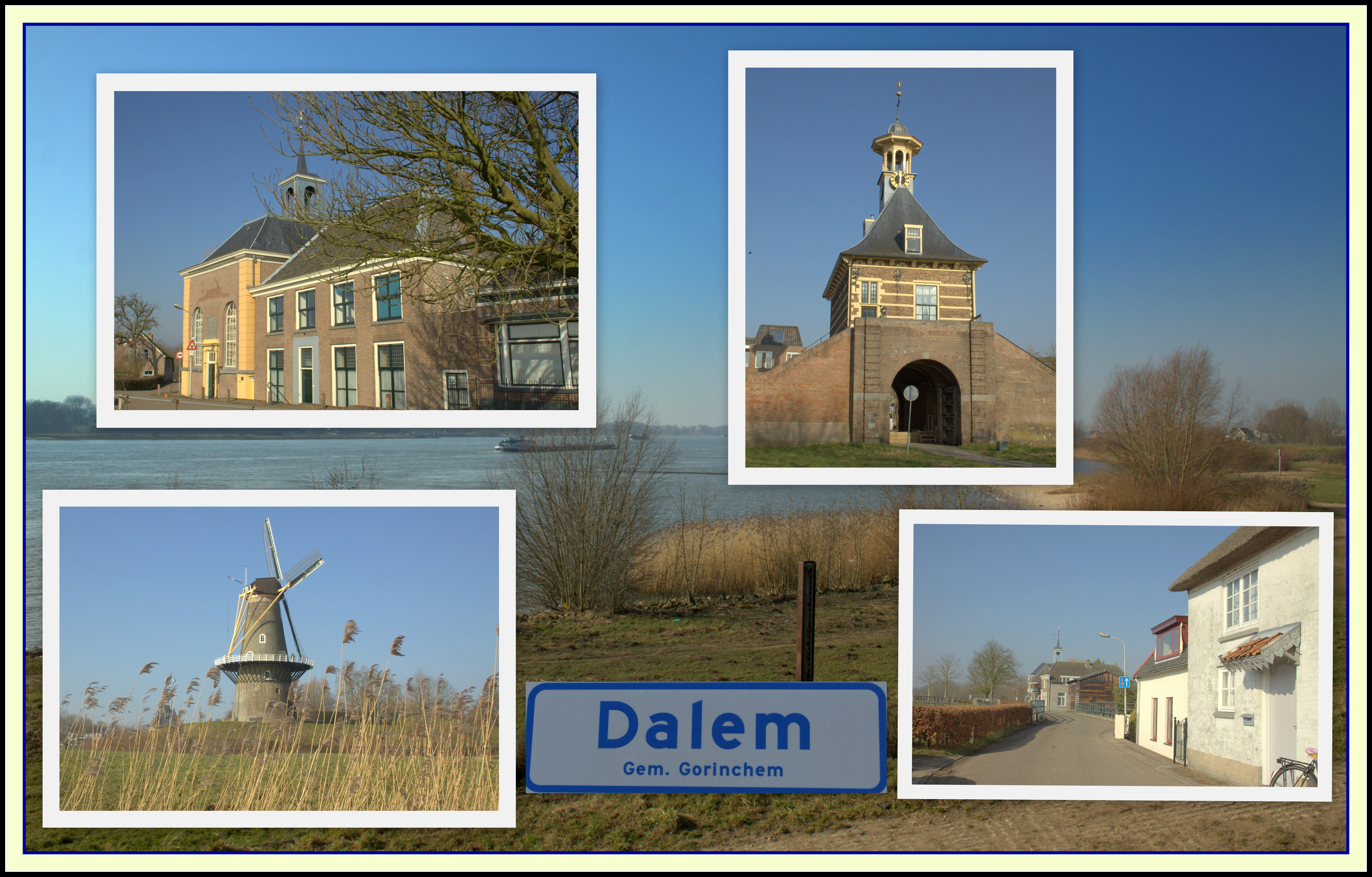
Postcard of Dalem

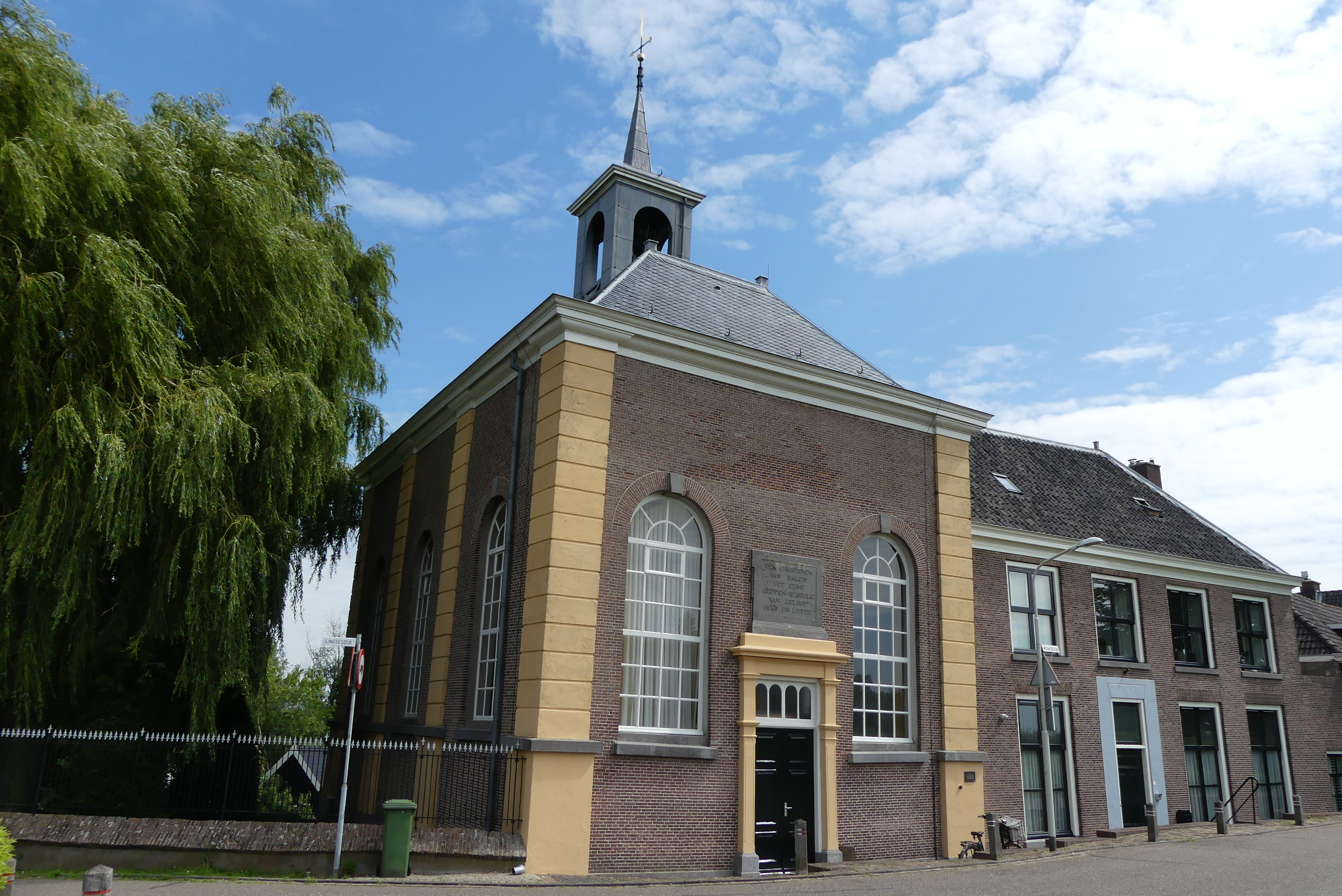
Dutch Reformed church
