= Wierickerschans =

Coordinates: 52°04′54″N 4°47′00″E

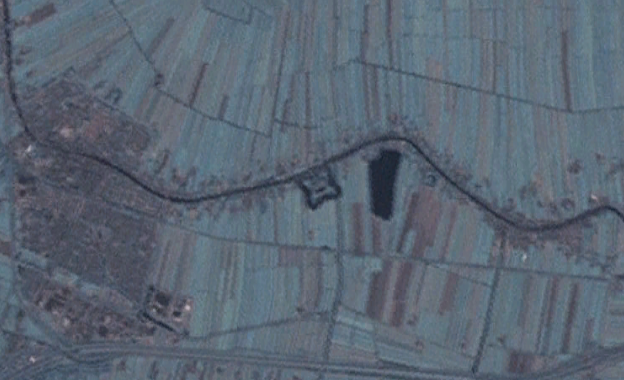
Landsat 7 image of the fort (the star-shaped object near the middle of the image).

The Wierickerschans Fort is a part of the Old Dutch Waterline or "Oude Hollandse Waterlinie". This was a defence system that allowed large parts of the country (Holland) to be flooded (inundated). Thus protecting the main towns and city in the West against invading forces from the East. It was in use right up to the 19th century. The Fort was built on the site where in 1672 Stadtholder Willem III (William of Orange, who later became King of England) had his headquarters during the war against the French. The Fort is centrally located within the Old Dutch Waterline that stretched from Muiden down to the Biesbosch.

== History ==
=== Disaster Year ===
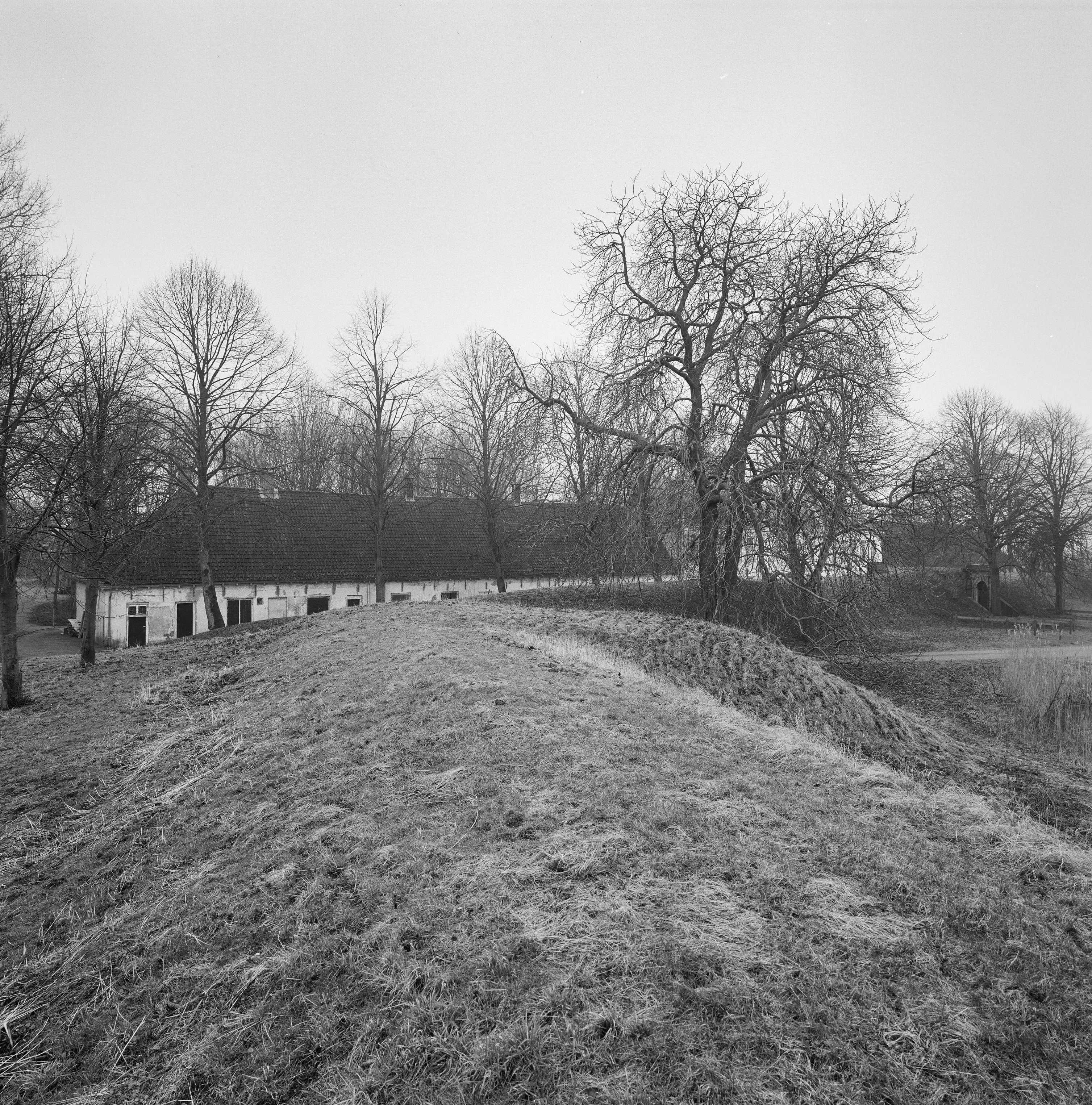
Fort with walls, planting, barracks block and gateway (right), seen from northern bastion.

In the "disaster year" of 1672 the Netherlands was at war with France, England, Munster and Cologne. In June of that year the French attacked the province of Gelderland and conquered several neglected fortified towns. The cities of Utrecht and Woerden were occupied, but to the West the enemy encountered the inaccessible body of water of the Old Dutch Waterline. The water stretched from Muiden on the Zuiderzee down to the Biesbosch. On higher ground reinforcements were situated.

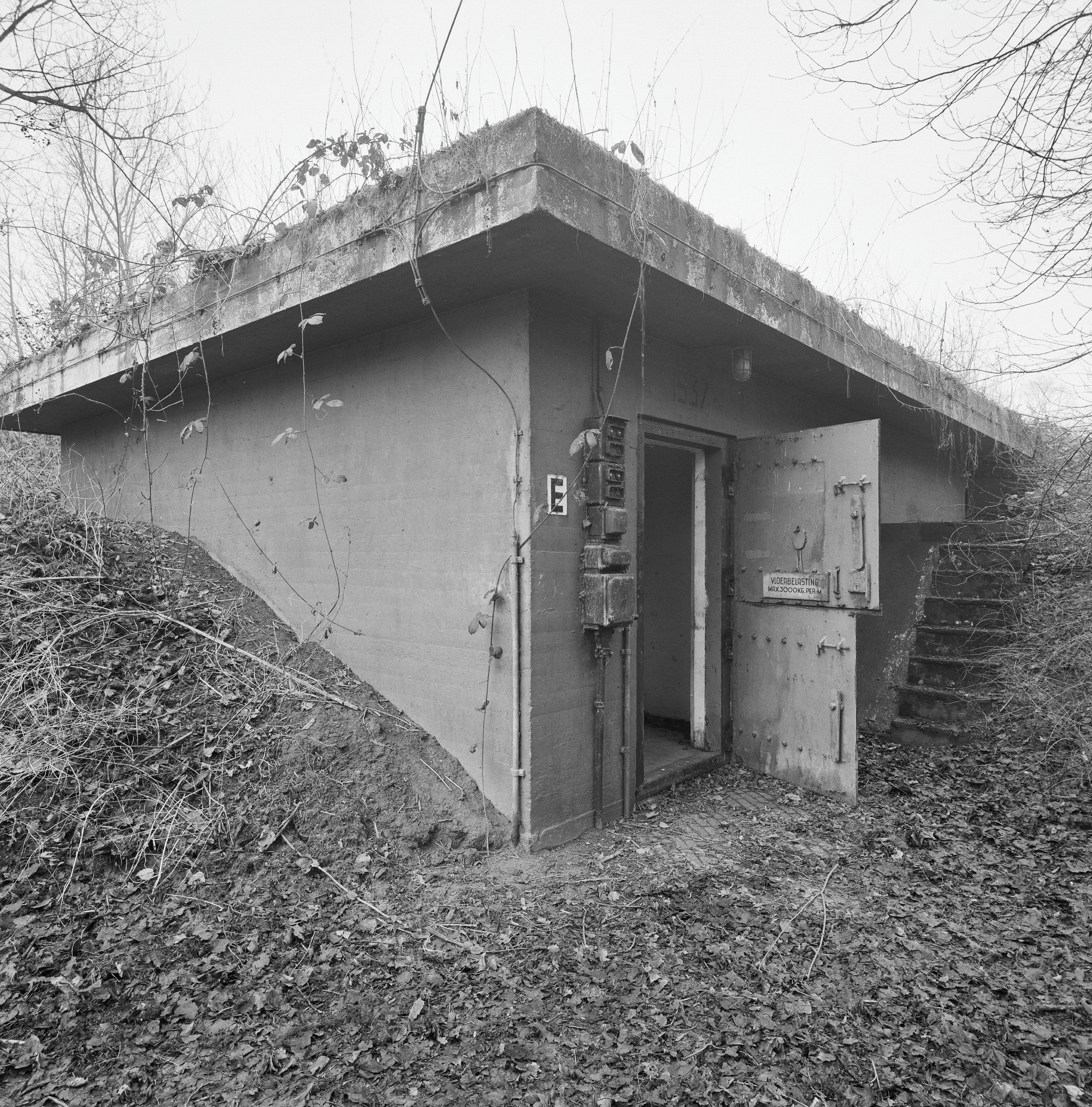
One of the many bunkers at the Fort.

The navigable rivers and the dikes however were still accessible to enemy forces. The river Oude Rijn, that cut the water defense system between Nieuwerbrug and Bodegraven was one of these weak points. For that reason three small redoubts had been built hurriedly to stop the enemy in case they sailed down the river or marched along the dikes into the West of Holland where the main cities (e.g. Leiden, The Hague, Delft, Amsterdam and Gouda) were located.

Shortly after Christmas an advance party of the French army moved over the frozen water of the defense system to Zwammerdam and Bodegraven. Both towns were plundered and set alight. After the ice melted however, the invaders were surrounded on all sides. There was no way back through the water and all routes to Gouda, Leiden, Uithoorn and Nieuwerbrug were well guarded by Dutch troops. To the surprise and relief of the French however, it appears that the three redoubts at Nieuwerbrug had been abandoned, allowing a return to the army in Woerden without risk.

Stadtholder Willem III, returning from an unsuccessful attack on the French supply routes in Belgium was just one day late to attack the fleeing French division at Nieuwerbrug. He narrowly missed the opportunity of a major victory. In order to prevent a repeat of this failure and to close the gap in the defense line, he commanded the construction of a strong well manned and supplied Fort in January 1673. In August of the year the Wierickerschans Fort was completed.

=== "Kruithuis" ===
When the fort lost its strategic value because the Line was moved eastward, it was decided that the fort was to be used as a storage facility for gunpowder ("kruithuis"). For this purpose, a large warehouse is built with thick walls. Between 1826 and 1830 some changes took place in the floor plan of the fort. The fort was partially divided by a canal that ran from east to west. This canal was designed to make it easier to transport gunpowder barrels.

=== World Wars ===
From 1870 until 1915 the fort functioned as a Central Depot. This depot could function to supply soldiers. From January 1915 until May 1917 the fort was used as an internment camp. Foreign military officers were kept here. Despite the fact that the internment camp was officially dissolved on May 15, 1917, until November 1918 7 English officers were held at Fort Wierickerschans. During the Second World War the Fort was initially ignored. Later on a department of the German Marine settled in the Fort. After May 6, 1945, a few collaborators were held here. During the Cold War antennes of a radio network of the Dutch Army were placed. Nowadays the fort is a party- and congress centre.

== Today ==
Fort Wierickerschans is still in good condition and is unique in the world on the grounds of its design and historically important buildings. It is currently owned by Staatsbosbeheer.
