= Anthonie Verstraelen =

Dutch painter

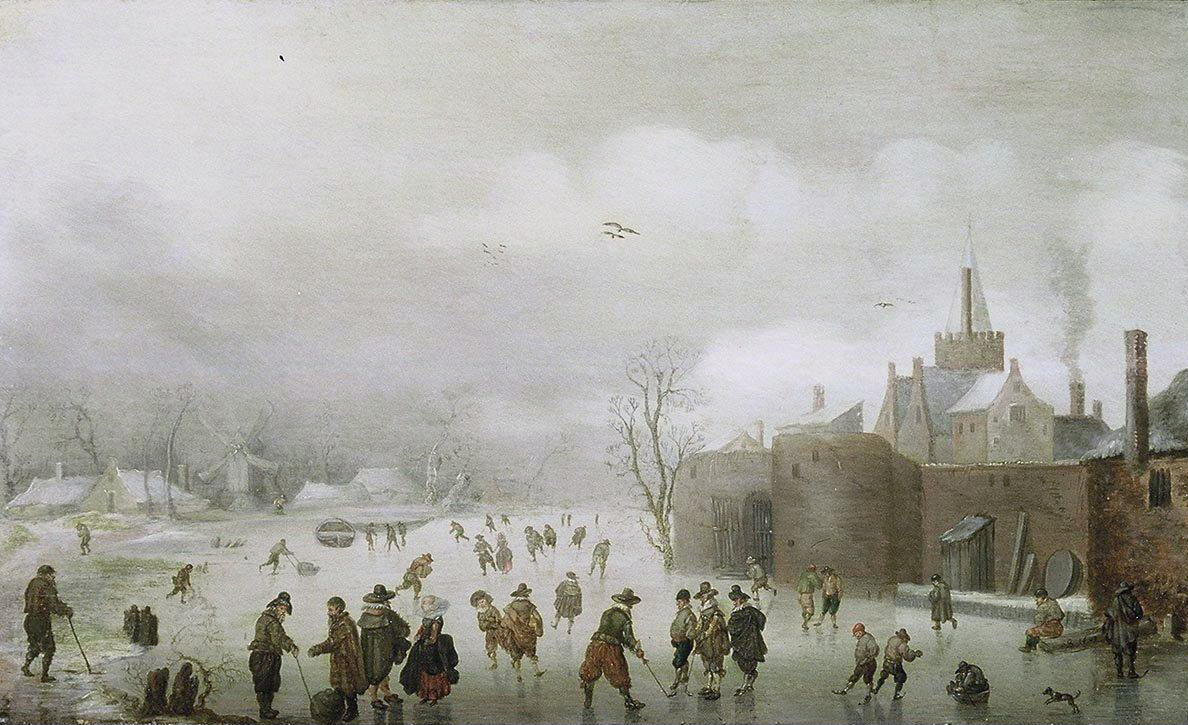
Winterlandschap, 1623

Anthonie Verstraelen or Van Stralen (Gorkum, 1593/1594 - Amsterdam, 1641) was a Dutch landscape painter. He is best known (with Hendrik Avercamp and his nephew Barend Avercamp) for his winter scenes.

Gillis van Stralen, Antonie's father, was a textile merchant. The family originated in Weert but moved between 1584–1590 to Gorkum, presumably because of Alessandro Farnese, Duke of Parma's armies marching through the area.

We don't hear much from Anthonie Verstraelen, until 1635 when he married Catalijntje van Oosten from Antwerp. The location of the wedding is unknown. The couple went to live in Oude Spiegelstraat, near Singel. In Amsterdam Antonie got into a dispute with the Sint Lucasgilde, for its laxness in allowing in too many non-citizen painters.

In 1641 he was buried in the Westerkerk. In 1644 his two children inherited two hundred guilder each from the sale of their father's paintings. The paintings must have been sold very cheap. His widow remarried their guardian Emmanuel Jacobszoon van Hoogerheijm, an unknown Leiden 'fijnschilder'. Three months later their first son became born, Jacob van Hogerheijm, who also became a forgotten painter.
