= Donkse Laagten =

Protected area in South Holland, Netherlands

- IUCN category IV (habitat/species management area)
- A view of a part of the Donkse Laagten

- Location within Netherlands
- Location: Molenlanden, South Holland
- Coordinates: 51.8884°N 4.7845°E
- Area: 1.9 km^{2} (0.73 sq mi)
- Governing body: Staatsbosbeheer

The Donkse Laagten is a small Dutch nature reserve of roughly two square kilometres in the Alblasserwaard in the province of South Holland. It is located in the municipality of Molenlanden, between the towns Streefkerk to the northwest and Bleskensgraaf to the south. The area is governed by the organization Staatsbosbeheer. There is no public transportation to the Donkse Laagten, but it is open for recreational use.

The Donkse Laagten is mainly notable for three things:

- It is a site of relative importance in bird conservation and protection. There are three duck decoys.
- It is one of the roughly 40 sites in the Netherlands where it is legal to camp in the wild, as authorized by Staatsbosbeheer and several other organizations.
- In 2002 and again in 2006 the area was in the national news for first sightings and later the capture of a Common snapping turtle, which is not native to the area and is considered somewhat dangerous.

During the 2001 United Kingdom foot-and-mouth crisis, which spread to the Netherlands, the area was one of the nature reserves to be closed in order to prevent danger to humans.
