= Gorinchem =

- Municipality
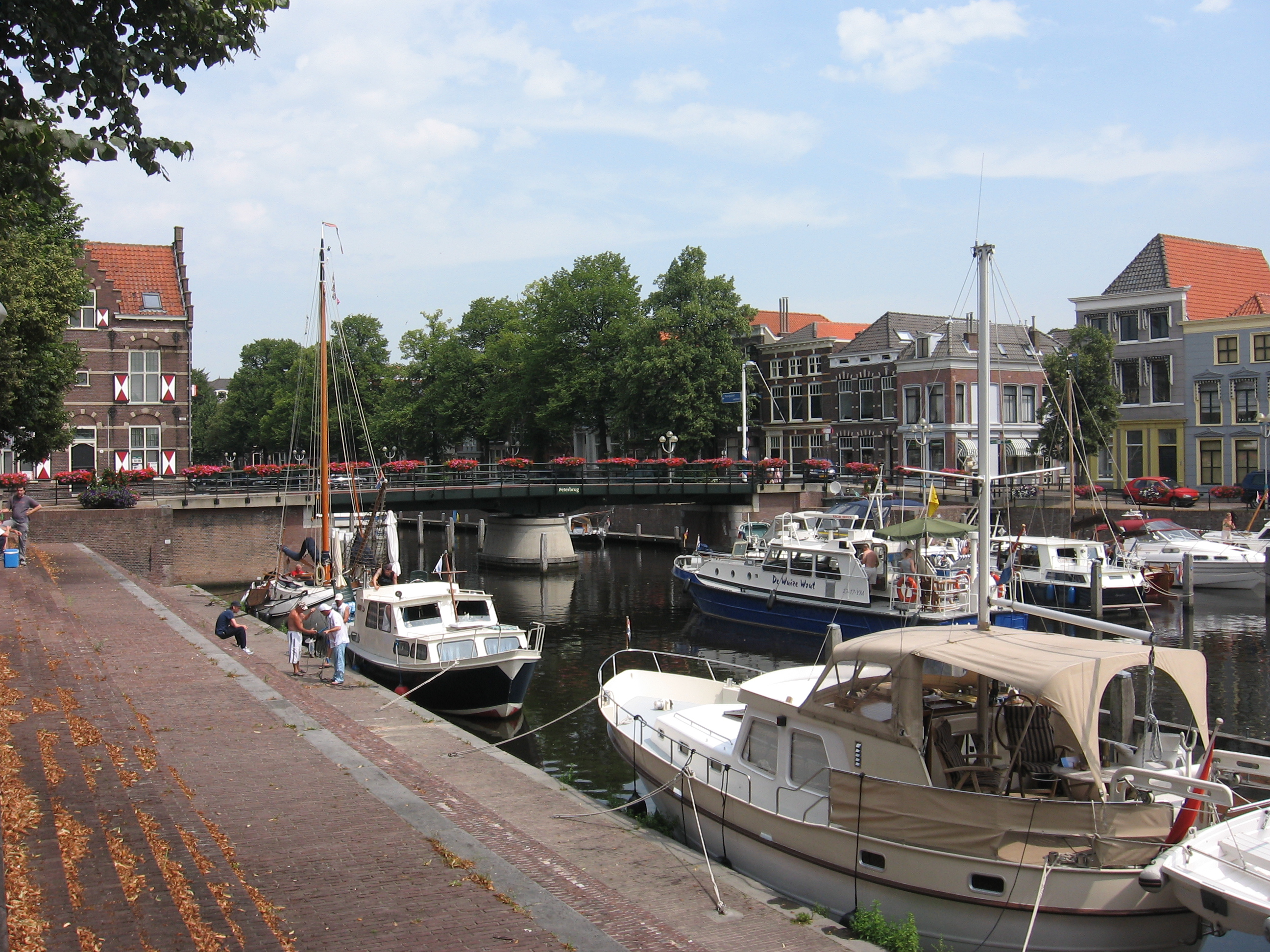
- Lingehaven in Gorinchem

- Flag Coat of arms

- Location in South Holland
- Coordinates: 51°49′50″N 4°58′27″E
- Country: Netherlands
- Province: South Holland

Government
  - Body: Municipal council
  - Mayor: Reinie Melissant-Briene (CDA)

Area
  - Total: 21.93 km^{2} (8.47 sq mi)
  - Land: 18.83 km^{2} (7.27 sq mi)
  - Water: 3.10 km^{2} (1.20 sq mi)
- Elevation: 2 m (6.6 ft)

Population (January 2021)
  - Total: 37,410
  - Density: 1,987/km^{2} (5,150/sq mi)
- Demonym: Gorkumer
- Time zone: UTC+1 (CET)
  - Summer (DST): UTC+2 (CEST)
- Postcode: 4200–4208
- Area code: 0183
- Website: www.gorinchem.nl

Gorinchem (/ˈɡɔːrkəm/; Dutch pronunciation: [ˈɣɔrkʏm] or [ˈɣɔrkəm]), also spelled Gorkum, is a city and municipality in the western Netherlands, in the province of South Holland. The municipality covers an area of 21.93 km^{2} (8.47 sq mi) of which 3.10 km^{2} (1.20 sq mi) is water. It had a population of 37,410 in 2021.

The municipality of Gorinchem also includes the population centre of Dalem.

== History ==
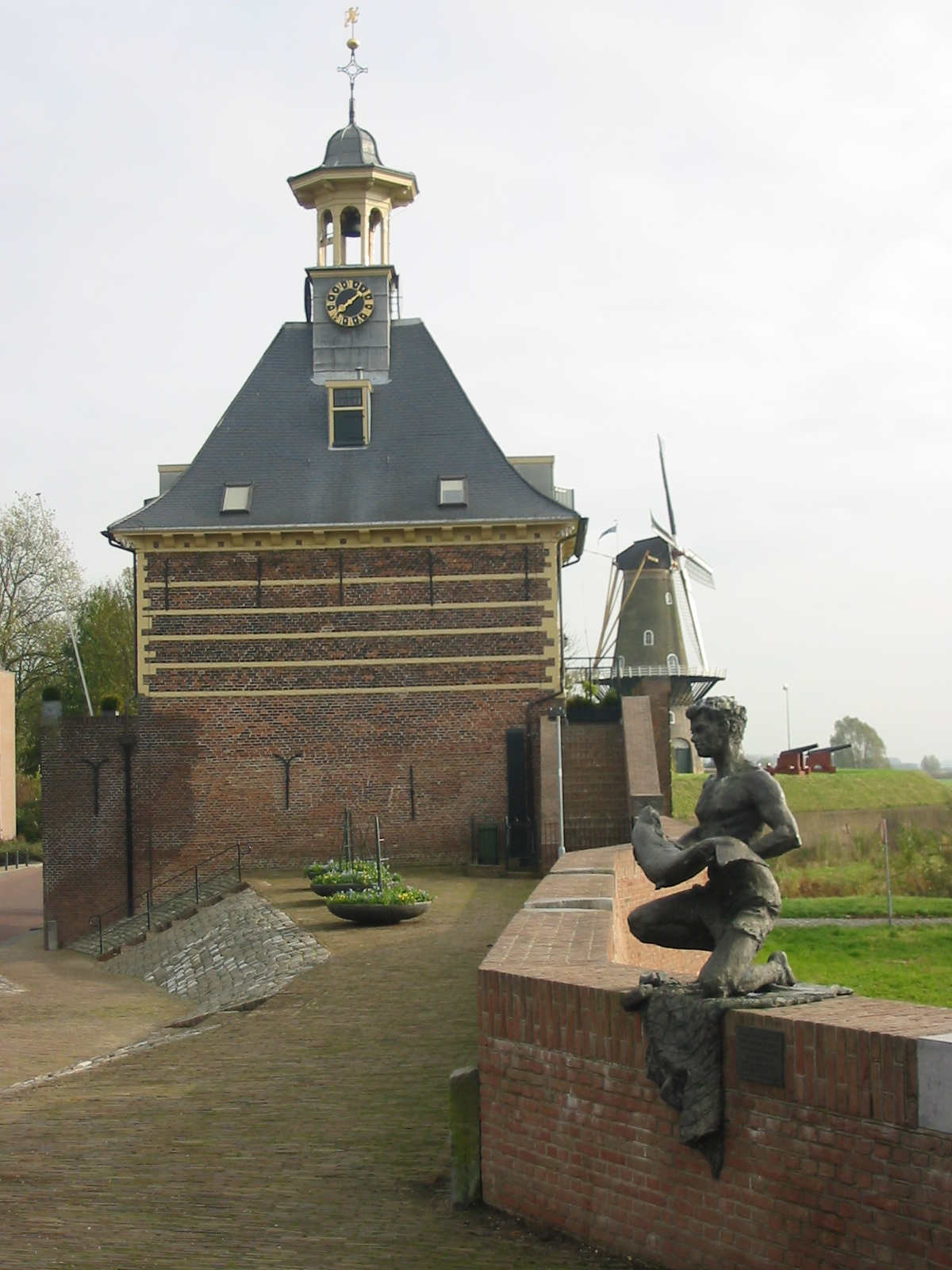
Dalem Gate

It is generally assumed that Gorinchem was founded c. 1000 AD by fishermen and farmers on the raised land near the mouth of the river Linge at the Merwede. Goriks Heem ("Home of Gorik" in early Middle Dutch) is first mentioned in a document from 1224 in which Floris IV granted people from Gorinchem exemption of toll payments throughout Holland.

Somewhere between 1247 and 1267, Gorinchem became property of the Lords of Arkel. At the end of the 13th century earthen mounds reinforced with palisades were built around the settlement to protect it from domination by the neighboring counties of Holland and Gelre. Half a century later real city walls were built complete with 7 gates and 23 watchtowers. Otto van Arkel granted it city rights on 11 November 1322.

Jan van Arkel had a dispute with Albert I, brother of Willem V of Holland, leading to war and subsequently to the annexation of Gorinchem to Holland in 1417. This resulted in increased trade and Gorinchem grew to be the eighth city of Holland.

Charles the Bold constructed the Blue Tower palace in Gorinchem in 1461. This castle was already demolished in 1578.

On 9 July 1572, the Watergeuzen (Dutch rebels against Spanish rule) conquered the city and captured 19 Catholic priests and monks. Because they refused to renounce their faith, these priests and monks were brought to Brielle where they were hanged and were from then on known among Catholics as the Martyrs of Gorkum.

The Martyrs of Gorkum were canonized by Pope Pius IX in 1867. Their martyrdom is commemorated annually in Gorinchem and has become an integral part of the city’s religious and cultural identity. As victims of religious persecution during the Eighty Years' War, their story symbolizes the broader conflict between Catholicism and Protestantism in the region. The martyrs hold a notable place in Dutch religious history, and their legacy continues to resonate with Catholics around the world.

By the 16th century, the city walls had deteriorated and were replaced with new fortifications and eleven bastions that are still almost completely intact. The new walls were completed in 1609 and were located further from the town centre, making the city twice as large. In 1673, Gorinchem became part of the old Dutch Water Line.

The city walls had four city gates: the Arkel Gate in the north, the Dalem Gate in the east, the Water Gate in the south (where the ferry to Woudrichem was), and the Kansel Gate in the west. Of these four gates, only the Dalem Gate remains. The others were removed in the 19th century to make way for vehicular traffic. A portion of the Water Gate was preserved in the gardens of the Rijksmuseum in Amsterdam.

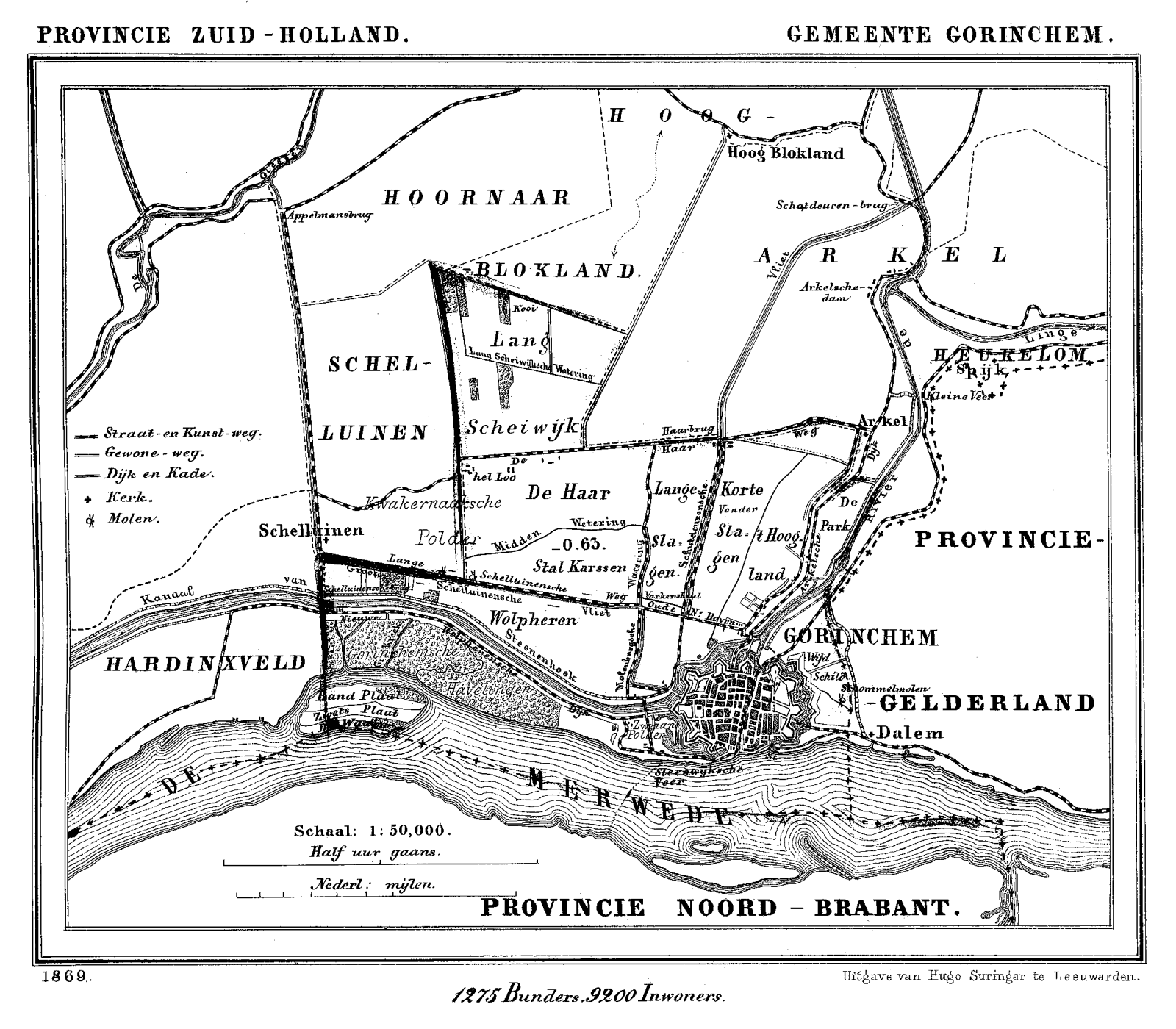
Map of Gorinchem of 1869.

In the 18th century, the economy went into decline. After the French domination, the retreating French troops established themselves in the bastion fortress of Gorinchem. After a three-month siege they capitulated but the city was heavily damaged.

During the Industrial Revolution, Gorinchem recovered. Increased shipping led to new canals being dug and a railway connection to the city. Its population quickly increased, filling the inner city, and new neighbourhoods had to be built outside the city walls.

At the beginning of the 20th century, expansion took place in the Lingewijk and West neighbourhoods. After World War II, expansion started in the north-western portion of the municipality which was completed in the 1970s. This was followed by development of the neighbourhoods Wijdschild and Laag Dalem east of the city center. In 1986, the town Dalem was added to the municipality.

In August 2021 ANWB named Gorinchem the most beautiful star fort in the Netherlands.

== Demographics ==
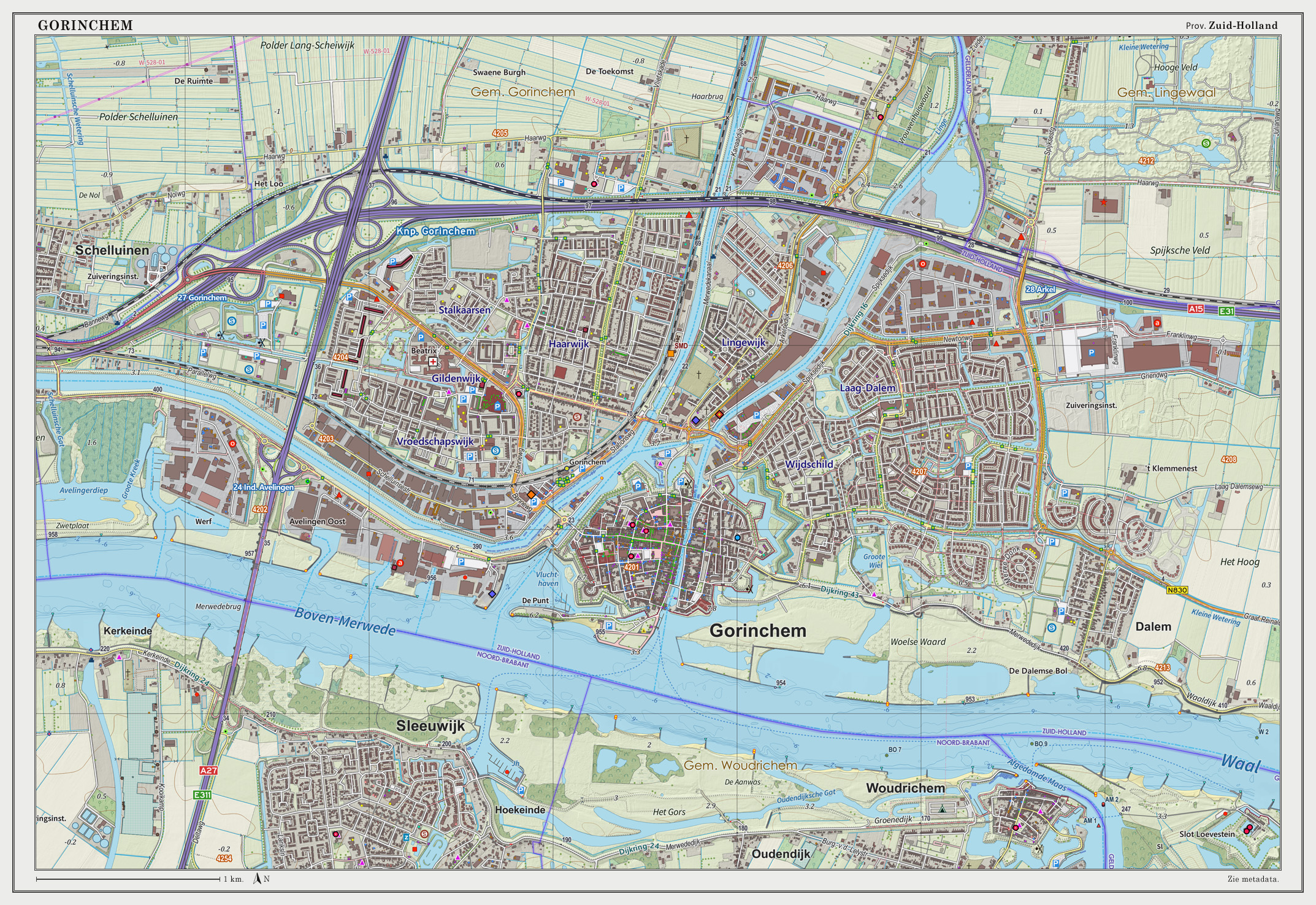
Map of Gorinchem, September 2014

Gorinchem had 37,456 inhabitants on 1 January 2021.

== Politics ==
The current mayor of Gorinchem is Reinie Melissant-Briene of the CDA. In 2023 a new municipal executive was agreed, consisting of the City Interest, VVD, CU-SGP, Gorcum Active and SP.

The municipal council of Gorinchem has 25 members, which are directly elected.

== Transport ==
The city is crossed by two motorways; the A15 on the northside, and the A27 on the westside.

The city also has a railway station: Gorinchem.

== Notable people ==
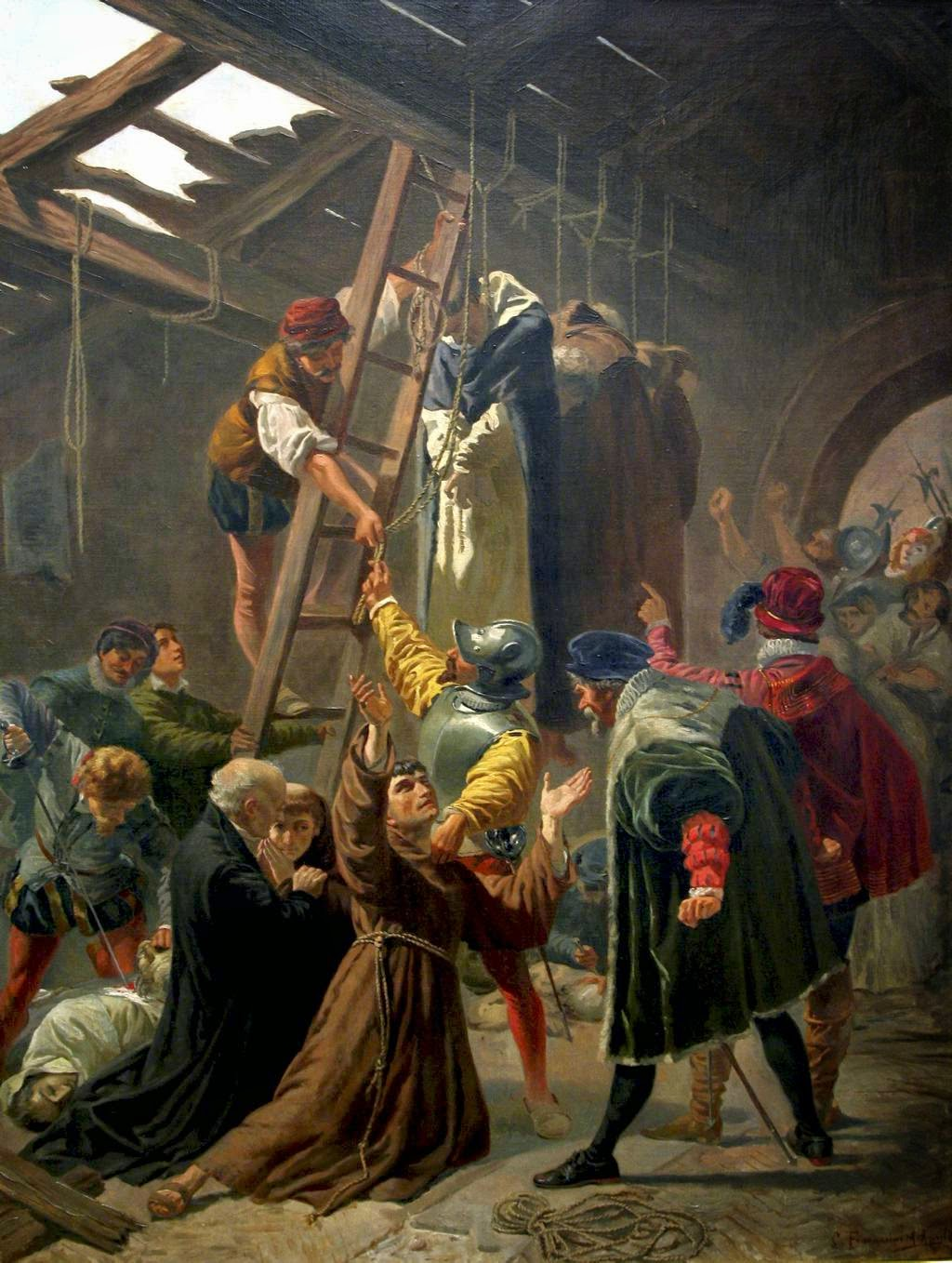
Martyrs de Gorkum

=== Public service ===
- John V, Lord of Arkel (1362–1428) stadtholder of Holland, Zeeland and West Frisia
- Henry of Gorkum (c. 1378– 1431) a Dutch theologian
- Willem Hessels van Est (1542–1613) a Dutch Catholic theologian
- The Martyrs of Gorkum a group of 19 Dutch Catholic clerics who were hanged in 1572
- Thomas van Erpe (1584–1624) a Dutch Orientalist, published a book of Arabic grammar
- Dirk Rafelsz Camphuysen (1586–1627) theologian, poet, painter
- Johannes van Neercassel (1625–1686) Archbishop of Utrecht 1661 to 1686.
- Hendrik Hamel (1630–1692) seafarer and writer
- Aegidius van Braam (1758–1822) a Dutch naval vice-admiral
- Pierre van Paassen (1895–1968) a Dutch–Canadian-American journalist, writer, and Unitarian minister
- Roger van Boxtel (born 1954) a retired Dutch politician and businessman, lives in Gorinchem

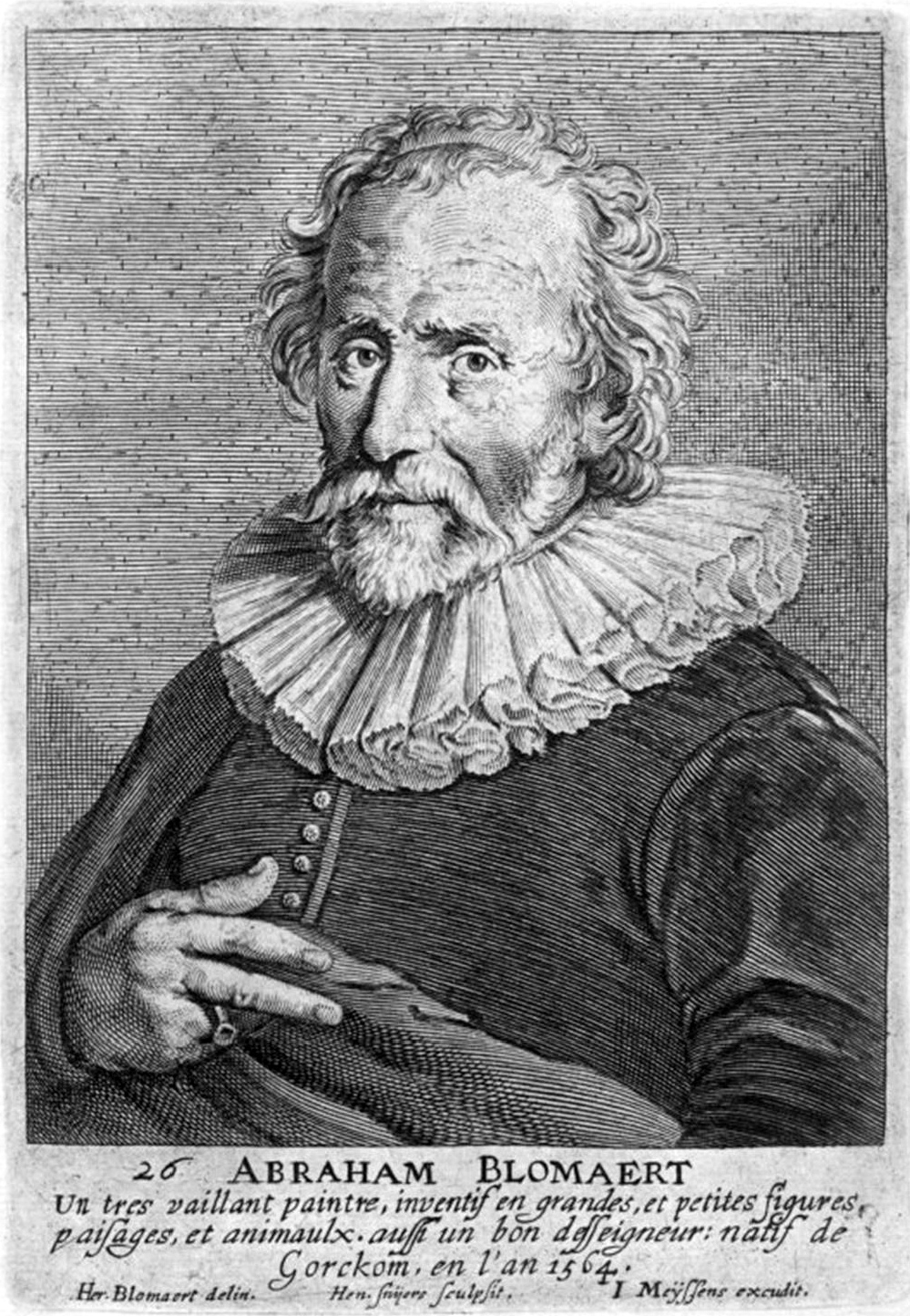
Abraham Bloemaert

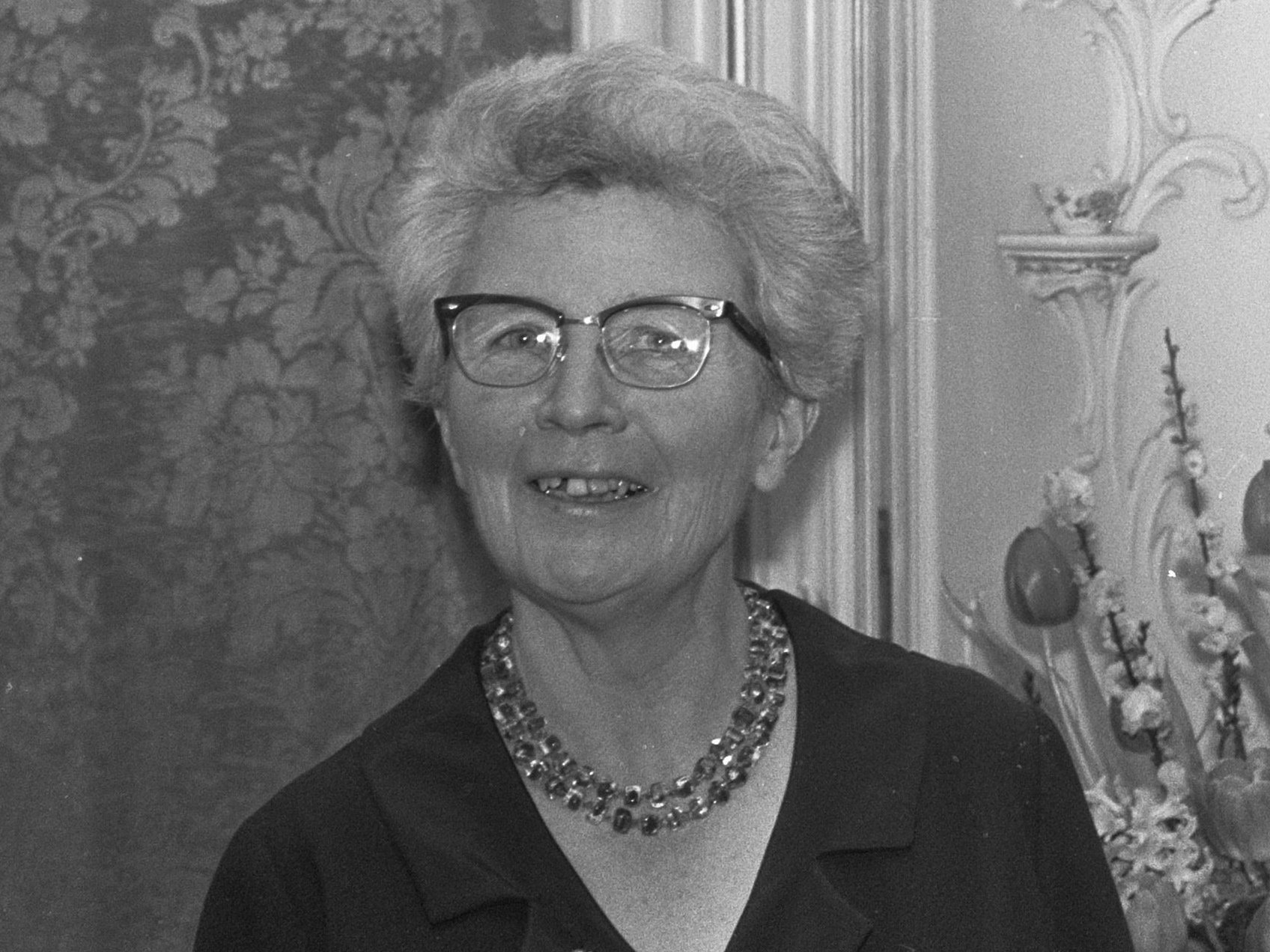
Ida Gerhardt, 1968

=== The arts ===
- Abraham Bloemaert (1566–1651) Dutch painter and printmaker in etching and engraving
- Anthonie Verstraelen (1593/1594–1641) a Dutch landscape painter of winter scenes
- Aert van der Neer (c. 1603–1677) a Dutch Golden Age landscape painter
- Cornelis Saftleven (ca.1607–1681) a Dutch painter, worked in many genres
- Jacob van der Ulft (1621–1689) a Dutch painter, glass painter, print artist, architect and Mayor of Gorinchem 1660 to 1679
- Hendrik Verschuring (1627–1690) a Dutch Golden Age landscape painter
- Jan van der Heyden (1637–1712) a Dutch Baroque-era painter, glass painter, draughtsman and printmaker
- Ida Gerhardt (1905–1997) a classicist and Dutch poet of a post-symbolist tradition
- A. Teeuw (1921–2012) a Dutch critic of Indonesian literature
- Jan van Munster (1939–2024) a Dutch sculptor and installation artist
- Dinand Woesthoff (born 1972) a Dutch musician, lead singer with Dutch band Kane
- Nikos Vertis (born 1976) a Greek singer
- Boaz de Jong (born 1988) stage name Boaz van de Beatz, a Dutch record producer and DJ
- Chu Lan-ting (born 1990) stage name Diana Wang, a Dutch-born Taiwanese singer and film actress

=== Science & business ===
- Gerard Boate (1604–1650) physician and author of The Natural History of Ireland and his brother
- Arnold Boate (1606–1653) a Dutch physician and Hebrew scholar
- Louis Jérôme Reiche (1799–1890) a French merchant, manufacturer and entomologist
- Berend George Escher (1885–1967) a Dutch geologist and vulcanologist
- Frans Michel Penning (1894–1953) a Dutch experimental physicist

=== Sport ===
- Ab Oord (1885–1961) a Dutch weightlifter, competed at the 1924 Summer Olympics
- Hadriaan van Nes (born 1942) a retired rower, team silver medallist at the 1968 Summer Olympics
- Ruud Brood (born 1962) a football manager and former player with over 300 club caps
- Arie Loef (born 1969) a retired speed skater, competed at the 1992 and 1994 Winter Olympics
- Marco van Hoogdalem (born 1972) a retired Dutch football player with over 350 club caps
- Henk Norel (born 1987) a Dutch basketball player, 79 games with the Netherlands national basketball team
- Frenkie de Jong (born 1997) a Dutch football player who is currently playing for FC Barcelona.

== International relations ==
Gorinchem is twinned with

Gangjin, South Korea	Sint Niklaas, Belgium

== Gallery ==
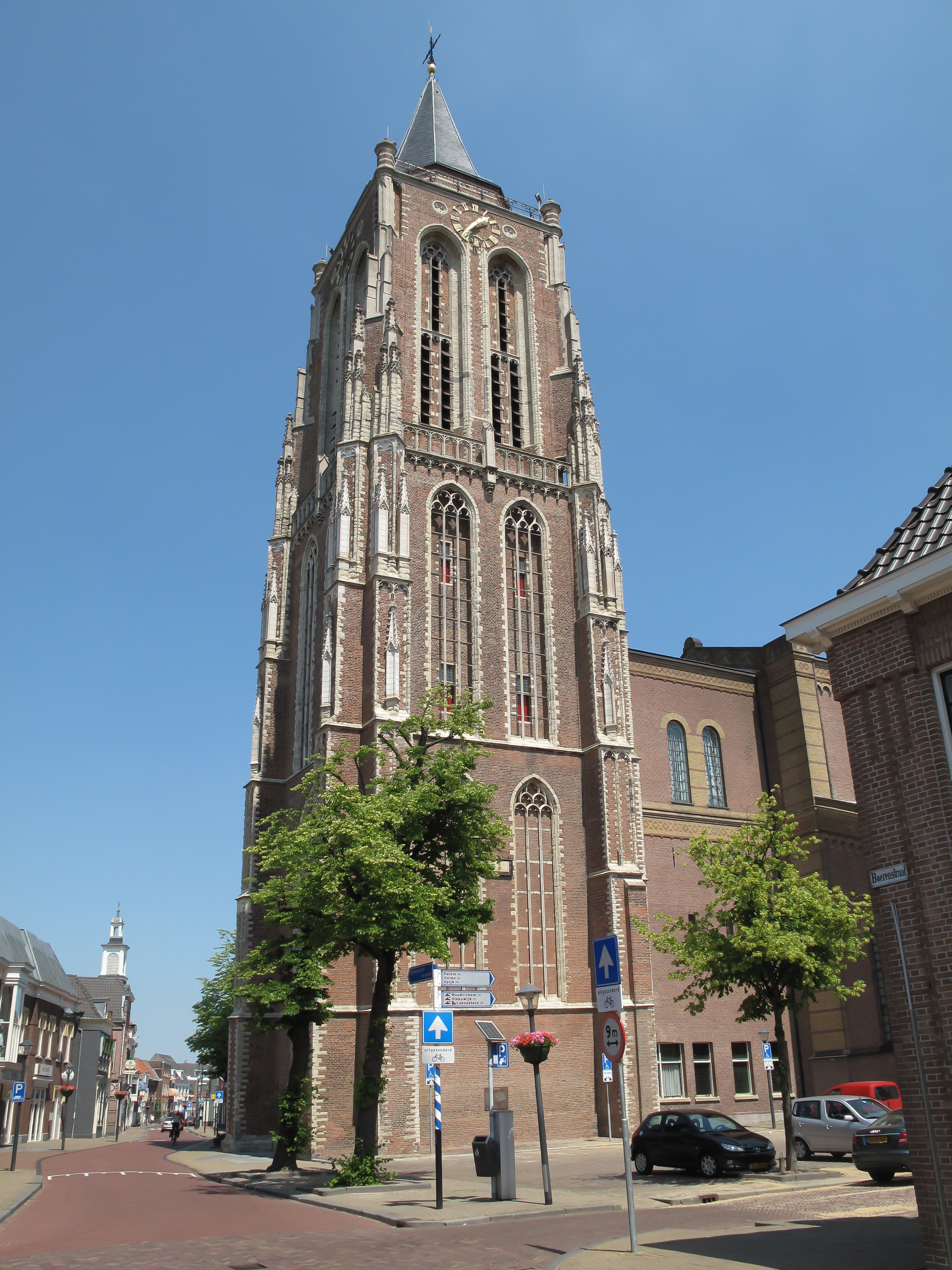
Gorinchem, church: de Grote Kerk

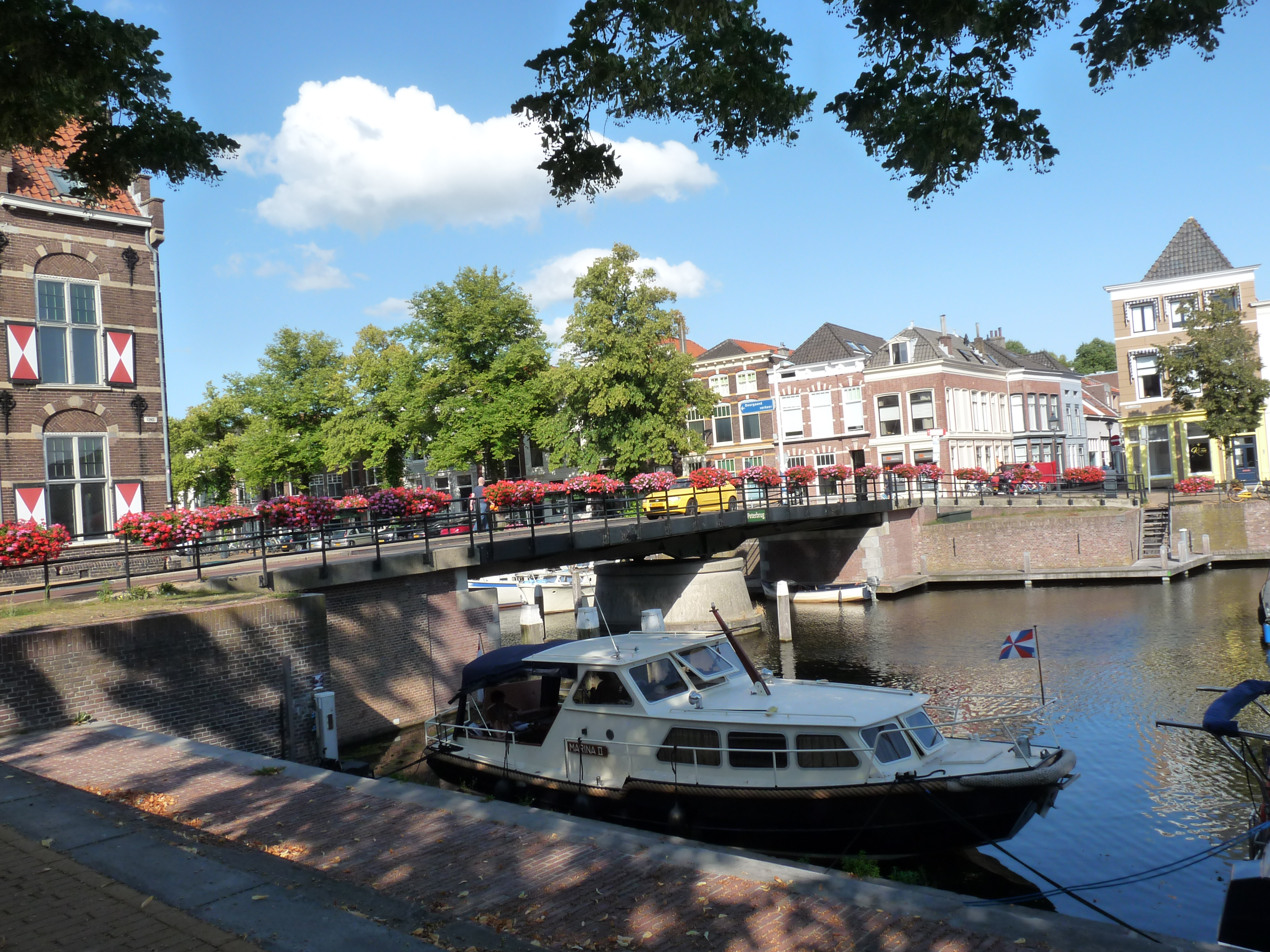
Gorinchem

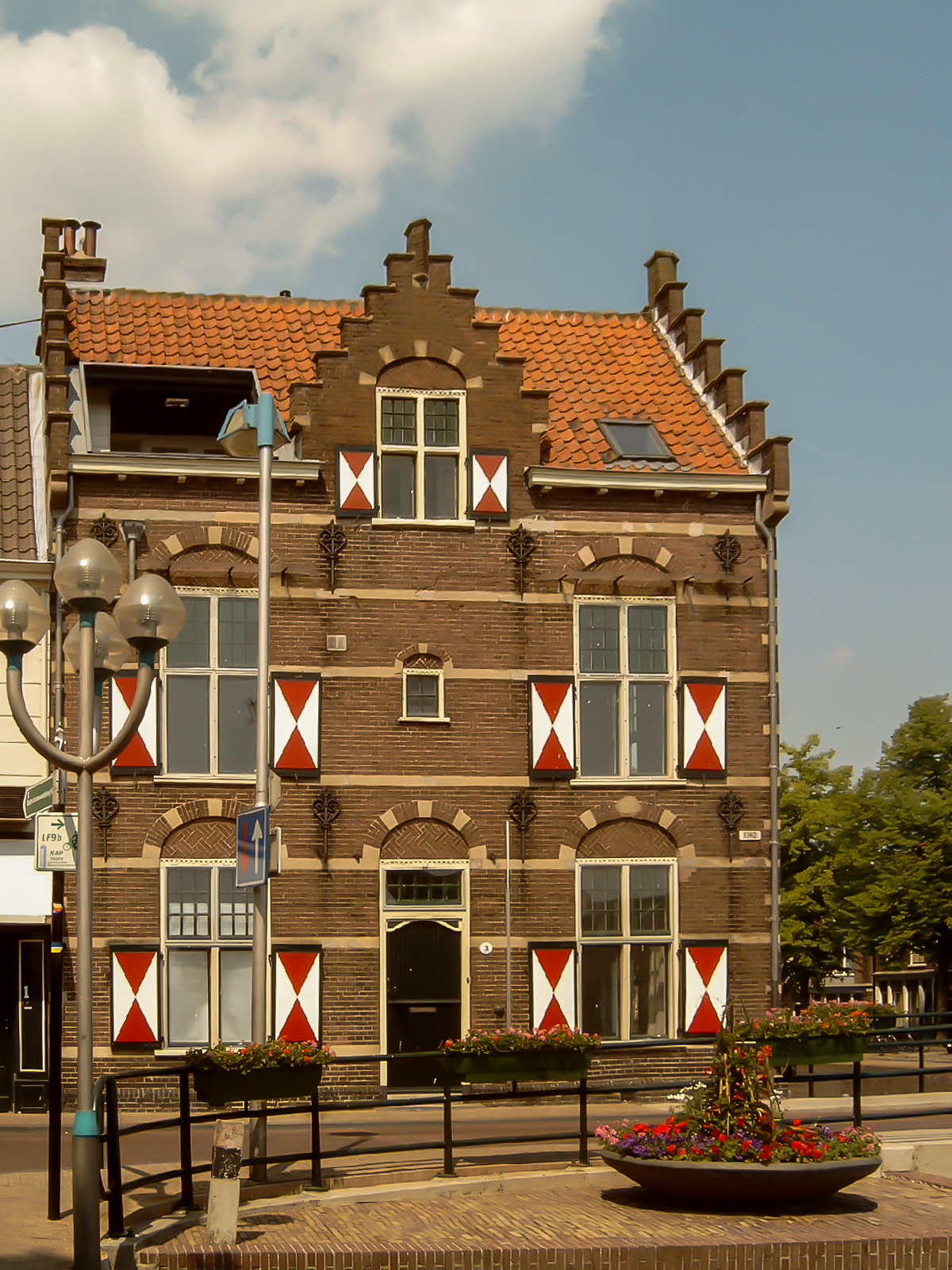
Gorinchem, historic building

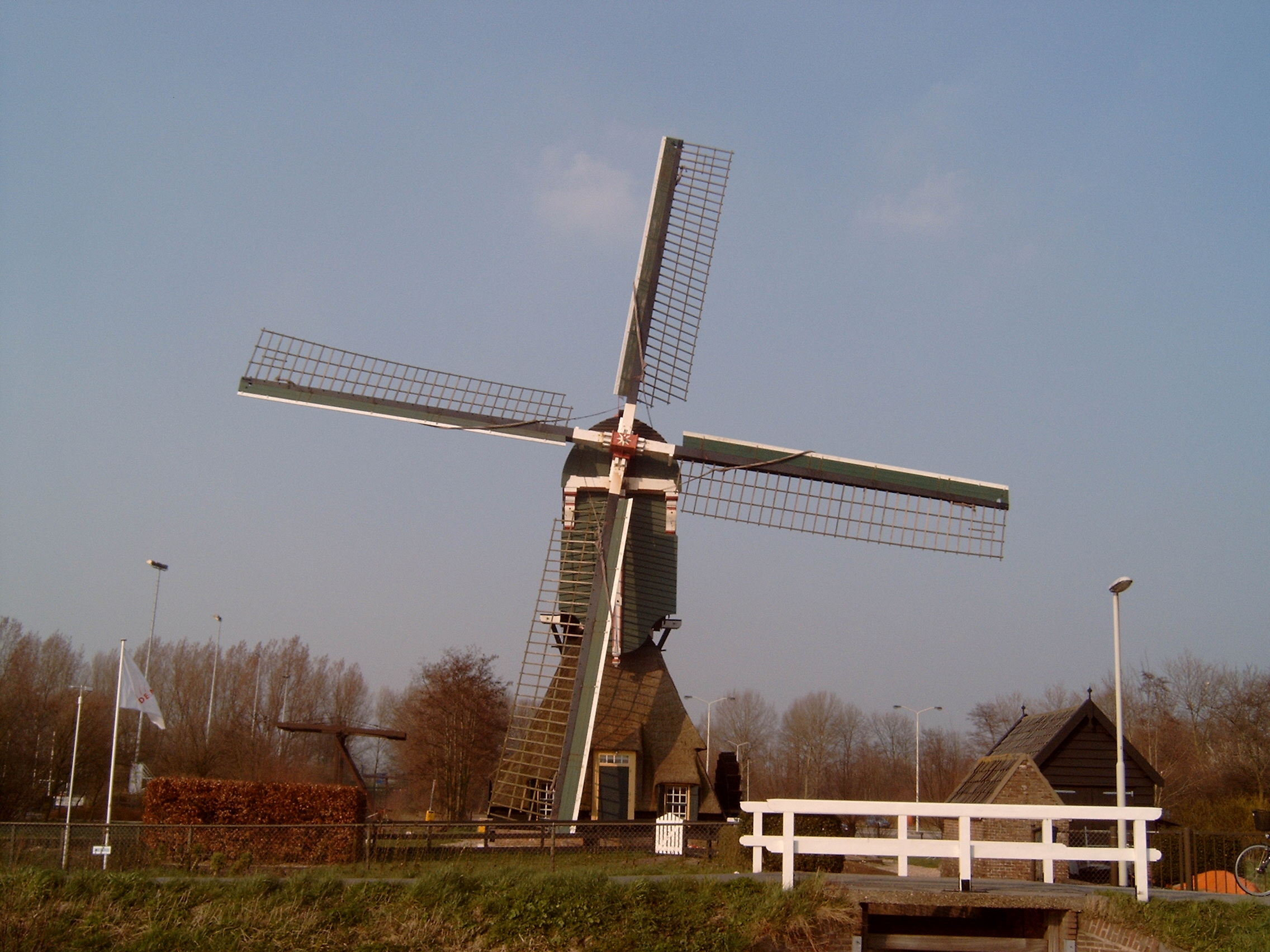
Gorinchem, windmill

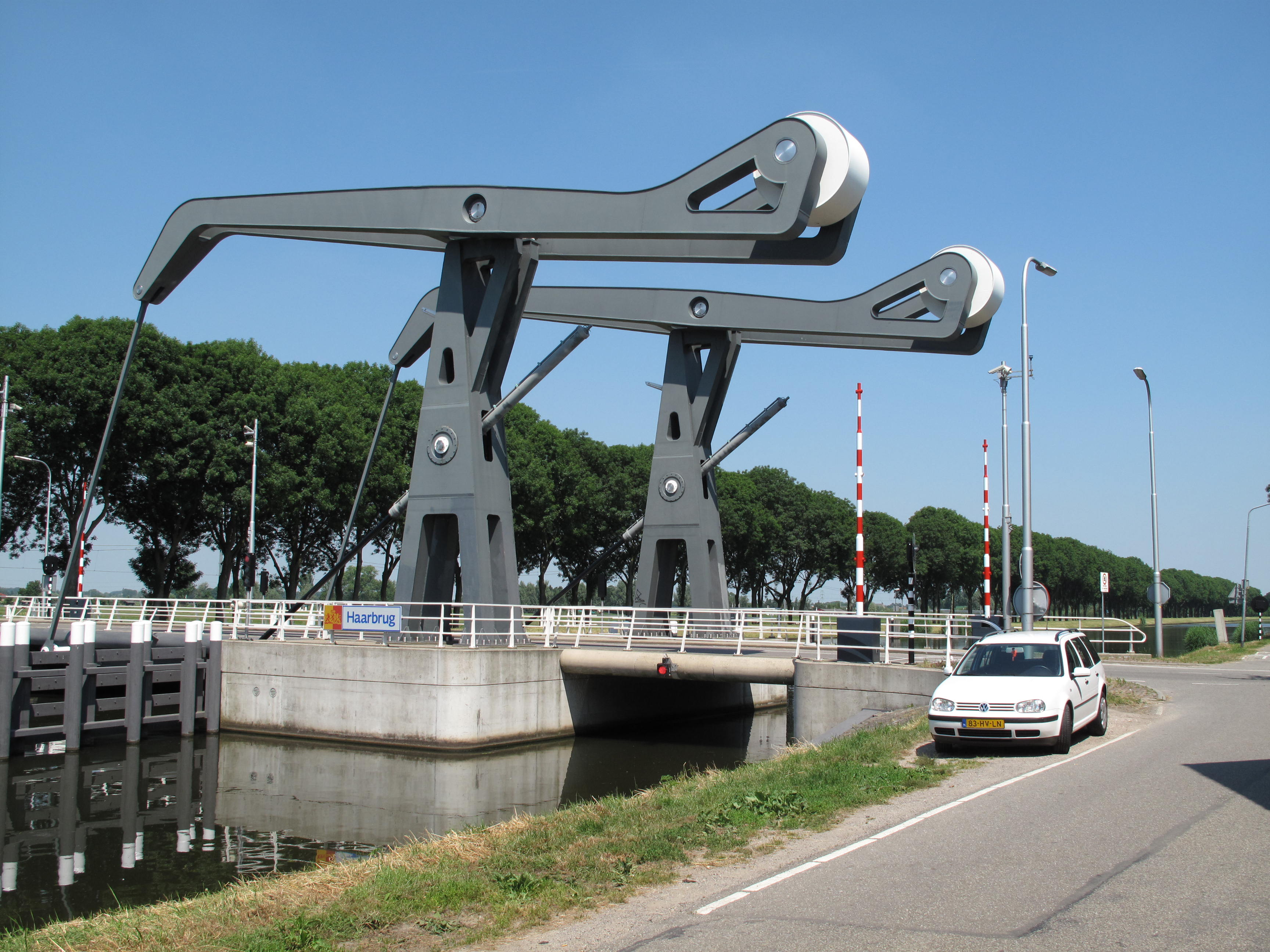
between Gorinchem and Arkel, bridge: de Haarbrug
