= Staatsbosbeheer =

Dutch government organization

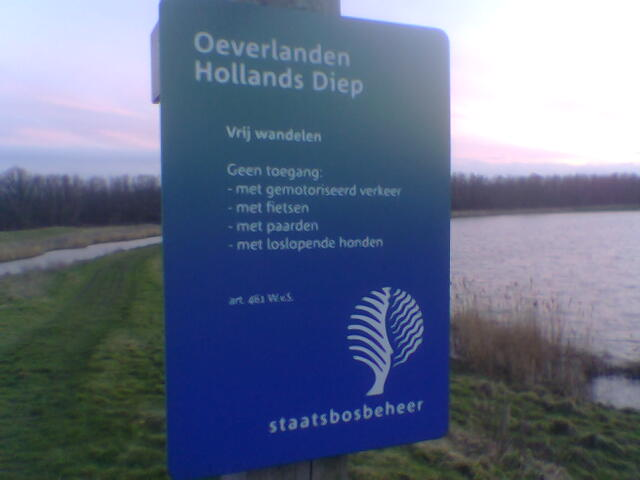
The logo of Staatsbosbeheer on an entrance sign of Oeverlanden Hollands Diep

Staatsbosbeheer, founded in 1899, is a Dutch government organization for forestry and the management of nature reserves.

Staatsbosbeheer currently oversees over 250,000 hectares of land in the Netherlands. Usually this land is open to the public for recreational purposes, but restrictions often apply. Examples are the compulsory use of a leash when bringing a dog, or daytime access only.

The organization has been criticized for not taking sufficient care of its lands, and for interfering with political decisions, but news reports are generally positive or simply report public service announcements from the organization.

While the literal translation of the name would be 'State Forest Management', forests make up only 900 square kilometres of the total land under its supervision. The remaining land consists of various landscapes, such as dunes, polders and wetlands.

== Chairpersons ==
Chairperson		Period
Hans Wiegel	Hans Wiegel (born 1941)	1 January 1998 – 1 January 2008 (10 years, 0 days)
Elco Brinkman	Elco Brinkman (born 1948)	1 January 2008 – 1 April 2010 (2 years, 90 days)
	Inge Brakman (born 1961)	1 April 2010 – 1 January 2018 (7 years, 275 days)
	Charlotte Insinger (born 1965)	1 January 2018 – present (8 years, 207 days)

== Notable areas under supervision by Staatsbosbeheer ==
- Bargerveen
- Berkheide
- De Biesbosch
- Donkse Laagten
- Oostvaardersplassen
- Strubben-Kniphorstbos
- Utrechtse Heuvelrug National Park
- Wierickerschans
